= Desperate Housewives season 7 =

Desperate Housewives
- Season 7
- ABC promotional poster for the seventh season of Desperate Housewives. From left to right: Lynette, Susan, Renee, Gabrielle, and Bree.
- Starring: Teri Hatcher; Felicity Huffman; Marcia Cross; Eva Longoria; Vanessa Williams; Ricardo Antonio Chavira; Doug Savant; Mark Moses; Kathryn Joosten; Kevin Rahm; Tuc Watkins; Brenda Strong; James Denton
- No. of episodes: 23

Release
- Original network: ABC
- Original release: September 26, 2010 – May 15, 2011

Season chronology
- ← Previous; Season 6 Next → Season 8

The seventh season of Desperate Housewives, a television series created by Marc Cherry, began airing on September 26, 2010, and concluded on May 15, 2011. The deceased Mary Alice Young continues to narrate the events in the lives of her friends and Wisteria Lane residents, Susan Delfino, Lynette Scavo, Bree Van de Kamp and Gabrielle Solis. New housewife Renee Perry is introduced in this season. Paul Young returns to the lane and is the center of this season's mystery.

According to Cherry, he had intended for the series to conclude after its seventh season, but the eighth season ended up being the series' final season. The first episode of the season aired in Latin America on October 6, 2010. Season 7 premiered in Ireland on Tuesday, October 12, 2010. Season 7 began airing in the United Kingdom on October 17, 2010. It started airing at 9:00 pm on October 25, 2010, on OSN's Show Series in the Middle East. Season 7 began airing in France in the translated version on April 14, 2011, on Canal Plus.

The series saw the lowest ratings in its history in the seventh season. In the first 12 episodes, the series attracted very similar viewership to the second half of the sixth season and hit season highs of 4.4 in the 18-49 demographic and continued around 3.5 - 4.3 until mid January. But after the thirteenth episode of season seven, "I'm Still Here", the ratings declined heavily because of the consecutive competition from the 68th Golden Globe Awards and then saw even lower numbers, against the 2011 Grammy Awards and then the Country Music Association Awards. "Desperate Housewives" lost many viewers in the second half of its season, and unlike the previous season, it failed to pick up again towards the end of the season. The show hit series lows of 2.7 in 18-49 demographic twice and continued to receive ratings between 2.7 - 3.1 in the last 11 episodes with the exception of "Searching" which was promoted by ABC after the 83rd Academy Awards and had a lead in from the season premiere of Secret Millionaire. This is the first time in its history that it did not place in the 20 most watched shows, ranking as the 26th most watched show, although it did place as the 13th most watched scripted show during the 2010-11 television season. The season averaged 11.85 million viewers per episode and is ABC's third most watched scripted show in total viewers after Body of Proof and Modern Family. In the 18-49 demographic, the show ranked 20th.

== Cast ==
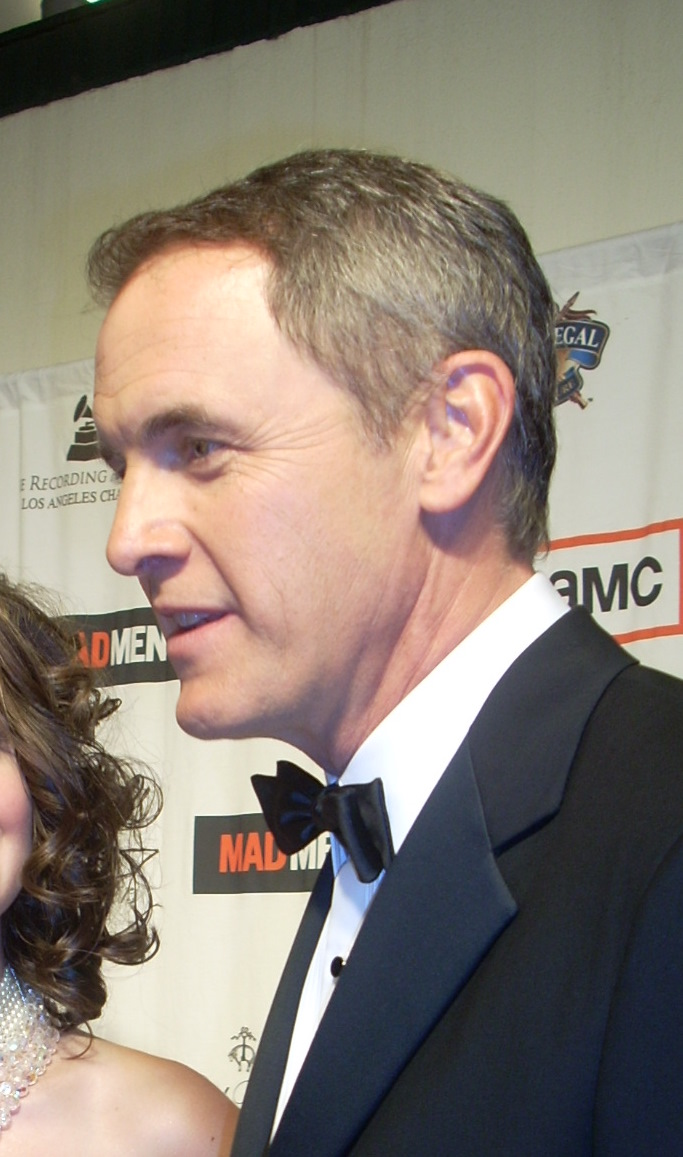
Moses's character returned as the subject of the season's main mystery.

The seventh season had thirteen roles receiving star billing, with eight out of twelve returning from the previous season. The series is narrated by Brenda Strong, who portrays the deceased Mary Alice Young, as she observes from beyond the grave the lives of the Wisteria Lane residents and her former best friends. Teri Hatcher portrayed Susan Delfino, who has moved out of the lane following a financial crisis. Felicity Huffman portrayed Lynette Scavo, who endures extreme marital problems. Marcia Cross portrayed Bree Van de Kamp, now divorced and starting a relationship with her contractor. Eva Longoria portrayed Gabrielle Solis, who discovers that her eldest daughter was switched at birth. Ricardo Antonio Chavira portrayed Carlos Solis, Gabrielle's husband who is close to discover the truth about his mother's death. Doug Savant portrayed Tom Scavo, Lynette's husband who is keeping a secret from her. James Denton portrayed Mike Delfino, Susan's husband who decides to take a job in Alaska in order to earn more money. Former Ugly Betty star Vanessa Williams joined the cast as a sort of fifth lead (following the departure of three supporting housewives over the previous two seasons) in the role of Renee Perry, Lynette's best friend from college. Several years after leaving the contractually bound cast following the second season, Mark Moses returned in the role of Paul Young, Mary Alice's widower whose mysterious arc is the season's main storyline. Kathryn Joosten was promoted from "also starring" to a formal "starring" cast member in the role of elderly neighbor Karen McCluskey. Former recurring guest stars Kevin Rahm and Tuc Watkins were also promoted to "starring" cast members respectively playing Lee McDermott and Bob Hunter, a gay couple. Kyle MacLachlan asked to be let go from the main cast after the sixth season to pursue other projects, but he made two guest appearances during this season as Orson Hodge, Bree's ex-husband.

Also starring were Charlie Carver as Porter Scavo and Joshua Logan Moore as Parker Scavo, Lynette's sons, as well as child actors Madison De La Garza as Juanita Solis, Gabrielle's oldest daughter, and Mason Vale Cotton as M.J. Delfino, Susan's son. The role of Penny Scavo was recast, with Kendall Applegate being replaced by Darcy Rose Byrnes. Andrea Bowen left the "also starring" cast, but returned as a guest star during one episode as Julie Mayer, Susan's daughter.

This season featured many established and new guest stars. Part of Susan's storyline were Lainie Kazan portraying Maxine Rosen, Susan's landlady who also hires her to model on her erotic website, Lesley Ann Warren returning as Sophie Bremmer, Susan's mother who is now fighting cancer, Gregory Itzin featuring as Dick Barrows, a dialysis patient encountered by Susan, Aaron Lustig acting as Craig Lynwood, Fairview Memorial Hospital's transplant coordinator, and John Rubinstein in the role of Principal Hobson, headmaster at M.J.'s school and Susan's former boss. Part of Lynette's storyline were Max Carver playing Preston Scavo, another of Lynette's sons, Lois Smith portraying Allison Scavo, Tom's mother, Polly Bergen returning as Stella Wingfield, Lynette's troublesome mother, Larry Hagman appearing as Frank Kaminsky, Stella's new husband, and Brent and Shane Kinsman reprising their roles as the younger versions of Preston and Porter in flashbacks. Part of Bree's storyline were Shawn Pyfrom and Joy Lauren in the roles of Bree's son and daughter, Andrew and Danielle Van de Kamp, Brian Austin Green appearing as Keith Watson, Bree's contractor and lover for the first part of the season, John Schneider and Nancy Travis respectively playing Richard Watson and Mary Wagner, Keith's parents, Rochelle Aytes appearing as Amber James, the mother of Keith's son, Dakin Matthews playing Reverend Sykes, reverend at the local Presbyterian church, and future series regular Jonathan Cake in the role of Chuck Vance, a detective and Bree's lover towards the end of the season. Part of Gabrielle's storyline were Daniella Baltodano portraying Celia Solis, Gabrielle's youngest daughter, Rolando Molina and Carla Jimenez respectively playing Hector and Carmen Sanchez, Juanita's biological parents and the legal parents of Carlos and Gabrielle's biological daughter Grace, Stephanie Faracy in the role of Miss Charlotte, a doll store owner, and Tony Plana appearing towards the end of the season as Alejandro Perez, Gabrielle's perverted stepfather. Part of the main mystery arc were Harriet Sansom Harris returning as Felicia Tilman, who still seeks revenge on Paul after he killed her sister, Emily Bergl portraying Beth Young, Paul's new wife, former series regular Cody Kasch in the role of Zach Young, Mary Alice and Paul's son, and Steven Culp and Christine Estabrook reprising their roles as Rex Van de Kamp (Bree's deceased first husband) and Martha Huber (Felicia's sister who was killed by Paul) in the season premiere in a series of flashbacks that explained the events that led to the development of main mystery of the season. Orson Bean played Roy Bender, now married to Mrs. McCluskey, while Mindy Sterling appeared as Mitzi Kinsky, another resident of Wisteria Lane.

== Episodes ==
No. overall	No. in season	Title	Directed by	Written by	Original release date	Prod. code	U.S. viewers (millions)
135	1	"Remember Paul?"	David Grossman	Marc Cherry	September 26, 2010	701	13.06
Paul Young is released after Felicia's deception is discovered by the police. News of Paul's return jolts the neighborhood, including Susan, who did not know that she had rented her home to him. Susan and her family struggle to adapt to their changed life, and Susan secretly accepts a job from her landlord, Maxine, to appear on her private home-run erotic website. After losing Orson and her business, Bree begins to rebuild her life by taking interest in her contractor, Keith. Lynette's old college frenemy Renee comes to visit her, but their friendly bickering escalates into an argument. A lawyer for Fairview Memorial Hospital tells Carlos that Juanita is not their biological child and was accidentally switched at birth; Carlos decides to keep the information from Gabrielle to spare her the pain. Gabrielle decides not to tell Carlos about Bree's confession, because she does not want to upset him.
136	2	"You Must Meet My Wife"	Larry Shaw	Dave Flebotte	October 3, 2010	702	13.23
Bree begins to think about Keith sexually, and accidentally runs into Juanita while watching Keith as she backs out of her driveway. While Juanita recovers in the hospital, Gabrielle discovers that Juanita's blood type is inconsistent with hers and Carlos, forcing Carlos to reveal that Juanita was accidentally switched at birth. Susan begins her new online job cleaning her house in raunchy lingerie for paying customers, keeping it a secret from Mike. The ladies meet Paul's new wife, Beth Young, who married Paul while he was still incarcerated. However, Beth appears unsure of being with Paul now that he is free. Lynette is dismayed when Renee begins spending time with Tom, who has been diagnosed with postpartum depression. Upon discovering that Renee has bought Edie's former house, Tom warns Renee that Lynette may find out about "something that happened" between them years earlier.
137	3	"Truly Content"	Tara Nicole Weyr	Matt Berry	October 10, 2010	703	12.38
Lynette is stunned when Tom's doctor prescribes marijuana as a cure for his depression, and she switches the marijuana with oregano; Tom does not feel the difference and begins to think that he is high. Gabrielle convinces Bob to hire a private detective to find her real biological daughter, but keeps it a secret from Carlos. After discovering that Bob has talked to the family that has their biological daughter, Carlos threatens Gabrielle with a divorce if something happens. Susan clashes with another model in the same building who accuses Susan of stealing one of her "moves". Renee takes Bree to a night out in a club, but competition begins between the two of them when Renee begins to flirt with Keith. The women invite Beth to their weekly poker game in an attempt to find out secrets about Paul. After discovering that Paul was a suspect in the murder of Martha Huber, Beth confronts Paul, who denies it.
138	4	"The Thing That Counts Is What's Inside"	David Grossman	Jason Ganzel	October 17, 2010	704	12.67
Carlos and Gabrielle meet Hector and Carmen, the parents who raised their biological daughter Grace. Gabrielle offers to give Grace a Chanel purse, but Carmen does not accept it, stating that Grace is not spoiled; Gabrielle later secretly gives Grace a necklace. Lynette convinces Tom to hire a nanny so she can spend more time with her kids. After another argument, Renee lets go of Keith and tells Bree that she can have him. Paul buys his old house on Wisteria Lane and tries to convince Karen to sell her house. Maxine tells Susan that she has sold her business and reveals that the new investors' plan for expansion includes heavy marketing across the country. Susan is horrified to discover an advertising billboard with a screen-capture of her on it, and she manages to rip down the segment with her face; a mysterious man is later seen taking the ripped billboard out of the trash.
139	5	"Let Me Entertain You"	Lonny Price	Sara Parriott & Josann McGibbon	October 24, 2010	705	12.16
Susan is fired by Maxine after cancelling a session with a big client, and she has paid $9,000 to the advertising company to take down the advertisements with her face. After being confronted by Mike, Susan claims that she lent the money to Lynette, forcing Susan to confess her secret to Lynette. It is revealed that Paul was the person who salvaged Susan's advertisement, and he blackmails Susan into selling her house. Bree is exhausted with Keith's unrestricted libido, but he later confesses that he was trying to impress her. Lynette is angered after Tom hires his mother Allison as the baby's nanny without talking to her first. Renee tells Gabrielle that she renegotiated the terms of her divorce by sleeping with her ex-husband Doug's divorce lawyer. When Renee tells Bree and Lynette about Gabrielle's nose job, Gabrielle tells Doug, who arrived in Fairview to reconcile with his wife, Renee's secret.
140	6	"Excited and Scared"	Jeff Greenstein	Jeff Greenstein	October 31, 2010	706	11.10
Susan is forced to reveal her secret to Mike, who takes up an oil rig job in Alaska. Realizing he has no leverage, Paul gets Susan fired from her job by informing one of the mothers from Oakridge about Susan's website. Susan tries to attack Paul, but Beth pulls a gun on Susan to get her off the property. Juanita becomes suspicious of Gaby spending a lot of time and attention towards Grace, which culminates in Juanita cutting part of Grace's hair. Noticing Juanita’s jealousy, Carlos tells Gabrielle that they should stay away from Grace's family. Lynette is worried about Allison's memory lapses and voices her concerns to Tom, who reluctantly decides to send Allison to an assisted living home. Bree visits Keith's apartment for the first time and discovers an envelope from the department of corrections. Bree later seeks advice from Renee, who reveals that Keith is on probation for assault.
141	7	"A Humiliating Business"	Larry Shaw	Marco Pennette	November 7, 2010	707	12.72
Mike has left town after taking the job in Alaska, and a reluctant Susan accepts Lynette's offer to be Paige's nanny while Lynette and Renee start a business in interior design. After undergoing menopause, Bree is pressured to tell Keith the truth. While meeting Keith's parents, Mary and Richard, Bree admits to being menopausal and leaves; Keith later suggests adoption, but Bree tells him that she does not want to have children again. Gabrielle fears that Bob might be trying to seduce Carlos after they become friends. Bob reveals that he is lonely and befriended Carlos for companionship, resulting in Gabrielle reuniting Bob with Lee. Beth and Paul have sex for the first time, but Beth begins to question Paul's motives for returning to Wisteria Lane after discovering that he is letting his old cellmate move into his old house. Beth later calls her mother, who is revealed to be the imprisoned Felicia Tillman.
142	8	"Sorry Grateful"	David Grossman	Annie Weisman	November 14, 2010	708	11.92
Felicia instructs Beth to learn more about Paul's past misdeeds, but is angered to learn that Beth is genuinely falling in love with Paul. Bree invites Keith's parents to a Thanksgiving dinner, during which Mary requests for a divorce, discouraging Keith from proposing to Bree. Later, Bree is stunned when Richard begins to flirt with her. Susan fights with Lynette about her techniques to make Paige fall asleep; Lynette wants Paige to self-soothe herself, but Susan insists on rocking Paige to sleep. Renee reminds Tom about their past and flirts with him. Carlos and Gabrielle throw a Thanksgiving dinner with Grace's family. After Hector is arrested during an altercation with the police, Gabrielle and Carlos discover that Hector and Carmen are undocumented Mexican immigrants. When Carmen reveals that Grace is an American citizen by birth, Gabrielle insinuates that Grace might be able to stay with the Solises.
143	9	"Pleasant Little Kingdom"	Arlene Sanford	Dave Flebotte	December 5, 2010	709	11.36
Keith prepares to propose to Bree with a special dinner, but the date goes wrong when Bree invites Richard to join them. Later, Bree visits Keith's apartment but finds Richard, who implies that Bree should be with him instead. To ensure that they can get Grace to live with them, Gabrielle informs ICE about Carmen's whereabouts. Experiencing second thoughts, Gabrielle poses as Carmen when ICE arrives, allowing Carmen to get away. Forced to flee to Texas, Carmen and Grace have an emotional farewell with Gabrielle and Carlos. Susan takes Renee out for dinner, after which Renee drunkenly reveals that the love of her life is Tom. After acquiring numerous properties on the lane, Paul unveils his plan to build a halfway house for released convicts on Wisteria Lane. To secure a majority vote with the homeowners' association, Paul attempts to pit his neighbors against one another by offering financial incentives to sell their homes.
144	10	"Down the Block There's a Riot"	Larry Shaw	Bob Daily	December 12, 2010	710	11.60
Paul officially opens the halfway house after tricking Lee into selling his home, leading Lynette to start a protest among the neighborhood. As Gabrielle tries to cope with losing Grace, Lynette suggests that Gabrielle write a letter to Grace that would never be sent; Juanita discovers the letter and learns the truth about the baby switch. Upset, Juanita crawls into Bob and Lee's car. Keith proposes to Bree, who states that she is not ready to get married, but they compromise on Keith moving in. Keith punches Richard after discovering that he is flirting with Bree; the protestors start attacking Keith, assuming he is an ex-con. In an attempt to break up the fight, Bree fires a gunshot in the air, causing a riot among the protestors; Susan is violently trampled by the crowd and falls unconscious, while Gabrielle saves Juanita as the rioters smash Bob and Lee's car. The next morning, Paul gets shot by an unknown gunman.
145	11	"Assassins"	David Warren	John Paul Bullock III	January 2, 2011	711	12.19
Following the riot, Susan is advised to go on dialysis by her doctors, who were forced to remove a kidney due to her extensive injuries. After collapsing and having a seizure in front of M.J., Susan asks Lynette, Bree and Gabrielle to support Mike and M.J. if something bad happens to her. As Juanita tries to cope with her being switched at birth, Carlos and Gabrielle speak with a therapist, who advises them to erase Grace from their lives. Gabrielle is reluctant to do so and ends up buying a doll for herself that resembles Grace. Renee confesses her past liaison with Tom to Lynette. Orson, having left his girlfriend, returns to Wisteria Lane. Orson confesses that he is still in love with Bree, but she rebuffs him, proclaiming her love for Keith. While being questioned by detectives in the hospital, Paul is stunned to learn that Beth is Felicia's daughter but covers it up, claiming that he and Felicia have reconciled.
146	12	"Where Do I Belong"	David Grossman	David Schladweiler	January 9, 2011	712	12.83
Lynette plays revenge pranks on Tom for sleeping with Renee twenty years ago, but Tom defends himself, stating that they had briefly split up during that time. Gabrielle is horrified when Juanita and Celia break her doll, and she takes it to the doll shop owner, Miss Charlotte, to get it fixed; the two have an intimate conversation about Gabrielle's emotional attachment to the doll. At the hospital, Susan receives a visit from Sophie and her aunt Claire. Susan discovers from Claire that Sophie has been diagnosed with cancer, but did not want to burden Susan with this information. After being asked by her pastor, Bree hesitantly befriends Beth and organizes a get-together with the other housewives. When Beth discovers a gun hidden under the cushion, Beth accuses the housewives of attempting to frame her for shooting Paul. Bree receives flowers from an anonymous person, who is later revealed to be from Zach Young.
147	13	"I'm Still Here"	Lonny Price	Josann McGibbon & Sara Parriott	January 16, 2011	713	10.25
Bree finds out that Keith has a son he didn't know about through an ex-girlfriend, Amber, and offers to tell him. Stella announces that she is marrying her racist boyfriend Frank for his money; Lynette disapproves until Stella confesses that marrying Frank is easier than admitting her own loneliness. Susan receives dialysis treatment at the same time with Dick, another patient, and tries to empathize with him. After discovering that Renee regrets not having children, Bob and Lee take their newly adopted daughter Jenny to meet Renee. While driving in a dangerous neighborhood, Carlos and Gabrielle are mugged and carjacked with her doll still in the car, leaving Gabrielle hysterical. Believing that Beth was the one who shot him, Paul suggests they go on a trip, intending to kill her. However, when police come to their door with evidence, Paul cancels the trip and suspects that Zach may have been the one who shot him.
148	14	"Flashback"	Andrew Doerfer	Matt Berry	February 13, 2011	714	9.20
Paul discovers that Zach has been taking drugs and gambling, and it is revealed that Zach shot Paul. Mike encourages Paul to take Zach to rehab, pointing out that Zach is their son and needs help. Susan learns that a former classmate, Monroe, is willing to donate a kidney to her, but his actions become increasingly creepy and obsessive. When Susan rebuffs his advances, Monroe decides not to go through with the kidney donation. Lynette agrees to do a family photo with Frank and Stella, but Frank dies during the shoot; Stella convinces Lynette to delay reporting his death to keep his will intact. Bree gives Amber money for bills and gives a picture of Charlie to Keith, informing him that Charlie is his son. Gabrielle goes to therapy but struggles to talk about her childhood. When Carlos convinces her to open up, Gabrielle explains that her need to protect Grace stems from her stepfather molesting her as a child.
149	15	"Farewell Letter"	David Grossman	Marco Pennette	February 20, 2011	715	10.58
Lynette forces Porter and Preston to move out, but they end up renting a room in Karen's house while continuing to rely on Lynette. However, Karen returns Porter and Preston to the Scavo house when they trash her house with a party. Susan struggles with the costs of her dialysis treatment and uses her dialysis as an excuse when a police officer pulls her over. While going out for dinner with Renee, Susan suddenly collapses while waiting for a table. Gabrielle returns to her hometown and is treated like a celebrity, but confronts a nun who didn't believe her when she confided in her about her stepfather's abuse. Bree encourages Keith to move to Florida to be close to his son and breaks up with him, admitting that their age difference is too much for a long-term relationship. Mike and Paul take Zach to rehab. Paul confronts Beth about her relation to Felicia and kicks her out, despite Beth admitting that she has fallen in love with him.
150	16	"Searching"	Larry Shaw	Jeff Greenstein	March 6, 2011	716	11.35
Gabrielle clashes with Lee when she questions his parenting skills, leading Lee to suggest that Jenny and Juanita compete against each in the talent show. After discovering that Renee is considering trying for a baby, Lynette challenges Renee to babysit Paige for the night; Renee ultimately goes on a date and pays a waitress to babysit Paige. Beth tries to get back together with Paul, who coldly confirms that he killed Martha. Beth then visits Felicia, but is cruelly lambasted by her mother for having no proof of confession. Susan and Mike are informed that she will die if she does not receive a kidney transplant immediately. Both Beth and Bree are revealed to be a match with Susan, but Bree insists on being Susan's donor because of their close friendship. Lonely and depressed, Beth arrives at the emergency room with kidney donation paperwork for Susan and commits suicide by shooting herself in the head.
151	17	"Everything's Different, Nothing's Changed"	David Warren	Annie Weisman	April 3, 2011	717	9.05
The housewives are shocked to discover Beth's suicide. Gabrielle is furious when Renee continues her neighborhood party as planned, leading Renee to reveal that her own mother killed herself when Renee was young. Bree becomes concerned about Andrew's drinking and tries to take him to an AA meeting. Recalling Beth's pain, Bree encourages Andrew to discuss his problems with her. Tom receives a lucrative job offer but declines it out of loyalty to Carlos; Lynette borrows an expensive sports car from the local car dealership and parks it in Carlos' driveway, convincing Tom to accept the new job. Paul tries to prevent Susan from receiving Beth's kidney, leading Mike to consult the hospital's lawyers. After Felicia reveals to Paul that Beth truly loved him, Paul allows Susan's transplant to continue in order to honor Beth's life. Felicia is given humanitarian release from prison and swears revenge against Paul.
152	18	"Moments in the Woods"	David Grossman	John Paul Bullock III	April 17, 2011	718	9.11
After Susan's kidney transplant is successful, Dick advises her to gamble because of her good luck. When Susan wins a poker game against the other housewives, she visits Dick to tell him about her winning streak, only to discover that he has died. Lynette is thrilled when Tom gives her a large portion of his $100,000 signing bonus, but is dismayed when he has to leave on a business trip on the night that she prepares a romantic dinner to celebrate. Felicia returns to Wisteria Lane and invites Paul to scatter Beth's ashes with her as a peace offering. It is later revealed that the scattered ashes were fake, with Felicia keeping the real ashes while vowing a more satisfying revenge on Paul. As part of his twelve-step program, Andrew wants to come clean to Carlos about running over his mother. When Carlos invites Andrew on a hunting trip in the woods, Bree and Gabrielle fear the worst and follow them, and Bree blurts out what Andrew did. Carlos forgives Andrew, but severs ties with Bree for hiding the truth and forbids Gabrielle from being friends with Bree.
153	19	"The Lies Ill-Concealed"	Larry Shaw	David Schladweiler	April 24, 2011	719	10.15
When Tom invites Lynette to accompany him to a prestigious business conference, she is disappointed to find that the seminars are unavailable to plus ones. Undeterred, Lynette wangles her way into a seminar and ends up publicly humiliating Tom, who confronts her for not supporting his career the way he had supported hers. Realizing that Paul has been depressed following Beth's suicide, Susan checks in on him and offers to cook a meal for him, which briefly causes friction between Susan and Mike. A flashback reveals that Karen witnessed Felicia faking her death and kept her secret. Felicia manipulates Karen into believing that Paul abused and mistreated Beth, resulting in her suicide, and Karen offers to keep an eye on Paul. As Carlos continues to ban Gabrielle from seeing Bree, the two women plan a secret spa weekend together. Carlos discovers Gabrielle's plans and forces her to choose between him and Bree, leading Gabrielle to take her daughters and temporarily move in with Bree.
154	20	"I'll Swallow Poison on Sunday"	David Warren	Jason Ganzel	May 1, 2011	720	9.44
Carlos tells Juanita about Bree's involvement in her grandmother's death, leading Juanita and Celia to believe that Bree killed their grandmother. After the girls call the police, believing that Bree is trying to kill them, Bree receives a visit from Detective Chuck Vance; Carlos arrives and clarifies the misunderstanding. Since Carlos still refuses to forgive Gabrielle for siding with Bree, Bree encourages Gabrielle to return home. Tom hires Lynette and Renee to redecorate his office in the style of a "hotshot" boss, but the two women disagree on a new design. Renee overrules Lynette to give Tom the office he wants, leading to another argument between Lynette and Tom over her lack of support. Susan begins cooking meals for Paul with the assistance of Felicia, who secretly adds antifreeze to the food, causing Paul's health to deteriorate. When Susan reveals that she and Mike can afford to return to Wisteria Lane, Paul accuses Susan of pretending to care about him to move back in and throws her out before suddenly collapsing.
155	21	"Then I Really Got Scared"	Larry Shaw	Valerie A. Brotski	May 8, 2011	721	10.00
Juanita is unable to sleep after watching a horror film, and claims that a mysterious man has been lurking outside the house at night. To prove this is not true, Gabrielle and Juanita sleep outside in a tent. When a shadowy figure approaches the tent, Gabrielle assumes it is Lee, who earlier played a prank on them, and turns the stranger away. Bree goes on a date with Chuck, only to find that they both ran a background check on each other, though they both eventually apologize and agree to have a normal first date. Lynette and Tom clash over where to go on their family vacation. After a tearful Penny witnesses their heated argument, Lynette and Tom decide to take a weekend trip together to salvage their marriage. Paul suspects that Susan is poisoning his food and confronts her just after Susan had given cookies intended for Paul to the Oakridge parents' committee. Susan realizes that Felicia is poisoning the food and leaves to warn the committee about the poisoned cookies. Paul arrives at the function with police officers, who arrest Susan.
156	22	"And Lots of Security..."	David Grossman	Joe Keenan	May 15, 2011	722	10.25
157	23	"Come on Over for Dinner"	Larry Shaw	Bob Daily	May 15, 2011	723	10.25
Susan is released from jail after Paul withdraws his accusations against her. Lee informs Bree that he recognizes Chuck as a regular patron at a gay bar; Chuck tells Bree that he had worked undercover at the bar. Lynette and Tom go on a romantic weekend getaway, but continue to fight throughout their trip. Fearing that she is being stalked by a strange man, Gabrielle is shocked to recognize the stalker as her abusive stepfather, who was presumed dead, and she begins practicing at a shooting range to obtain a legal permit. Felicia kidnaps Paul, hooks him up to a drip full of antifreeze, and records him confessing to killing Martha. Susan enters the house and calls the police; Felicia attacks Susan, but Paul breaks free and seizes Felicia by the throat. Paul ultimately releases Felicia, who flees before the police arrive, and Paul turns himself in for murdering Martha. As Felicia is driving away, she loses control of the car when Beth's ashes fall over and swerves directly into an oncoming truck. The Wisteria Lane residents prepare a progressive dinner to celebrate Susan and Mike's return to the lane. Gabrielle's stepfather, Alejandro Perez, follows her in his car and trails her into a wooded area; she holds him at gunpoint and forces him to admit he raped her when she was a teenager before telling him never to contact her again. Bree and Renee shop at the boutique of Doreen, Chuck's soon-to-be ex-wife, to speed up the divorce settlement; Doreen learns about Bree and Chuck's relationship and uses her knowledge to make additional property demands. Chuck complies with Doreen's demands just to be free of her, before he and Bree finally consummate their relationship. Lynette and Tom discuss their estrangement and ultimately agree to separate. Before the guests arrive at Gabrielle's house, Alejandro accosts her at her home, intending to rape her. Carlos strikes Alejandro in the head with a candlestick, killing him. Bree, Susan, and Lynette then arrive and help protect Carlos by hiding Alejandro's body inside a chest.

== Ratings ==
=== United States (On ABC) ===
Episode number Production number	Title	Original airing	Rating	Share	Rating/share (18–49)	Total viewers (in millions)	Rank per week	Note
135; 7-01	Remember Paul?	September 26, 2010	8.1	12	4.3	13.056	#15	
136; 7-02	You Must Meet My Wife	October 3, 2010	8.2	12	4.4	13.234	#13	
137; 7-03	Truly Content	October 10, 2010	7.9	12	3.9	12.379	#15	
138; 7-04	The Thing That Counts Is What's Inside	October 17, 2010	8.0	12	3.9	12.669	#12	
139; 7-05	Let Me Entertain You	October 24, 2010	7.7	12	3.9	12.159	#16	
140; 7-06	Excited and Scared	October 31, 2010	7.3	11	3.5	11.096	#24	
141; 7-07	A Humiliating Business	November 7, 2010	7.8	12	4.1	12.716	#12	
142; 7-08	Sorry Grateful	November 14, 2010	7.4	11	3.8	11.921	#18	
143; 7-09	Pleasant Little Kingdom	December 5, 2010	7.1	11	3.6	11.359	#11	
144; 7-10	Down the Block There's a Riot	December 12, 2010	7.4	11	3.6	11.598	#15	
145; 7-11	Assassins	January 2, 2011	7.5	12	3.8	12.194	#7	
146; 7-12	Where Do I Belong	January 9, 2011	8.0	12	3.9	12.831	#9	
147; 7-13	I'm Still Here	January 16, 2011	6.3	10	3.1	10.251	#17	
148; 7-14	Flashback	February 13, 2011	5.7	9	2.7	9.201	#28	
149; 7-15	Farewell Letter	February 20, 2011	6.5	10	3.1	10.580	#19	
150; 7-16	Searching	March 6, 2011	7.2	11	3.4	11.351	#11	
151; 7-17	Everything's Different, Nothing's Changed	April 3, 2011	5.8	9	2.9	9.047	#26	
152; 7-18	Moments in the Woods	April 17, 2011	5.9	9	2.7	9.105	#19	
153; 7-19	The Lies Ill-Concealed	April 24, 2011	6.2	10	3.1	10.150	#13	
154; 7-20	I'll Swallow Poison on Sunday	May 1, 2011	6.0	9	2.8	9.438*	#20	
155; 7-21	Then I Really Got Scared	May 8, 2011	6.2	10	2.9	10.001	#20	
156; 7-22	And Lots of Security...	May 15, 2011	6.6	10	3.1	10.251	#22	
157; 7-23	Come on Over for Dinner	May 15, 2011	6.6	10	3.1	10.251	#22	

^{*}This episode was interrupted during its original airing by the breaking news of Osama Bin Laden's death which may have resulted in a lower than expected rating than usual.

=== United Kingdom (On Channel 4) ===
In the UK, the season first airs on E4 on Sunday nights at 10 pm, and on Channel 4 on Wednesday nights at 10 pm.

Episode number	Title	Channel 4		E4 (+1)		Total viewers
Episode number	Title	Airdate	Viewers^{a}	Airdate	Viewers^{a}	Total viewers
135; 7-01	Remember Paul?	October 17, 2010	2.38m - #4	October 13, 2010	2.38m	2.38m
136; 7-02	You Must Meet My Wife	October 24, 2010	1.82m - #18	October 20, 2010	436,000 - #6	2.26m
137; 7-03	Truly Content	October 31, 2010	1.26m - #31	October 27, 2010	335,000 - #11	1.60m
138; 7-04	The Thing That Counts Is What's Inside	November 7, 2010	1.17m - #31	November 3, 2010	651,000 - #3 (389,000 - #1)	2.21m
139; 7-05	Let Me Entertain You	November 14, 2010*	1.07m - #31	November 10, 2010	232,000 - #11	1.30m
140; 7-06	Excited and Scared	November 21, 2010*	701,000 - #31	November 17, 2010	677,000 - #3 (210,000 - #4)	1.58m
141; 7-07	A Humiliating Business	November 28, 2010*	976,000 - #31	November 24, 2010	716,000 - #3 (294,000 - #1)	1.99m
142; 7-08	Sorry Grateful	December 5, 2010*	782,000 - #31	December 1, 2010	713,000 - #4 (356,000 - #1)	1.85m
143; 7-09	Pleasant Little Kingdom	December 12, 2010	748,000 - #29	December 8, 2010	682,000 - #4 (314,000 - #3)	1.74m
144; 7-10	Down the Block There's a Riot	December 19, 2010	750,000 - #31	December 15, 2010	784,000 - #5 (294,000 - #2)	1.83m
145; 7-11	Assassins	April 13, 2011	2.02m - #6	April 10, 2011	404,000 - #9	2.42m
146; 7-12	Where Do I Belong	April 20, 2011	1.35m - #16	April 17, 2011	531,000 - #6 (204,000 - #6)	2.09m
147; 7-13	I'm Still Here	April 27, 2011	1.49m - #13	April 24, 2011	621,000 - #2; 242,000 - #3	2.35m
148; 7-14	Flashback	May 4, 2011	900,000 - #31	May 1, 2011	722,000 - #2 (294,000 - #2)	1.92m
149; 7-15	Farewell Letter	May 11, 2011	900,000 - #31	May 8, 2011	646,000 - #2 (200,000 - #9)	1.75m
150; 7-16	Searching	May 18, 2011	810,000 - #31	May 15, 2011	734,000 - #2	1.54m
151; 7-17	Everything's Different, Nothing's Changed	May 25, 2011	1.35m - #21	May 22, 2011	669,000 - #2 (201,000 - #5)	2.22m
152; 7-18	Moments in the Woods	June 1, 2011	1.27m - #24	May 29, 2011	716,000 - #2	1.99m
153; 7-19	The Lies Ill-Concealed	June 8, 2011	800,000 - #31	June 5, 2011	765,000 - #1 (195,000 - #4)	1.76m
154; 7-20	I'll Swallow Poison on Sunday	June 15, 2011	830,000 - #31	June 12, 2011	686,000 - #2 (327,000 - #2)	1.84m
155; 7-21	Then I Really Got Scared	June 22, 2011	1.37m - #28	June 19, 2011	750,000 - #3 (235,000 - #2)	2.36m
156; 7-22	And Lots of Security...	June 29, 2011	828,000 -#31	June 26, 2011	842,000 - #1 (343,000 - #1)	2.01m
157; 7-23	Come on Over for Dinner	July 6, 2011	790,000 -#31	July 3, 2011	898,000 - #2 (302,000 - #2)	1.99m

^{a}Viewers in millions. ^{*}These 4 episodes aired at the later time of 10:30 pm on Channel 4.

The show took a break at Christmas until April and eventually returned to its previous time-slots of airing on E4 on Sundays, and on Channel 4 on Wednesdays. The series eventually returned on April 13, 2011 on Channel 4 and E4 from Sunday, April 17, 2011.

=== Canadian Ratings (On CTV) ===
Episode number Production number	Title	Original airing	Total viewers (in millions)	Rank per week
135; 7-01	Remember Paul?	September 26, 2010	1.284	#28
136; 7-02	You Must Meet My Wife	October 3, 2010	2.029	#14
137; 7-03	Truly Content	October 10, 2010	1.734	#17
138; 7-04	The Thing That Counts is What's Inside	October 17, 2010	2.003	#11
139; 7-05	Let Me Entertain You	October 24, 2010	1.511	#20
140; 7-06	Excited and Scared	October 31, 2010	2.116	#9
141; 7-07	A Humiliating Business	November 7, 2010	2.059	#9
142; 7-08	Sorry Grateful	November 14, 2010	2.093	#11
143; 7-09	Pleasant Little Kingdom	December 5, 2010	1.952	#8
144; 7-10	Down the Block There's a Riot	December 12, 2010	1.927	#10
145; 7-11	Assassins	January 2, 2011	1.799	#4
146; 7-12	Where Do I Belong	January 9, 2011	1.914	#8
147; 7-13	I'm Still Here	January 16, 2011	1.289	#21
148; 7-14	Flashback	February 13, 2011	1.297	N/A
149; 7-15	Farewell Letter	February 20, 2011	1.641	#23
150; 7-16	Searching	March 6, 2011	1.770	#16
151; 7-17	Everything's Different, Nothing's Changed	April 3, 2011	1.503	#18
152; 7-18	Moments in the Woods	April 17, 2011	1.596	#14
153; 7-19	The Lies Ill-Concealed	April 24, 2011	1.210	#22
154; 7-20	I'll Swallow Poison on Sunday	May 1, 2011	1.665	#13
155; 7-21	Then I Really Got Scared	May 8, 2011	1.052	N/A
156; 7-22	And Lots of Security...	May 15, 2011	1.386	#23
157; 7-23	Come on Over for Dinner	May 15, 2011	1.386	#23

=== New Zealand on TV2 ===
The Seventh Season began in New Zealand on 14 February 2011 around the time it always has in the 8:30 pm Monday time slot which it has had for all 7 years. The season ended on July 18, 2011 with the highest rating of the show since Season 5 of 525,000 viewers. It also marks the first time in the series history in which episodes have aired consistently each week with no breaks. This season average 418,555 viewers.

All ratings sourced from: Throng Ratings. The first episode premiered to what was a series low rating of only 375,000 viewers but was still one of the highest rating shows for the night. The next 2 episodes rose steadily while Episode 4 hit an impressive 444,790 viewers. Episode 5 managed to remain around this high while the next 4 episodes only managed to hover below 400,000. Episode 10 managed 431,000 viewers while Episode 11 dropped to just under 400,000. Episode 12 pulled in a massive 460,000 viewers and at that point was the highest rated episode of the season. Up until episode 21, the ratings moved between over 390,000 viewers to 430,000 viewers. Episode 21 hit over 450,000 viewers while Episode 22 hit a series low 370,090 viewers. Episode 23 (season finale) premiered after a television special and pulled in 525,575 viewers, the highest in nearly 3 years for the show.

Episode number	Title	Original airing	Viewers
135	Remember Paul?	February 14, 2011	375,350
136	You Must Meet My Wife	February 21, 2011	396,890
137	Truly Content	February 28, 2011	404,960
138	The Thing That Counts Is What's Inside	March 7, 2011	444,790
139	Let Me Entertain You	March 14, 2011	432,150
140	Excited and Scared	March 21, 2011	380,290
141	A Humiliating Business	March 28, 2011	389,740
142	Sorry Grateful	April 4, 2011	394,060
143	Pleasant Little Kingdom	April 11, 2011	378,980
144	Down the Block There's a Riot	April 18, 2011	431,520
145	Assassins	April 25, 2011	398,780
146	Where Do I Belong	May 2, 2011	460,080
147	I'm Still Here	May 9, 2011	391,410
148	Flashback	May 16, 2011	414,070
149	Farewell Letter	May 23, 2011	397,930
150	Searching	May 30, 2011	424,070
151	Everything's Different, Nothing's Changed	June 6, 2011	398,060
152	Moments in the Woods	June 13, 2011	423,630
153	The Lies Ill-Concealed	June 20, 2011	422,600
154	I'll Swallow Poison on Sunday	June 27, 2011	433,150
155	Then I Really Got Scared	July 4, 2011	451,520
156	And Lots of Security...	July 11, 2011	370,090
157	Come on Over for Dinner	July 18, 2011	525,470

=== Ireland On RTÉ 2 ===
- Desperate Housewives airs Tuesdays at 9:55 pm on RTÉ 2.
- All ratings below are supplied from The RTÉ Guide. The ratings are supplied by TAM Ireland/Nielsen TAM.
- Season 7 averaged 437,348 viewers, down a little from the sixth season's average.

Episode number	Title	Original airing	Timeslot	Viewers	Rank
135	Remember Paul?	October 12, 2010	9:55 pm	532,000	#2
136	You Must Meet My Wife	October 19, 2010	9:55 pm	464,000	#1
137	Truly Content	October 26, 2010	9:55 pm	447,000	#1
138	The Thing That Counts Is What's Inside	November 2, 2010	9:55 pm	485,000	#1
139	Let Me Entertain You	November 9, 2010	9:55 pm	415,000	#1
140	Excited and Scared	November 16, 2010	9:55 pm	434,000	#2
141	A Humiliating Business	November 23, 2010	9:55 pm	447,000	#1
142	Sorry Grateful	November 30, 2010	9:55 pm	448,000	#1
143	Pleasant Little Kingdom	December 7, 2010	9:55 pm	420,000	#1
144	Down the Block There's a Riot	December 14, 2010	9:55 pm	415,000	#1
145	Assassins	March 1, 2011	9:55 pm	499,000	#1
146	Where Do I Belong	March 8, 2011	9:55 pm	477,000	#2
147	I'm Still Here	March 15, 2011	9:55 pm	415,000	#2
148	Flashback	March 22, 2011	9:55 pm	452,000	#2
149	Farewell Letter	March 29, 2011	9:55 pm	440,000	#1
150	Searching	April 5, 2011	9:55 pm	427,000	#1
151	Everything's Different, Nothing's Changed	April 12, 2011	9:55 pm	389,000	#1
152	Moments in the Woods	April 19, 2011	9:55 pm	377,000	#1
153	The Lies Ill-Concealed	April 26, 2011	9:55 pm	409,000	#1
154	I'll Swallow Poison on Sunday	May 3, 2011	9:55 pm	386,000	#1
155	Then I Really Got Scared	May 10, 2011	10:05 pm*	410,000	#2
156	And Lots of Security...	May 17, 2011	9:55 pm	393,000	#1
157	Come on Over for Dinner	May 24, 2011	9:55 pm	478,000	#1

- Episode 155 was scheduled to start at 10:05 pm but was delayed until 10:15 pm due to the 2011 Eurovision Semi-Final 1 running 10 minutes over.

== DVD release ==
Desperate Housewives: The Complete Seventh Season (Wild, Wild Wisteria Edition)
Set details	Special features	
23 Episodes; 5-Disc Set; English (Dolby Digital 5.1 Surround); English SDH, Spanish & French subtitles; Runtime: 988 minutes	Desperate For Trivia - Discover how much the cast really remembers about their characters; Growing Up On Wisteria Lane - The younger cast reflects back on what it's like to be a kid on set; Bloopers; Deleted Scenes	
DVD release dates
Region 1	Region 2	Region 4
August 30, 2011	October 31, 2011	TBA
