= Wisteria Lane =

Fictional street in Desperate Housewives

- Desperate Housewives location
- Wisteria Lane map
- Created by: Marc Cherry
- Genre: Drama

Wisteria Lane is a fictional street at the center of U.S. television drama series Desperate Housewives. Desperate Housewives storylines primarily center on the residents of the street. The set for Wisteria Lane is located inside Universal Studios Hollywood, and is actually named Colonial Street, an area that has been used for many motion pictures and television shows. Other film and television productions in which Colonial Street has been featured include the original Leave It to Beaver series, Gremlins, The 'Burbs, and Buffy the Vampire Slayer.

== Production ==
In 2005, for the second season of Desperate Housewives, the street went through some heavy changes. During the first season only one part of the street had been seen on the show – the cul-de-sac at the end of the street, known as 'Circle Drive' among film crews, had been left out. Now the majority of the buildings and facades in this part of the street were either heavily remodeled or removed. Among the most noticeable changes were the removals of a church facade, seen on Murder, She Wrote, in order to make room for Edie's house, and of the so-called Colonial Mansion, which was replaced by a park. In the film Beethoven's 3rd (2000) the street can clearly be seen with the shops and the church still in place around 'Circle Drive'. The shot begins in circle drive at the shops then Mrs McCluskey's, Lynette's, Katherine's, Bree's, Susan's, Mary Alice's, Betty's and Gaby's are also in shot. The shot then continues into Gaby's driveway and then down the rest of the street. Colonial Street – including Circle Drive – has sixteen main buildings, with three of them located outside the Desperate Housewives filming area. The house closest to the settings, located next to what's called 4348 Wisteria Lane within the show, is being used by guards to stop any unauthorized access to "Wisteria Lane".

== Lots ==
The following overview is based upon details and maps given within the show as well as Universal Studios' official website - see below for further details.

=== No. 4344 ===
No.4344 This house was used only once on the show, in season 2. Lisa Sidmen and her son live there. This house is just an empty shell and is largely uncared for.

=== No. 4345 ===
No. 4345

This house has never been used on the show and was seen only once in season 5. It appears to be an old abandoned house.

=== No. 4346 ===
No. 4346

This house was owned by Sharon Shesin in season 2. Mona Clarke was shown living here with her husband and her children in season 5. After her death in season 6 it is assumed that the Clarke family moved out.

=== No. 4347 ===
No. 4347 is the Greenbergs' house. Ida Greenberg resides here in seasons 1-4. After her death, the house is temporarily occupied by Karen McCluskey. Since season 6 it has been occupied by Mitzi Kinsky. This house is actually a facade and has no interiors.

=== No. 4348 ===
No. 4348 is Rose Kemper's house from season 1 through season 5. In season 5 she goes to live in a nursing home, and it is unknown who resides there after. This house is in truth just an empty shell.

=== No. 4349 ===
No. 4349 is the home of Carlos and Gabrielle Solis, who have lived there since the summer of 2003. They move out to a mansion in Beverly Hills a year after the series ends. This house has an actual entry and living room. All other interiors shots are filmed on a soundstage in the studio. The backyard of this house (with pool and jacuzzi) was filmed on an actual house in San Fernando Valley.

=== No. 4350 ===
No. 4350 (commonly known as the Old Huber House) is owned in season 1 by Martha Huber, who had owned the house at least 14 years earlier as well. After her house burns down, Edie Britt resides with Martha until her new house is re-built. When Paul Young murders her, her sister Felicia Tilman moves in. Felicia stays in the house until the end of season two, where she frames Paul for her "death". This house has an actual first floor (entry, kitchen and living room). The second floor does not exist and was not rebuilt on a soundstage.

Bree Van de Kamp buys the house for her son Andrew Van de Kamp and his partner Alex Cominis in season five. They are still shown living there in season seven. In the middle of the season, Alex moves out because of Andrew's alcohol problems. By the second half of season eight, Andrew has to move out as well since he lost his job, so he moves back in with Bree.

=== No. 4351 ===
No. 4351 is the house of the Mullins Family for the vast majority of season 1. Then Betty Applewhite and her son Mathew Applewhite move in at the end of Season 1 and stay there for the duration of season 2. Then it is briefly owned by Alma Hodge during Season 3. Then, Beginning in season 4, it is owned by Bob Hunter and Lee McDermott. In season 7 Lee sells his house to Paul Young, and is implied to have gotten it back after Paul returned to prison.

The house for 4351 was strictly avoided by the Desperate Housewives filming crew during season one. This was because it was considered to be too recognizable since being the main setting of The Munsters. Following the decision to introduce the Applewhites, and having them living in the Munster home, the house was completely remodeled. This house has an actual first floor(entry, living room, kitchen and dining room). Second floor is rebuilt on a soundstage in the studio.

=== No. 4352 ===
No. 4352 is the home of Mary Alice Young. In season five the house has been painted green and the archway and the beginning of the house has been removed. The Youngs moved in the house in 1990.

In season one, Mary Alice kills herself and leaves the house to be maintained by her husband Paul Young and her son Zachary Young. The two remain in the house until season two, when Paul is arrested for the apparent murder of Felicia Tilman, and Zach inherits his grandfather's fortune. The house is then put on the market by Edie Britt, who sells it to Arthur Shepherd. Art moves out after his sister's death and the residents convincing themselves that he is a pedophile.

In season five, the house is bought by Edie and Dave Williams who rents the house out to Mike Delfino. Mike stays in the house until he moves into Katherine Mayfair's house.

In season six, the Bolen family moves in. The family stay in the house until the end of the season, where Angie Bolen and Nick Bolen move to Atlanta, and their son Danny Bolen goes to New York.

In season seven, the house is reclaimed by Paul Young, who lives across the road in Susan's house. Towards the end of season seven, Paul Young confesses about Martha Huber's murder. In season eight, the resident of 4352 is unknown.

This house has a partial first floor (entry, living room and dining room). All other inside shots(kitchen, family room and second floor) are filmed on a soundstage in the studio. The house is a reproduction of the original Leave it to Beaver house and was constructed for the 1997 Universal film of the same name.

=== No. 4353 ===
No. 4353 is Susan Mayer's house. Paul Young rented the house throughout the seventh season, with his new wife Beth Young, until Beth kills herself, and Paul soon lets Susan and Mike move back in.

The Mayers moved into the house in 1992. Before season one, Susan lived in the house with her husband Karl Mayer, they divorced and throughout the first four seasons, Susan lived with her daughter Julie Mayer. Her off-and-on relationship meant that Mike Delfino often stayed. At the end of season three, Susan and Mike married, so Mike became a permanent resident.

They remained together in season four. At the end of season four, Julie moved out to go to college, and Susan gave birth to Maynard James Delfino. In season five, Susan and Mike divorced, and Susan started seeing Jackson Braddock. Jackson wanted to move in, but Susan did not allow him to. At the end of season five, Susan and Mike remarried and live in 4353 for season 6.

At the end of season six, Susan and Mike move to an apartment and rent out their house due to financial troubles; unknown to them, Paul Young moves in with his wife Beth. In season seven, Paul finds out the truth about Beth and he throws her out.

In the end of season seven, Mike, Susan and MJ all move back into 4353, when Paul Young is arrested for murder. In season eight, they came back on the lane, but later Mike was murdered by a loan shark. Susan decides to sell her house at the end of the series to a couple named Jennifer and Steve, who are hiding a secret. This house has an actual entry, a dining room and a kitchen. All other interior shots (living room and second floor) are filmed on a soundstage in the studio.

=== No. 4354 ===
No. 4354 is Bree and Rex Van de Kamp's house. Together in this house, they raised their children, Andrew Van de Kamp and Danielle Van de Kamp. They moved into the house in 1994.

In season three, Bree remarries to Orson Hodge and he becomes a permanent resident in the house. Gloria Hodge, Orson's mother also moves in, a few episodes later and remains until she is kicked out by Bree.

In season four, Danielle gives birth to Benjamin Hodge and he stays in Bree's care until season five. With this, both Andrew and Danielle move out as well. Also at the end of season four, Orson goes to jail for Bree and stays there for three years. When he is released, he returns to the home.

In season five Bree's garage has been reconverted into her and Katherine's test kitchen. The ground floor contains the kitchen and the top floor contains their offices.

At the close of season six, Orson moves out after asking for a divorce. In season seven Bree's contractor boyfriend Keith moves in with her. But when Keith finds out he has a son, the relationship starts to crumble. He tries to get Bree to move to Florida but it ends up in only him leaving. In season eight, Andrew moves back in due to financial reasons.

Three years after the series end, Bree and her former lawyer/new husband, Trip Weston, move off the lane to Kentucky.

This house has no interiors, with it being used as a break room for the cast and crew. Along with Lynette's house, it is one of only two houses to have a backyard on the Colonial Street set.

=== No. 4355 ===
No. 4355 is the Scavos' house. Since the beginning Lynette and Tom Scavo have owned the house. They moved into the house in 1997, living there with their five children, Preston Scavo, Porter Scavo, Parker Scavo, Penny Scavo, Paige Scavo, and Kayla Huttington Scavo. Kayla lives in the house full-time for the middle of season three and all of season four. In season seven, Porter and Preston move out. By the end of season seven, Lynette and Tom decide to separate and divorce after a long fight between the two. In season eight Tom moves out and the twins, Porter and Preston, move back in temporarily. Tom moves back in during the two part finale as they reconcile. They move out four weeks later to New York City where they live in a penthouse overlooking Central Park. This house is just a shell with no interiors. Interior shots are filmed on a soundstage in the studio.

=== No. 4356 ===
No. 4356 is commonly known as the Simms House (before season one), The Delfino House (first three seasons), Mayfair House (season four to season six), the Graham House (first half of season seven) and then The Tilman House (middle of season seven to end of season seven). It is assumed that Katherine Mayfair sold the house to Emma Graham (Dana Glover), and then she sold it to Paul in season 7. Felicia Tilman was the owner of the house after inheriting it from her daughter, Beth. Ben Faulkner moved into the house at the start of season eight. It is not known whether Ben still lives in this house or if he moved in with his new wife Renee.

=== No. 4358 ===
No. 4358 is the home of Karen McCluskey. She is one of the oldest residents on the lane and has lived there for 35 years. After the tornado in "Something's Coming", Karen's home was completely destroyed. A replacement blue house has been constructed in time for the fifth season. This house has a working second floor.

In season six, Karen starts a relationship with Roy Bender and he moves in. They marry in between the end of season six and beginning of season seven. Not wanting to return to Bree, Orson Hodge had arranged to stay with them, but Bree took him back.

Karen dies in the series finale so the house is only occupied by Roy.

=== No. 4362 ===
No. 4362 is the home of Edie Britt until her death in season five. She moved onto the Lane sometime in early 2003. The original house was burned down by Susan Mayer in the pilot episode. The house was rebuilt for season two in 2005.

At the beginning of season seven, the house was rented by Renee Perry, a college friend of Lynette's. It is not known whether Renee still lives in this house or if she moved in with her new husband Ben. For unknown reasons, in episodes "Sorry Grateful" and "Finishing the Hat" the numbers on the door of Renee's house were changed to 4359.

== Residents ==
These are the known residents of Wisteria Lane, covering episodes (1.01—5.24). Note that no residents 4348 (Drew House) and 4360 Wisteria Lane have been mentioned, although an unnamed woman, played by an uncredited actress, is seen living in no. 4360 in episode 4.02. Also in Season 2, there is a black haired woman living here. In Season 3, there is a blonde haired cheating housewife here. Also, in Season 3, Mrs McCluskey is seen reporting a man washing his pet Pig on the lawn of 4360. Most likely neighborhood big mouth Mona Clark lives here, although in Season 5 she is shown living at the Corner House.

Image	Address	Former name (Pre-series)	Family	Residents	Past Productions
	4347 Wisteria Lane	Delta House Keller Home	Greenberg	Ida Greenberg (Until 2007)	All My Sons (1948) sound stage 12 set - Keller house - colonial street river road 1950 to 1980; The Desperate Hours (1955); Delta House (1979)
	4347 Wisteria Lane	Delta House Keller Home	McCluskey	Karen McCluskey (2008)	All My Sons (1948) sound stage 12 set - Keller house - colonial street river road 1950 to 1980; The Desperate Hours (1955); Delta House (1979)
	4347 Wisteria Lane	Delta House Keller Home	Kinsky	Mitzi Kinsky (Since 2016)	All My Sons (1948) sound stage 12 set - Keller house - colonial street river road 1950 to 1980; The Desperate Hours (1955); Delta House (1979)
	4349 Wisteria Lane	Allison Home Dowd Home	Solis	Gabrielle Solis (2003-2020); Carlos Solis (2003-2006, 2008-2020); Xiao-Mei (2006); Juanita Solis (2008-2020); Celia Solis (2012-2020); Ana Solis (2016)	So Goes My Love (1946) sound stage 12 set (1946); Harvey (1950); James Stewart as Elwood P. Dowd in Harvey (1950); Psycho House (1960) was created by using stock units from the Allison façade - In 1966 Psycho House Blueprint was relabeled "Stock Units" from the Chicken House; The Ghost and Mr. Chicken (1966); Rock-a-Bye Baby (1958); The Shaggy Dog (1959); The Munsters (1964); Lucas Tanner (1974–75); Colonial Street - River Road backlot location 1950 to 1980
	4350 Wisteria Lane	Cromwell Home or Pink Palace Dragnet House	Huber	Martha Huber (Until 2004); Mr. Huber (Until 1990)	One Desire (1955) Cromwell House - home of Anne Baxter as Tacey Cromwell; Dragnet TV Series; Adam 12 TV series; The Car (1977)
	4350 Wisteria Lane	Cromwell Home or Pink Palace Dragnet House	Tilman	Felicia Tilman (2005-2006)	One Desire (1955) Cromwell House - home of Anne Baxter as Tacey Cromwell; Dragnet TV Series; Adam 12 TV series; The Car (1977)
	4350 Wisteria Lane	Cromwell Home or Pink Palace Dragnet House	Adams	Unnamed (2007-2014)	One Desire (1955) Cromwell House - home of Anne Baxter as Tacey Cromwell; Dragnet TV Series; Adam 12 TV series; The Car (1977)
	4350 Wisteria Lane	Cromwell Home or Pink Palace Dragnet House	Cominis/Van de Kamp	Alex Cominis (2014-2017); Andrew Van de Kamp (2014-2018)	One Desire (1955) Cromwell House - home of Anne Baxter as Tacey Cromwell; Dragnet TV Series; Adam 12 TV series; The Car (1977)
	4351 Wisteria Lane	Munster Home (originally Maxim house)	Mullins	Edwin Mullins & Mrs. Mullins (Until 2005)	So Goes My Love(1946) sound stage 12 set (1946); One Desire (1955) home of Rock Hudson; The Munsters (1964–1966); Colonial Street - River Road backlot location 1950 to 1980
	4351 Wisteria Lane	Munster Home (originally Maxim house)	Applewhites	Betty Applewhite (2005-2006); Matthew Applewhite (2005-2006); Caleb Applewhite (2005-2006)	So Goes My Love(1946) sound stage 12 set (1946); One Desire (1955) home of Rock Hudson; The Munsters (1964–1966); Colonial Street - River Road backlot location 1950 to 1980
	4351 Wisteria Lane	Munster Home (originally Maxim house)	Hodges	Alma Hodge (2006); Gloria Hodge (2006)	So Goes My Love(1946) sound stage 12 set (1946); One Desire (1955) home of Rock Hudson; The Munsters (1964–1966); Colonial Street - River Road backlot location 1950 to 1980
	4351 Wisteria Lane	Munster Home (originally Maxim house)	Hunter/McDermott	Bob Hunter (Since 2007); Lee McDermott (Since 2007, except 2017); Jenny Hunter-McDermott (Since 2018)	So Goes My Love(1946) sound stage 12 set (1946); One Desire (1955) home of Rock Hudson; The Munsters (1964–1966); Colonial Street - River Road backlot location 1950 to 1980
	4352 Wisteria Lane	Leave It To Beaver House; Morrison Home	Youngs	Mary Alice Young (1990-2004); Paul Young (1990-2006); Zach Young (1990–2006)	Before 1997, the house on this lot was the "Morrison" house; Morrison House - River Lady (1948); The Desperate Hours (1955); Leave It to Beaver (original TV series) The Cleaver home at "211 Pine Street" from 1959 to 1963; Send Me No Flowers (1964) with first-floor facade alterations; Marcus Welby, M.D. from 1969 to 1976; The Burbs (1988) (Home of Tom Hanks); Leave It to Beaver (1997 movie); Tucker (2000) CBS Pilot; The Bill Engvall Show (2007); The United States of Tara (2010) Episode; Malcolm in the Middle, Episode: "The Book Club" (2001); Ted, Bennett Home (2024)
	4352 Wisteria Lane	Leave It To Beaver House; Morrison Home	Shepherds	Art Shepherd (2006); Rebecca Shepherd (2006)	
	4352 Wisteria Lane	Leave It To Beaver House; Morrison Home	Hudson	Mrs. Hudson (2008-2013)	
	4352 Wisteria Lane	Leave It To Beaver House; Morrison Home	Delfino/Williams	Mike Delfino (2014-2015); Dave Williams (2015)	
	4352 Wisteria Lane	Leave It To Beaver House; Morrison Home	Bolens	Angie Bolen (2016-2017); Nick Bolen (2016-2017); Danny Bolen (2016-2017)	
	4353 Wisteria Lane	Ron's Barn Johnson Home	Mayers/Delfinos	Susan Mayer (1992-2017, 2018-2019); Karl Mayer (1992-2003); Julie Mayer (1992-2008, 2016-2017 and 2019); Mike Delfino (2007-2012, 2016-2017 and 2018-2019); Sophie Bremmer (2005); M.J. Delfino (2008-2017, 2018-2019)	* "Ron's Barn - Rock Hudson as Ron Kirby - 1955" - All That Heaven Allows: The Hardy Boys (1977–79); Colonial Street - River Road backlot location 1950 to 1980; The New Lassie (1989); Deep Impact (1998)
	4353 Wisteria Lane	Ron's Barn Johnson Home	Youngs	Paul Young (2017-2018); Beth Young (2017-2018)	* "Ron's Barn - Rock Hudson as Ron Kirby - 1955" - All That Heaven Allows: The Hardy Boys (1977–79); Colonial Street - River Road backlot location 1950 to 1980; The New Lassie (1989); Deep Impact (1998)
	4353 Wisteria Lane	Ron's Barn Johnson Home	Jennifer/Steve	Jennifer (Since 2019); Steve (Since 2019)	* "Ron's Barn - Rock Hudson as Ron Kirby - 1955" - All That Heaven Allows: The Hardy Boys (1977–79); Colonial Street - River Road backlot location 1950 to 1980; The New Lassie (1989); Deep Impact (1998)
	4354 Wisteria Lane	Klopek Home	Van de Kamps/Hodges	Bree Van de Kamp (1994-2022); Rex Van de Kamp (1994-2005); Andrew Van de Kamp (1994-2007 and since 2019); Danielle Van de Kamp (1994-2007); Orson Hodge (2006-2008, 2011-2017); Gloria Hodge (2006); Benjamin Hodge (2007-2011); Keith Watson (2017); Trip Weston (2019-2022)	Dr. Werner Klopek Home - The Burbs (1989) - redesign for the Providence (TV series) in the summer of 1988 built on the location of the former Beaver House (TV Series & TV Movie)/ Marcus Welby M. D./ Desperate Hours-Paramount house; Providence (1999–2002)
	4355 Wisteria Lane	Dana Home	Scavos	Lynette Scavo (1997-2019); Tom Scavo (1997-2018, 2019); Porter Scavo (1998-2019); Preston Scavo (1998-2019); Parker Scavo (1998-2019); Penny Scavo (2004-2019); Paige Scavo (2017-2019); Kayla Huntington-Scavo (2006-2008); Stella Wingfield (2007)	Nice Girl! (1941) Deanna Durbin - Dana Family; Bedtime for Bonzo (1951); All I Desire (1953); The Thrill of it All (1963)
	4356 Wisteria Lane	Walter's House - "The Burbs"	Delfino/Solis	Mike Delfino (2004-2007, 2013); Carlos Solis (2006-2007)	In summer 1988 - Walter's House blocked the entrance to Circle Drive; season one - entrance to Circle Drive was blocked by a house later destroyed in a fire; After the production of the Burbs: Walter's house move to the former location of the Hubbart Home - "Another Part of the Forest" sound stage set; In summer of 1988 the "Hubbart Home" and the Beaver Home (TV series & TV movie) were moved to a location south of falls lake; Malcolm in the Middle, Episode: "The Book Club" (2001)
	4356 Wisteria Lane	Walter's House - "The Burbs"	Simms/Mayfairs	Lillian Simms (Until 2004 and briefly in 2007); Katherine Mayfair (1994-1995 and 2007-2017); Dylan Davis (1994-1995); Adam Mayfair (2007); Dylan Mayfair (2007-2008); Robin Gallagher (2017)	In summer 1988 - Walter's House blocked the entrance to Circle Drive; season one - entrance to Circle Drive was blocked by a house later destroyed in a fire; After the production of the Burbs: Walter's house move to the former location of the Hubbart Home - "Another Part of the Forest" sound stage set; In summer of 1988 the "Hubbart Home" and the Beaver Home (TV series & TV movie) were moved to a location south of falls lake; Malcolm in the Middle, Episode: "The Book Club" (2001)
	4356 Wisteria Lane	Walter's House - "The Burbs"	Grahams	Emma Graham with her husband and their daughter (2015)	In summer 1988 - Walter's House blocked the entrance to Circle Drive; season one - entrance to Circle Drive was blocked by a house later destroyed in a fire; After the production of the Burbs: Walter's house move to the former location of the Hubbart Home - "Another Part of the Forest" sound stage set; In summer of 1988 the "Hubbart Home" and the Beaver Home (TV series & TV movie) were moved to a location south of falls lake; Malcolm in the Middle, Episode: "The Book Club" (2001)
	4356 Wisteria Lane	Walter's House - "The Burbs"	Tilman	Felicia Tilman (2017)	In summer 1988 - Walter's House blocked the entrance to Circle Drive; season one - entrance to Circle Drive was blocked by a house later destroyed in a fire; After the production of the Burbs: Walter's house move to the former location of the Hubbart Home - "Another Part of the Forest" sound stage set; In summer of 1988 the "Hubbart Home" and the Beaver Home (TV series & TV movie) were moved to a location south of falls lake; Malcolm in the Middle, Episode: "The Book Club" (2001)
	4356 Wisteria Lane	Walter's House - "The Burbs"	Faulkner	Ben Faulkner (Since 2018)	In summer 1988 - Walter's House blocked the entrance to Circle Drive; season one - entrance to Circle Drive was blocked by a house later destroyed in a fire; After the production of the Burbs: Walter's house move to the former location of the Hubbart Home - "Another Part of the Forest" sound stage set; In summer of 1988 the "Hubbart Home" and the Beaver Home (TV series & TV movie) were moved to a location south of falls lake; Malcolm in the Middle, Episode: "The Book Club" (2001)
	4358 Wisteria Lane	Not named replaced McCluskey home destroyed in tornado House façade dated back to the silent era - Uncle Tom's cabin	McCluskey	Karen McCluskey (1983-2019); Gilbert McCluskey (1983-1997); Roy Bender (Since 2016)	
	4362 / 4359 Wisteria Lane	Not named	Britt/Williams	Edie Britt (2003-2008 and 2013-2015); Umberto Rothwell (2003-2004); Karl Mayer (2005-2006); Austin McCann (2006-2007); Travers McLain (2007); Carlos Solis (2007); Raymond (2008-2013); Dave Williams (2013-2016); Stephanie (2016-2017); Lance (2016-2017)	Built for season two, after Susan burned the original down in the pilot episode
	4362 / 4359 Wisteria Lane	Not named	Perry	Renee Perry (Since 2017)	Built for season two, after Susan burned the original down in the pilot episode

=== Changes ===
Before the large changes to the set after Season One, 4360 and 4362 Wisteria Lane, as well as the park, situated around the cul-de-sac, were not shown.

Where 4360 Wisteria Lane was built, was formerly store façades and a school façade. At 4362, Edie Britt's home, was originally a church façade that was removed. That church was seen in Murder, She Wrote (1984) as "Cabot Cove's community church". Where the park is now (see map), was previously a relatively larger home, "Colonial Mansion." In season 1 Susan Mayer burns down Edie Britt's house and there are changes to the kitchen and exterior.

Before the start of Season 4, Mike's old house is completely remodeled. The walls around the staircase have been torn down to open up the ground floor completely. Both the upstairs and downstairs are re-wallpapered with bright reds and pastel colors.

After the tornado in "Something's Coming", Karen McCluskey's home was completely destroyed. A replacement blue house has been constructed in time for the fifth season. This house has a working 2nd floor. In addition to this, the former residence of Mary Alice Young has been painted green and the archway and the beginning of the house has been removed. Bree's garage has been reconverted into her and Katherine's test kitchen. The ground floor contains the kitchen and the top floor contains their offices. Also in season five 4350, the former home of Martha Huber and Felicia Tilman has been painted a pale yellow - green color however by the time of season six it has been restored to its original color, green.

It is revealed during "Color and Light" (Season 2) that Mona Clark lived at number 4360. But in season 5 and 6 we can see that she lived in 4348. She was, however, strictly a background character and was even credited at Mother #2, until her death in the Season 6 episode "If...".

== Official maps ==
=== 1989-1996 Colonial Street map ===
The official website of Universal Studios Hollywood presents a map of Colonial Street, as it looked between 1989 and 1996. Besides the changes made during the first year of Desperate Housewives, the main difference between this map and the current look of the street is that the houses known in Desperate Housewives as 4352 Wisteria Lane and 4354 Wisteria Lane (Mary Alice's and Bree's houses) replaced two older buildings in 1996. (Note: Another map, showing the street during the same era, but with higher resolution can be viewed here, along with an air photo taken in 2004.)

=== Mike's map ===
In episode two of Desperate Housewives, "Ah, But Underneath", a map of the street and details about its residents is seen in one of Mike's lockers. This map confirms the location of Susan's, Lynette's, Gabrielle's, Bree's, Mary Alice's, Mike's and Martha Huber's houses, as well as the existence of one house between Susan's and Gabrielle's, one house beyond Gabrielle's and one house beyond Mike's. However, it does not cover the part of the street that include the house on the far side of Martha Huber's house, nor the buildings around the cul-de-sac, which wasn't included in the show's setting at the time. With two exceptions, all ten houses have the same number as otherwise stated in the series.

There are some differences between Mike's map and the established version:

- Although most house numbers are the same as otherwise stated, there are two exceptions: The house between Susan's and Gabrielle's houses (later known as the Applewhite house) is noted as 4354, and Bree's house is said to be 4359. Generally these houses are shown to be 4351 and 4354 Wisteria Lane, respectively, with Mike's map being the only exception.
- The residents of the house between the houses of Gabrielle and of Susan are said to be Trent and Debra Nelson, although the Mullins is mentioned in the dialogue earlier in the same episode. This is the only time the Nelson's names has occurred in the series.
- The resident of 4347 Wisteria Lane is not said to be Ida Greenberg - this character is not introduced until episode five, "Come In, Stranger". Instead there are two other names noted, but too blurry to be read properly. However, Morris, their last name, is readable. Also, one of them seems to be named Gary, and they're 42 and 38 years old respectively.
- Also to be noted is that Lynette's daughter Penny is called Daisy on the map.

In addition, although the camera briefly passes by 4358 Wisteria Lane - the house that (starting with episode 14, "Love Is in the Air") would be known as Karen McCluskey's home - it turns away before any names are shown.

=== "Behind Closed Doors" map ===
A map of Wisteria Lane is also included in the official season one companion book, Desperate Housewives: Behind Closed Doors, published in 2005. This map does not show the house numbers but confirms the existence and location of most Wisteria Lane houses to appear on the show. The exceptions are the three buildings beyond Karen McCluskey's house, which were not added to the shows filming location until season two. Also - while most of the houses on the map are labeled "The Scavo House", "The Young House" etc., the houses now known as the McCluskey house, the Greenberg house and 4348 Wisteria Lane, are left without any description.

== See also ==
- Colonial Street
- Courthouse Square
- RKO Forty Acres
