= Remember Paul? =

- Desperate Housewives episode
- Episode no.: Season 7 Episode 1
- Directed by: David Grossman
- Written by: Marc Cherry
- Production code: 701
- Original air date: September 26, 2010
- Running time: 43 minutes

Guest appearances
- Lainie Kazan as Maxine Rosen; Harriet Sansom Harris as Felicia Tilman; Max Carver as Preston Scavo; Christine Estabrook as Martha Huber; Kevin Symons as Jack Pinkham; Kyle MacLachlan as Orson Hodge; Steven Culp as Rex Van de Kamp; Brian Austin Green as Keith Watson; Michael Kagan as Board Chairman; Martin Kildare as Mr. Roarke; Michelle Duffy as Judy; Bonnie Bailey-Reed as Gwen; Karly Rothenberg as Woman in Prison

Episode chronology
← Previous "I Guess This is Goodbye"	Next → "You Must Meet My Wife"
- Desperate Housewives season 7

"Remember Paul?" is the seventh season premiere episode of the American comedy-drama television series Desperate Housewives, and the 135th overall episode of the series. It was originally broadcast in the United States on September 26, 2010, on the American Broadcasting Company (ABC). In the episode, Paul (Mark Moses) announces his return to Wisteria Lane while Carlos (Ricardo Chavira) learns that his daughter was accidentally switched with another baby at the hospital eight years earlier.

The episode was written by series creator Marc Cherry and directed by David Grossman. It included the introduction of Renee Perry (Vanessa Williams), Lynette's (Felicity Huffman) former college roommate. "Remember Paul?" also dealt with Bree's (Marcia Cross) divorce and continued the storyline of the financial problems of Susan (Teri Hatcher) and Mike (James Denton).

"Remember Paul?" garnered generally mixed reviews. Many critics drew both favorable and unfavorable comparisons between Williams' performance in the episode and her portrayal of Wilhelmina Slater in Ugly Betty. According to Nielsen ratings, the episode drew just over 13 million viewers, making it the least watched season premiere at the time.

== Plot ==
=== Background ===
Desperate Housewives focuses on the lives of several residents in the suburban neighborhood of Wisteria Lane, as narrated by their deceased neighbor, Mary Alice Young (Brenda Strong). In past episodes, a local hospital discovered that a nurse had accidentally switched two children at birth years earlier and that one of the involved families lives in town on Wisteria Lane. Bree Hodge (Marcia Cross) decided to confess to Gabrielle Solis (Eva Longoria) that her son, Andrew (Shawn Pyfrom), was driving the car that killed Gabrielle's mother-in-law eleven years earlier. As a result, her husband Orson (Kyle MacLachlan) decided to leave her. Susan (Teri Hatcher) and Mike Delfino (James Denton) slipped into financial crisis and decided to move into a small apartment across town. Mary Alice's husband, Paul (Mark Moses), avenged her suicide by killing her blackmailer, Martha Huber (Christine Estabrook). In response, her sister, Felicia Tilman (Harriet Sansom Harris), framed Paul for her own death and fled town. Ten years later, Paul was released from jail and returned to Wisteria Lane.

=== Episode ===
News of Paul's return jolts the neighborhood, including Susan, who did not know that she had rented her home to him. Paul expresses interest in buying his old home across the street, despite just having signed a lease for Susan's house. Felicia, whose plan was foiled when she was pulled over by a police officer for speeding, is now incarcerated and swears that Paul will be dead within six months.

Jack Pinkham (Kevin Symons), a lawyer for Fairview Memorial Hospital, tells Carlos Solis (Ricardo Antonio Chavira) that his daughter, Juanita (Madison De La Garza), is not their biological child and was accidentally switched at birth with their daughter. Carlos decides to keep this information from Gabrielle to spare her the pain. Meanwhile, Bree tells Gabrielle that Andrew ran over Carlos' mother, but Gabrielle decides not to tell Carlos because she does not want to upset him.

Despite downsizing to a small apartment, Susan and Mike are still struggling financially. Susan receives an offer from her landlord, Maxine Rosen (Lainie Kazan), to appear on her home-run erotic website—"Va-Va-Va-Broom!"—for which she would film herself doing housework in lingerie. She initially refuses the offer, but when Mike considers taking a job on an oil rig in Alaska, Susan agrees to appear on the website; however, she conceals her new job from her friends and family.

Bree struggles with her impending divorce. However, when Orson reveals that he has already begun dating his physical therapist, Bree takes an interest in her contractor, Keith (Brian Austin Green). Meanwhile, Lynette's old college frenemy Renee Perry (Vanessa Williams), wife of New York Yankees player Doug Perry, comes to visit her, but their friendly bickering quickly escalates into an argument. Lynette threatens to kick her out but changes her mind when Renee reveals that Doug has left her for another woman.

== Production ==
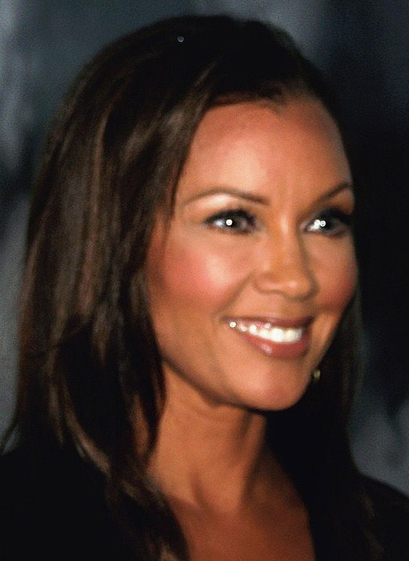
Vanessa Williams made her debut appearance in this episode as New York socialite Renee Perry.

"Remember Paul?" was written by series creator and executive producer Marc Cherry and directed by David Grossman. It marked the debut of Vanessa Williams as Renee Perry, an old college rival of Lynette Scavo. The addition of Williams to the cast was announced after the close of the series' sixth season, as well as the finale of the ABC series Ugly Betty, in which Williams starred as Wilhelmina Slater. The character, who was originally named Renee Filmore-Jones, was conceived as a trouble-making vixen, similar to the Edie Britt character (Nicollette Sheridan), who appeared on the series until the fifth season. Following the casting announcement, Williams admitted to having been a fan of the series during its first year, but stopped watching because of the racially insensitive second season mystery storyline. It focused on Betty Applewhite (Alfre Woodard), the series' first black main character. Williams explained to Entertainment Weekly, "[Betty] had her son in chains in the basement. It was like, 'Really? Do we have to go there with our first Black character?' I honestly fell off the show after that. I think it was just so implausible and just an image that Black folks don't want to see their child chained and shackled in the basement." Cast member Felicity Huffman commented on Williams' addition to the cast, saying "She's such a great dash of vinegar to Wisteria Lane! It's going brilliantly—she's a wonderful woman, she's really smart, she's really strong, a real team player. She's a great addition."

The episode also reintroduced the storyline of Paul Young and Felicia Tilman's rivalry. Mark Moses returned to the series as a series regular after appearing briefly as Paul in the sixth season finale. On his return, Moses commented, "There was some talk about [me coming back] a year ago. And there’s often talk in Hollywood. Sometimes it pans out, sometimes it doesn’t. I don’t get super-excited about a 'maybe' in this town, because there are lots of maybes that don’t happen. But then this last year they called up my agent and said, 'We're really thinking seriously about [this].' And eventually, they made an offer, and I was very pleased." Harriet Samson Harris also returned to reprise her role as Felicia, while Steven Culp and Christine Estabrook returned as Rex Van de Kamp and Martha Huber respectively in flashback sequences. Kyle MacLachlan, who left Desperate Housewives as a series regular at the end of season six, reprised his role as Orson Hodge in this episode.

Kevin Rahm and Tuc Watkins, who have been portraying gay couple Bob Hunter and Lee McDermott since the series' fourth season, were both promoted to series regulars for the seventh season. Darcy Rose Byrnes also joined the main cast as Penny Scavo, a role previously portrayed by Kendall Applegate. Brian Austin Green made his series debut in the episode as Keith Watson, "a new contractor and charming playboy" who catches the attention of both Bree and Renee, while Lainie Kazan began a multi-episode guest appearance as Maxine Rosen, Susan's landlady.

== Reception ==
=== Ratings ===
According to Nielsen ratings, "Remember Paul?" was watched by 13.056 million viewers and held an 8.1 rating/12 share on its original American broadcast on September 26, 2010. Among viewers between 18 and 49 years of age, the episode drew a 4.3 rating, making it the twelfth most-watched show for the week in that demographic. The premiere was outperformed by Sunday Night Football on NBC and Family Guy on Fox, which respectively drew a 7.3 and 4.5 rating in the 18 to 49 demographic in the Desperate Housewives time slot. At the time, the episode was the least-watched season premiere of Desperate Housewives, with an eleven percent decrease in viewership from the sixth season premiere one year earlier. ABC reported that the episode gained an additional 2.1 million viewers and 1.0 rating in the week following the original broadcast due to DVR recordings. "Remember Paul?" was outperformed by the following episode, "You Must Meet My Wife", which drew 13.234 million viewers and scored 8.2 rating/12 share in total viewers and a 4.4 rating in viewers between 18 and 49 years of age.

=== Critical reception ===
Moving the former Ugly Betty star [Vanessa Williams] onto ABC's Sunday-night franchise was a smart, smart move[...] That's not to say that our four principal actresses have stopped delivering. But let's be honest, new blood is a crucial ingredient for any soap to chug along into its seventh season.

— Tanner Stransky, Entertainment Weekly

The episode received mixed reviews. Tanner Stransky of Entertainment Weekly gave the premiere a positive review. He praised Williams' performance, stating that she brought back a "brand of bitchery" that had been missing from the series since Nicollette Sheridan's departure; additionally, he favorably compared the performance to Williams' portrayal of Wilhelmina Slater on Ugly Betty. He also complimented Harriet Sansom Harris' performance, naming her "the creepiest character... in the best possible way." Stransky called the Gabrielle and Carlos storyline "sweet," but criticized the ridiculousness of Susan's storyline. Neal Justin of the Star Tribune said, "the premiere is packed with the zippy zingers that made us fall in love with the dramedy in the first place," accrediting the series' improved quality over season six to the return of Mark Moses as Paul Young. He also commented that Vanessa Williams gave "a repeat performance" of her character on Ugly Betty. Damian Holbrook of TV Guide also drew a comparison between Williams' performances in the episode and on Ugly Betty, stating the two characters "have the same stiletto-sharp tongue and prickly chemistry with everyone who enters her orbit."

John Griffiths of Us Weekly gave the premiere a negative review, awarding it only two stars. He stated the show had turned into "a run-of-the-mill sitcom" and criticized the writers for not being able to develop material to match the "venerable cast capable of great things." He called the Paul storyline "corny" and the switched-baby storyline "as compelling as a manicure," and commented that both Williams and Brian Austin Greene deliver underwhelming performances. Isabelle Carreau of TV Squad called the episode "a solid season premiere for the series." She was surprised by both the identity of the switched child and its early revelation. Carreau also praised Williams' performance, writing: "The banter between Lynette and Renee was priceless!"
