= Andrew Van de Kamp =

Fictional character in the ABC television series Desperate Housewives

- Desperate Housewives character
- Portrayed by: Shawn Pyfrom
- Duration: 2004–12
- First appearance: "Pilot"; 1x01, October 3, 2004
- Last appearance: "Any Moment"; 8x18, March 25, 2012
- Created by: Marc Cherry
In-universe information
- Occupation: Vice President of Mrs. Van de Kamp's Catering Business; Personal assistant Waiter in Scavo's Pizzeria
- Father: Rex Van de Kamp (deceased)
- Mother: Bree Van de Kamp
- Stepfather: Orson Hodge; Trip Weston
- Sisters: Danielle Van de Kamp
- Half-brothers: Sam Allen
- Husband: Alex Cominis (m. 2013; div. 2015)
- Grandparents: Mrs Mason (deceased); Henry Mason; Eleanor Mason (step); Phyllis Van de Kamp; Mr Van De Kamp (deceased)
- Nephews: Benjamin Katz

Andrew Van de Kamp is a fictional character in the ABC television series Desperate Housewives played by Shawn Pyfrom, and is the son of one of the title characters, Bree Van de Kamp, and her first husband Rex Van de Kamp.

As one of the few LGBT characters on prime time television secure with his sexuality, Andrew's storylines have been well received by gay groups. However, his early attitude toward his mother and various crimes have also garnered criticism.

== Storylines ==
=== Past ===
Andrew Van de Kamp was born in 1988. There were complications at his birth as the umbilical cord wrapped around his neck. A year later, he became brother to Danielle. In 1994, he, his parents and sister moved to 4354 Wisteria Lane in Fairview. He was caught stealing porcelain by his mother from the front yard of 4352 Wisteria Lane and was forced to apologize to the owner, Mary Alice Young, with a slightly shocked Susan Mayer as a witness.

As a teenager, he intended to run for class president. The day before the announcement of the candidacy, he heard from his mother, "Are you sure? You don't have the leader gene." Later, she did not even listen to the speech.

=== Season 1 ===
Andrew first appears in the "Pilot" of season one. His first speaking role is arguing with his mother, Bree, over her desire for perfection. He is attached to his father, Rex, and is upset when Bree tries to cover up their impending divorce. When he confronts her about her lies after she discovers he lied to her, she says, "Just because I chose not to share my marital problems with you does not give you the right to be rude!": and Andrew replies, "How about driving my father away? Do I get to be rude then?", and shuts the door in her face. Andrew repeatedly breaks the rules during Season 1, infuriating Bree, who eventually humiliates him by turning up at the strip club he is visiting with his friends while grounded. Bree does later apologize to Andrew (who also admits how much he misses his father) for lying to him, but removes the door to his room in punishment for him smoking marijuana.

His parents' acrimonious divorce results in Rex buying Andrew a car. Bree tries to get him to give it back but Andrew refuses. Later that episode, he hit Juanita "Mama" Solis with his car while drunk. Mama survived this but was put in a coma, dying later after waking up and falling down stairs. His parents help him cover it up but Andrew doesn't feel any remorse for his crime. He continues to misbehave and Bree gets him dropped from the school swim team for smoking marijuana in an attempt to make him regret his actions. Further angered by her refusal to allow Rex to convalesce from heart surgery at home, Andrew threatens, "You wanna see how long I can hold a grudge? Go ahead and abandon my father because I promise you will be sorry." When he finds out about his father's adultery, however, he apologizes to Bree and is angry with Rex.

When Bree tells Andrew that if he gets his friend Lisa pregnant, he will marry her. Andrew merely laughs as he is actually developing a relationship with Justin, who confesses to Gabrielle Solis that he and Andrew have been "fooling around" for some time. Andrew later crashes Zach's pool party with Justin and some friends and creates mayhem. However, after everyone else has gone home, Susan Mayer catches them naked in the swimming pool kissing; Andrew anxiously shouts, "I'm not, I'm not gay!" Susan then walks away, shocked by what she had just seen. After getting expelled from school for drug abuse and vehicular assault on a school parking attendant, as well as continuing his rudeness towards Bree, Andrew is sent to a juvenile delinquent boot camp.

Andrew stares resentfully at his mother from Camp Hennessey.

Some time later, Bree and Rex visit Andrew at the camp. Andrew asks to see his father alone; Bree thinks this is because he blames her for sending him to the camp and storms into the meeting room to tell him she did the right thing. There, Rex reveals that Andrew wanted to see him alone because he fears he is gay. Bree is horrified, and despite Rex's misgivings, insists Andrew come home with them immediately, saying "Our son just told us that he might be gay. There are two hundred other boys in this camp. Now, I could explain to you what might happen if we left him here, but I'm a lady and I don't use that kind of language." Rex reminds her that he is still her son and Bree tries to comfort Andrew by telling him "I would love you even if you were a murderer".

Bree then invites Reverend Sykes to dinner, who tries to convince Andrew to enroll in Christian counselling. He refuses, saying "I'm not confused. I know exactly who I am." This deeply upsets Bree, who tells him he has to change or he will not be with her in heaven; Andrew is shocked and agrees to meet the reverend. In his final scene of the season, after swearing the reverend to secrecy, Andrew states that, not only does he not believe in God, but that he lied to his parents about being gay to get out of the camp. This confuses the reverend, who asks him whether he is heterosexual or not: Andrew replies, "Look, I love vanilla ice cream, okay? But every now and then I’m probably gonna be in the mood for chocolate." He then says he will get revenge on Bree for rejecting him by pretending to be a model son and then doing something so awful it is "going to really destroy her".

=== Season 2 ===
Set just weeks after Rex's death, Andrew's first opening shot in Season 2 is to claim Bree is incapable of having murdered his father because "it takes guts to kill somebody". He resents George Williams for dating Bree while Rex was still alive, and is very rude to him when he sees him with Bree. Andrew shaved his head after the 1st season. Bree blackmails Andrew with swim club subs into attending dinner with George. In response, Andrew imitates Bree's pleasure moan to provoke George, who tries to send him to his room but will not tell Bree why, and she refuses to punish Andrew without a reason. George decides to get rid of Andrew by kissing his mother during his swim meet, which angers him so much that he jumps out of the pool and attacks George. That evening, Andrew packs his bags for Camp Hennessey a second time.

Andrew tries to provoke Bree as far as possible – including exhibiting his sexuality in front of her.

After George dies, Bree brings Andrew back from the camp, telling him that George killed Rex in order to marry her; Andrew is disgusted that his father is dead because of her. As a result, Andrew invites Justin to sleep over. He confides to him his reasons for hating Bree, saying:

Last year, when she found out that I liked guys, she freaked out. She said that, if I didn't change, I'd be going straight to hell. So, since I knew that I couldn't change, it suddenly hit me that, one day, my own mother was going to stop loving me. So, I decided to stop loving her first. That way, it wouldn't hurt so bad.

He also confides his wish for his mother to slip up so that he can "take her down". Later, Bree confesses to Andrew that George didn't commit suicide; he overdosed and asked her to call an ambulance, but she sat and watched him die. Andrew now has the "slip up" that he was waiting for.

When Bree sees Andrew kissing Justin outside her window, she forbids him from bringing his boyfriend to their home. Andrew mocks her and ensures Bree later walks in them in bed together. Bree threatens to call the police and have Justin forcibly removed, but Andrew replies that he will tell them about what happened to George. This backfires, however, when Bree hires Karl Mayer, a lawyer/friend of the family, who not only explains that Bree has not committed a crime but slams Andrew against a wall and orders him to leave her alone.

Along with his sister, Andrew notices Bree's increasing alcohol consumption, and uses it against her. When Bree refuses to let Andrew access his trust fund to buy a car, he calls her a "mean old drunk", and she slaps him. Andrew emotionally blackmails Justin into punching him in the same place Bree slapped him. He then hires a lawyer to file for emancipation from his mother, whom he accuses of hitting him while drunk. Andrew tries to persuade her in "There Is No Other Way" to just let him go, but she refuses saying she hasn't "set him right" yet. Andrew, after consultation with his lawyer, tells Bree in "Could I Leave You?" that he will accuse her of molesting him if he does not get his way.

Bree's father and stepmother arrive, and convince the judge to drop the case. They try to reconcile the two, but Andrew persuades them to let him live with them. Justin is heartbroken when he finds out, and when Bree asks him why, replies:

When my parents first heard I was gay, they kicked me out. They said I had "debased" the entire family and that they couldn't love me anymore until I had changed. But Andrew said that I should be ashamed of them because they were too stupid to know how great I was. That's the thing about Andrew, he does not take crap from anyone. How can you not love him?

Bree persuades Justin to supply her with gay magazines and videos, which she plants among Andrew's things for his grandparents to find; they then leave Andrew behind, and revoke his trust fund. In an attempt to make peace, Bree invites Justin to dinner.

Andrew, however, doesn't give up hating his mother or trying to hurt her. He discovers that Peter McMillian, Bree's boyfriend, is a sex addict, and tries to persuade his sister Danielle Van de Kamp to seduce him. After she refuses, he lures Peter into bed himself, where Bree finds them. Bree finally gives up and leaves him with a bag of clothes and some money by an abandoned gas station because she can no longer love him unconditionally. In his final scene for the season, Andrew, realizing he really is about to lose his mom, tells her that the only good thing is that he has won. Bree–who had already been hurt and betrayed by Andrew multiple times–decides not to argue with him and simply replies "good for you."

=== Season 3 ===
Orson persuades Andrew to come home. He succeeds where Bree does not.

Eight months after the end of Season 2, Bree is about to leave for her honeymoon with Orson when she sees a news report on television about homeless teenagers, in which Andrew is interviewed. Horrified at what has happened to him, she cancels her honeymoon and sets out to retrieve Andrew, eventually finding him in a soup kitchen; she asks him to come back but he refuses. When she shouts "I'm your mother, for God's sakes, you're my son!", Andrew replies "No, you dumped your son at a gas station seven months ago. I'm somebody else now", and runs. When Orson sees how guilty Bree feels, he finds Andrew himself and buys him lunch. During their conversation, Andrew admits he worked the streets as a rent boy whenever he was desperate for money, and asks Orson not to tell his mother, before realizing what he's said and correcting himself. Orson does not try to force Andrew to come home but instead points out that the reason he is living on the streets is to punish his mother, and ultimately he will only destroy himself. Andrew does not initially appear to heed this, but returns home the next day at the end of "A Weekend In the Country".

Bree is delighted, but insists on concocting a reason for Andrew's long absence. Returning to normal social activities, he is disconcerted to see one of his former clients at a school science fair. Orson is worried for Andrew, which Bree notices and asks him about later that night. Wanting no secrets, Orson confesses that Andrew sold himself for money, and that the man he had been talking to was a previous client. Bree, shocked, and a friend of the man's wife, confesses all to her. She takes it badly, and tells Bree in return that Danielle is sleeping with her history teacher. Later, Andrew watches the tail end of her argument with Danielle and, concerned, he tries to comfort Bree, explaining that she did instill moral values, "I mean, we know the difference between right and wrong, we just chose wrong", but also that she pushed them so hard they had to rebel. Bree tries to subtly get him to talk about his prostitution, but he gently brushes her off. Andrew has since got a job working at Tom's pizzeria, though he takes a fairly lax attitude to his work.

When Andrew overhears the conversation between Bree and Orson about the death of Monique Polier, he believes that it is Orson's fault when his mother suffers a fall from a rigged ladder. Warning Orson that he has never met "bad Andrew", but he will if he harms Bree further, Andrew then tells the nurse that Orson is dangerous and should not be left alone with Bree. Later, Andrew leaves Bree under the care of Danielle who is upset she cannot go to the Scavo's pizzeria. Danielle then decides to leave Bree with Gloria, who unexpectedly shows up with soup. At the pizzeria, Andrew sees Danielle, and she confesses she left Bree with Gloria and he then rushes home. However, in "The Little Things You Do Together", he is knocked out by Gloria Hodge, who actually harmed Bree and intends to kill her. When Andrew wakes up, he discovers that Orson has actually been trying to protect Bree. After this, they make amends once more.

Andrew had no romance this season, though he reveals to Julie Mayer and Danielle that he has tried to seduce Austin McCann, Edie's nephew, and failed. It is Andrew who convinces Austin to leave Fairview after he impregnates Danielle. In the episode "Liaisons" Andrew reveals he is only working at the Scavo's Pizzeria for $8.50 an hour because he is "doing the beer delivery guy."

Andrew is much more protective of his mother this season, with the two having largely repaired their formerly rocky relationship.

=== Season 4 ===
Andrew accidentally leads his grandmother to discover that Bree is not really pregnant. He is there when his sister, Danielle, gives birth to her son.

After Andrew hears his mother talking about how she looks forward to this new chance to finally raise a child correctly, he becomes upset. He decides to move out of his mother's house and get his own apartment. Bree feels guilty and brings food to his house. Andrew tells his mother that he is not angry anymore and has forgiven her, he's moved out to try to turn his life around and stand on his own. Bree and Andrew are finally able to reach a full reconciliation. Andrew then makes Bree use a coaster for her drink, providing a humorous moment between the two as she thinks he is becoming more like her. In the season finale, in a scene set five years in the future, Andrew is in business with Bree, who is now a successful author.

==== Five-year jump ====
Andrew becomes Bree's personal assistant for her catering company and is engaged to a man named Alex Cominis.

=== Season 5 ===
This season Shawn Pyfrom is promoted from "also-starring" to "starring".

Five years later, Andrew is now the personal assistant of his mother, Bree, who, with her new cookbook, is a rising public figure similar to Martha Stewart. He has appeared to have matured and is usually seen alongside his mother wearing a suit. He apparently makes a decent living as he owns a sports car.

Orson Hodge's plastic surgeon, Alex Cominis, is Andrew's fiancé. When Bree discovers that Alex was once in gay porn, she tells Andrew and is surprised to learn that Andrew already knew and did not judge Alex for his past mistakes as he himself has a "sordid past" (referring to the feud between himself and his mother following the death of his father, and his work as a rent boy seven years earlier).

Andrew accuses Bree of being too protective by investigating Alex. She admits to this, and Andrew — to her surprise — is glad. It is then insinuated that Bree has come to accept her son's sexuality and plans on handling the wedding. When Andrew's soon-to-be mother in-law comes to town, in order to out-do her, Bree decides to buy Andrew and Alex the former home of Martha Huber and Felicia Tilman, which is only two houses down and on Wisteria Lane.

=== Season 6 ===
Shawn Pyfrom quit Desperate Housewives and did not return as a series regular. He did, however, continue to make occasional guest appearances.

He first returns in "The God-Why-Don't-You-Love-Me Blues" to visit Julie while she is in the hospital. There he reveals to her mother, Susan Delfino, that she dropped out of Medical School and has been a waitress while figuring out what to do with her life. He also reveals that she has been involved with a married man who turns out to be Angie's husband, Nick.

Andrew appears in a non-speaking cameo, gardening with Bree in "You Gotta Get a Gimmick".

In "The Chase", Bree's new employee Sam Allen (Samuel Page) suggests that Andrew has been sleeping with incompetent employee Tad (Eric Ian Colton). Andrew admits to Sam and his mother that he had a one-time affair with Tad, and defends his actions by stating he had been drinking when Tad came on to him. Bree mentions that Andrew still lives together with Alex, insinuating he is practically committing adultery. Andrew takes this as an opportunity to throw his knowledge of Bree's own affair with Karl Mayer in her face. It becomes clear that Andrew and Sam do not like each other, and that Sam's place with the company will be a source of conflict between Andrew and Bree. Sam soon reveals that he is Rex's son and Bree welcomes him into the family. Andrew isn't happy with his presence and he and Orson are both suspicious of Sam's true intentions and decide to investigate. Bree soon realizes Sam is emotionally unstable and tries to fire him. However, Sam has discovered (via a drunken Danielle) how Andrew killed Carlos' mother and blackmails her into signing over the company to him. Orson, who had been unaware of Andrew's crime, is upset at Bree covering for her son while demanding Orson turn himself in for his hit-and-run of Mike and leaves Bree. Realizing Orson is right, Bree tells Andrew she has to tell Gabrielle the truth.

=== Season 7 ===
Bree reveals the truth about Mama Solis's death to Gabrielle in "Remember Paul?", and they agree not to tell Carlos for the sake of Andrew's safety and the Solis marriage (Andrew does not appear in this episode). In "You Must Meet My Wife", Bree accidentally hits Juanita Solis with her car, Bree and Andrew go to the hospital to make sure Juanita is fine. There, Andrew thanks Gaby for not telling Carlos, but she yells at both him and Bree for trying to run down her whole family. Later on, she forgives them both.

Andrew next appears in "Down the Block There's a Riot". Lynette knocks on Andrew's door to make sure Andrew has no intention of selling his house to Paul Young. Andrew acts insulted, and asks "do you really think I would do that to my mother?", to which Lynette replies "I don't know, you were pretty nasty as a teenager". Andrew is also seen at the homeowners' meeting, and during the riot.

In "Everything's Different, Nothing's Changed", Bree fears Andrew is showing signs of alcoholism and it is revealed by Alex that Andrew has indeed been drinking every day. Bree later confronts Andrew about his addiction and learns that Alex has left him over it. Bree convinces Andrew to attend AA and allow her to help him, by talking to each other.

In "Moments in the Woods", Andrew is seeking to make amends, and decides to tell Carlos about running over his mother, over Bree's objections. When Carlos invites Andrew on a camping trip, Bree and Gabrielle fear the worst and follow them. Finding Carlos with a bloody towel and a dirty shovel, Bree jumps to conclusions and blurts out what Andrew did, just as her son enters the cabin. Carlos is outraged at Andrew and Bree for hiding this, and tries to force Andrew to drink to Mama Solis's memory. Carlos leaves the cabin and the trio track him down to his mother's grave. When Bree tries to take responsibility for Andrew's condition, he tells her it's time he finally stood up for his own mistakes. He and Carlos talk and Carlos is able to forgive him for a teenage mistake (although he does blame Bree for hiding it all this time).

=== Season 8 ===
Andrew returns home and surprises Bree by revealing he's engaged to a woman named Mary Beth. When she learns the woman is an heiress, Bree believes Andrew is just marrying her for her money. She arranges an "engagement party" with several of Andrew's gay friends. Mary Beth reveals that she knows Andrew is gay but has been unlucky in love so is willing to be with him. Bree encourages her to find a man to truly love her, however, and she breaks up with Andrew. He's upset as he had lost his job and has massive debt but Bree convinces him to stay with her and let her help him get back on his feet.

== Characterization ==
Andrew is partially based on writer Marc Cherry himself, who copied much of Bree's dialogue from his own mother's reaction when he came out to her. Andrew can be selfish and manipulative, and regularly uses other people to get what he wants, for example, persuading his boyfriend Justin to hit him so he can claim Bree is abusing him. He has also committed a range of crimes, from being expelled from school for smoking marijuana, to running over Mamá Solis while drunk. After Bree hushed up the accident for him, he then refused to feel bad, reasoning "She's an old lady! I have my whole life ahead of me!" Marc Cherry has referred to him as being sociopathic. In Season 3, however, Andrew seems to have matured after spending eight months living on the streets.

While fans have heatedly debated his sexual orientation, Shawn Pyfrom has denied that Andrew is totally homosexual, implying he is bisexual. When asked whether Andrew was specifically gay or bisexual, Pyfrom stated "I really don’t even know at this point. I mean, he did make that statement [that’s he’s bisexual]. I think he’s a little more gay than he is straight, though." In "My Husband, the Pig", he refers to Austin as a "dog" and himself as a "dog-lover". Whatever Andrew is, he is one of a few LGBT teens on television secure with his sexuality. Marc Cherry has commented, "Andrew Van de Kamp is perhaps the most empowered gay teen in the history of television. He's gay and he doesn't care."

From Andrew's hurt reaction to his mother's rejection of him, it appears that he deeply loves his mother, as his determination to hurt her in Season 2 is so he can "stop loving her first". He also loves and respects his father, and only Rex who can get him to stop tormenting Bree in Season 1, albeit briefly. Later on in Season 2, Karl, another strong male figure, has some similar success in forcing Andrew to stop harassing Bree temporarily. In Season 3, it is Orson, and not Bree, who persuades Andrew to return home and whom he continues to respect throughout the season.

Andrew is very protective of his mother, as is shown in Season 2 when he attacks George after George tries to kiss Bree against her will, and then in Season 3 where he threatens Orson under the belief that Orson may hurt Bree. By the fifth season, a more mature Andrew has inherited traits that he once ridiculed his mother for having, such as blunt sarcasm. His relationship with his mother has also changed dramatically for the better.

== Critical reception ==
As Andrew is a minor character in Desperate Housewives, he is rarely mentioned by critics. However, his storylines have occasionally attracted press coverage. In 2005, when Andrew kissed character Justin while engaging in late night foreplay in a pool in the episode "Impossible", gay groups applauded a primetime television show willing to show a romantic gay kiss; only six network television shows had done so in the past twenty years, as opposed to thirty for lesbian kisses. Despite the fact that some Christian groups had protested Desperate Housewives before it had even aired, few prominent leaders said anything about the kiss.

Shawn Pyfrom has stated that he has received many letters from gay teens who have been encouraged by Andrew's ease with his sexuality as one of the few secure and confident LGBT teenage characters on television. Marc Cherry has expressed bemusement at this, saying, "to young people, Andrew is something of a role model which is a little appalling to me because he's something of a sociopath!" However, Pyfrom commented that he saw this as a good thing:

I think what's great about Andrew is that they developed him as this bastard teenager who is terrible to his mother, hits old ladies with his car, and also happens to be gay. They don't make him this typical weak gay character, and I think that's good because it's saying that even if you're gay, you can still be strong and confident.

Andrew's relentless torment of his mother and other devious exploits have been negatively received by critics, with one declaring him a "Class-A jerk". The Parent's Television Council named "I Know Things Now" as their "Worst Episode of the Week", in part due to Andrew's seduction of Bree's boyfriend. However, his improved behavior and deep love for his mother in Season 3 has also disappointed some critics, with one saying "if he has any lines at all, he's a little angel...as if he's become something of a Stepford son!"
