= Julie Mayer (Desperate Housewives) =

Fictional character on Desperate Housewives

- Desperate Housewives character
- Portrayed by: Andrea Bowen
- Duration: 2004–2012
- First appearance: "Pilot"; 1x01, October 3, 2004
- Last appearance: "Finishing the Hat"; 8x23, May 13, 2012
- Created by: Marc Cherry
In-universe information
- Occupation: Doctoral Candidate; Former; Tutor; Medical Student; Waitress
- Father: Karl Mayer (deceased)
- Mother: Susan Mayer
- Stepfather: Mike Delfino (deceased)
- Siblings: M.J. Delfino (maternal half-brother); Evan Mayer (paternal half-brother)
- Children: Sophie Mayer-Scavo (with Porter Scavo)
- Other relatives: Sophie Bremmer (maternal grandmother); Morty Flickman (maternal step-grandfather); Addison Prudy (maternal grandfather); Carol Prudy (maternal step-grandmother); Irene Mayer (paternal great-grandmother); Claire Bremmer (great-aunt); Tim Bremmer (great-cousin); Nick Delfino (step-grandfather); Adele Delfino (step-grandmother)

Julie Alexandra Mayer is a fictional character on the ABC television series Desperate Housewives. The character is played by actress Andrea Bowen, and first appeared in the pilot episode of the series in 2004. She is the daughter of Susan Delfino (Teri Hatcher) and Karl Mayer (Richard Burgi). They share custody of Julie, though she lives primarily with Susan. Julie is characterized as "bright and self-sufficient and extremely mature for her age." She often acts as the parental figure in her relationship with Susan, especially following Susan's divorce from Karl. However, starting in the 6th season, Julie's personality changed quite a bit, with her saying she was no longer the "perfect" daughter.

== Development and casting ==
Prior to being cast in the role, Bowen did not think she would get it, explaining, "they were looking for a 12-year-old brunette ... and I was a 13-year-old blonde." As a result, Bowen was asked to dye her hair for the role. Bowen was initially attracted to the series because of the amount of attention paid to the younger characters. She stated, "If you watch a lot of other television shows, the kids don't have that much [of a] part in it. On this show, the writers give us each our own individual storylines that have a lot of layers to them." For the show's third season, the character's storylines began revolving around themes of teenage rebellion and angst. Bowen commented: "She's going to have, you know, primarily one love interest, and he's a bit of a bad boy. We’re going to see if she has a positive effect on him, or if he has a negative effect on her. I'm definitely very excited about it ... because you kind of get to see a different side to her."

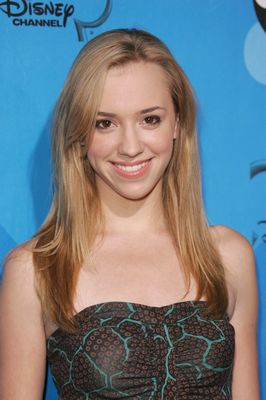
Andrea Bowen (pictured) portrayed Julie, daughter of Susan Delfino (Teri Hatcher).

At the beginning of the series' fourth season, Bowen commented on the possibility that her character would be leaving the show for college, stating that the writers had briefly alluded to the character's departure early in the season but removed it from the script. She continued: "Do I want my character to go off to college? No, I'm very happy where I am but I wouldn't be too devastated if it happened because none of us feel too secure with their jobs being that people get killed left and right. I think we all live with the suspicion that we're going to be going." The Julie character was written off the series for the fifth season. Hatcher expressed disappointment in the decision, but series creator Marc Cherry promised that Bowen would return to the series. Bowen returned to the series for one episode during season five and rejoined the main cast as a series regular for the sixth season. She appeared once in the seventh season and returned for a string of episodes in the show's eighth and final season.

== Storylines ==
=== Season 1 ===
Julie usually helps Susan deal with problems regarding Susan's love life, and helps to care for her mother after her divorce. She is briefly romantically involved with Zach Young (Cody Kasch), the troubled son of Susan's friend, Mary Alice (Brenda Strong). She harbors Zach in her room when he escapes from the mental institution Paul has sent him to. Susan eventually finds Zach and sends him home, which Julie considers an act of betrayal. Eventually, Susan bans Zach from seeing Julie due to his increasingly disturbing behavior, but they continue dating in secrecy. Soon after, Julie breaks up with Zach because of his sadistic mentality.

=== Season 2 ===
During the second season, Julie expresses concern over Susan's remarriage to her father Karl, but agrees to it because she wants Susan to have her surgery to remove her wandering spleen. Julie recognizes that Zach has changed and rekindles their romance. As an act of kindness towards Zach and Mike Delfino (James Denton), she invites Zach bowling with them, to try to help Mike and Zach bond. Their friendship is ruined when Zach's father, Paul Young (Mark Moses), forbids him from speaking to Julie, fearing he will discover Mike is his biological father.

Julie catches Susan in bed with Karl, and she is forced to sleep in a small van with Susan when their house is burned down by Edie Britt (Nicollette Sheridan). Karl buys them a new house, but Susan refuses, eventually moving back to their house in season 3.

=== Season 3 ===
In the beginning of the third season, Julie meets Edie's nephew, Austin McCann (Josh Henderson), whom she likes but does not want to admit it. Edie soon tells Julie that Austin is bad news and that she should not get attached.

After the two of them, plus Edie and Lynette, are held hostage by Carolyn Bigsby (Laurie Metcalf) in a supermarket, they begin dating. Julie loses her virginity to Austin, realizing that the relationship has to move forward if she wants to keep dating him. Unfortunately, her mother and Edie catch Austin having sex with Danielle Van de Kamp (Joy Lauren). Susan informs Julie about this, and she decides to break up with him. Eventually Julie agrees to give him a second chance, but when Danielle learns that she is pregnant with his child, Orson Hodge (Kyle MacLachlan) insists Austin leave town.

=== Season 4 ===
In the fourth season premiere, Julie is reunited with her childhood best friend, Dylan Mayfair (Lyndsy Fonseca), when Dylan and her family return to the street after twelve years of being absent. However Dylan does not remember Julie or ever living on Wisteria Lane. Julie becomes suspicious of Dylan. Julie tells Susan that Dylan is not the same girl as she was years ago when they were best friends. It is revealed that Julie is right, as the real Dylan had been crushed to death by a wardrobe and buried just before Katherine Mayfair (Dana Delany) left Fairview.

Julie also adjusts to having Mike as her stepfather.

When Julie begins dating a questionable boy named Derek, who has many piercings, Susan tries to fix her up with a young man who turns up at the house looking for Mike. However, Susan quickly breaks the relationship up when she finds out that the young man is in fact Mike's drug dealer.

In the fourth-season finale, Julie is accepted to Princeton University. One of the professors is so impressed by her senior thesis that she is offered a summer internship, and she leaves to attend college.

=== Season 5 ===
After the five-year time jump, Julie reappears in the episode "City on Fire" and introduces Susan to her boyfriend, her college professor, Lloyd (Steven Weber), a 40-year-old man who has been married 3 times. Lloyd proposes to Julie but she rejects him, stating that she does not believe in marriage, following her mother's string of bad luck. Susan explains to Julie how much she believes in marriage and the two share a hug.

=== Season 6 ===
Julie returns to Wisteria Lane for the summer to help her mother with her upcoming wedding. During this time, she forms a relationship with Danny Bolen (Beau Mirchoff), who has moved in across the street with his parents. The relationship is turbulent and short-lived. When Julie is strangled outside her house and ends up comatose, Danny is the prime suspect. As the other characters work to reveal the identity of Julie's attacker, an affair she was having with Danny's father, Nick (Jeffrey Nordling), and a pregnancy scare prior to the attack are exposed. Several months after waking up from her coma, Julie decides to visit relatives on the East Coast until her attacker is caught. In the episode "Epiphany", Julie's attacker is revealed to be Eddie Orlofsky (Josh Zuckerman), who attacked her mistaking her for Susan.

=== Season 7 ===
Julie is not seen again until the seventh season episode "Where Do I Belong" when she visits Susan in the hospital after her kidney has been removed. She offers to donate her kidney to Susan, but she is not a match.

=== Season 8 ===
Julie, who is working toward a Ph.D., reveals that she is six months pregnant. She plans to give her daughter up for adoption, hoping to spare herself and her child the drama that she experienced while being raised by a single mother. Later, Susan learns that the baby's father is Porter Scavo (Charlie Carver), son of her friend Lynette (Felicity Huffman). Despite Julie's insistence, Porter refuses to let her put their daughter up for adoption, planning to raise her himself. Eventually, Julie decides to keep the baby. Julie's baby is born in the same day of Renee Perry's wedding and Karen McCluskey's death, in the series finale.

== Reception ==
Bowen's performance throughout the course of the series has received mixed reviews. Entertainment Weekly's Annie Barrett identified Julie as a TV character she irrationally hates. She criticized the character as being one-note and inconsequential and opined that Bowen "started off the series in an awkward phase and then we realized the awkward phase was going to last her entire life." Following the announcement that Bowen would be rejoining the cast for the sixth season, Michael Slezak of Entertainment Weekly wrote that Bowen's performance is "so deeply unconvincing [that she risks] getting upstaged if there's so much as a house plant in a scene with [her]." He also criticized the performances of other young actresses on the series and raised the question, "how come Desperate Housewives has such a dreadful track record with younger actresses?" Following the character's attack in the sixth-season premiere, Entertainment Weekly's Tanner Stransky wrote: "What I love about having Julie in peril in the first episode is that it's shocking and totally unexpected. She's a big enough character that I care about her and know a decent amount about her, but it's not like [a more important character] was knocked off the show."
