= Cody Kasch =

American actor (born 1987)

- Born: Cody Reed Kasch; August 21, 1987 (age 38); Santa Monica, California, U.S.
- Occupation: Actor
- Years active: 1989–present

Cody Reed Kasch (born August 21, 1987) is an American actor. He is known for his role of Zach Young on the ABC comedy-drama series Desperate Housewives.

== Early life ==
Kasch was born in Santa Monica, California. He is of Scottish descent. He was raised in Ojai, California on a working ranch until the age of 13, when he moved to Camarillo, California. Both of Kasch's parents were actively involved in the arts. His father was an actor and writer of locally premiering plays, and his mother was a director and photographer. As his older brother, actor Max Kasch, began to experience success, the brothers competed for jobs; their success caused the entire Kasch family to leave Ojai and move to the more favorably located Camarillo.

== Career ==
After numerous television guest appearances, Kasch got his first major role when he was cast in a regular role on the sitcom Normal, Ohio, only for the series to be cancelled after a few episodes. Kasch portrayed a Texan high school student in the Noggin comedy-drama series Out There. He played Zach Young, the son of deceased Mary Alice Young, on the ABC comedy-drama series Desperate Housewives. After a brief absence from the series, he returned in the third season as Gabrielle Solis' secret admirer and seventh season. He is also the narrator for several audiobooks. He starred in the 2010 horror film Chain Letter.

== Filmography ==
Film
Year	Title	Role	Notes
1989	Behind God's Back	Buda's boy	Short film
2005	Homefront	Jake	Short film
2008	Asylum	String	
2009	The 2 Bobs	Doofus	
2010	Chain Letter	Neil Conners	
2011	The Encore of Tony Duran	Michael Duran	
2012	The First Five	Jack	
2014	The 420 Movie: Mary & Jane	Curt	
2015	The Last Rescue	Pvt. James Lewis	
2015	Oro y Polvo	Jerry	
2017	L.A. Player	Marvin Lovejoy	Short film
2019	Narco Soldiers	Jerry	
2020	The 420 Movie: Mary & Jane	Curt	
2021	Hollywood.com	Marvin Lovejoy	

Television
Year	Title	Role	Notes
1999	Martial Law	Kid	Episode: "Sammo Claus"
2000	E.R.	Jason Bender	Episode: "Family Matters"
2000	The Others	Wounded boy	Episode: "Luciferous"
2000	Nash Bridges	—N/a	Episode: "Heist"
2000	The Practice	Scott Simpson Jr.	Episode: "Death Penalties"
2000	Any Day Now	Brian	Episode: "Love Is Love"
2000	Normal, Ohio	Robert "Robbie" Miller	7 episodes
2002	Boston Public	Austin Cooper	Episode: "Chapter Thirty-Five"
2002	NYPD Blue	Josh Stover	Episode: "Better Laid Than Never (Part I)"
2003	Family Affair	Devin	Episode: "Miss Turnstiles"
2003	Boomtown	Trevor "TJ" Jankowski, Jr.	Episode: "Haystack"
2004	Out There	Tom Butler	
2004	Phil of the Future	Troy	Episode: "Future Jock"
2004–2007, 2011	Desperate Housewives	Zach Young	Seasons 1–3, 7; 54 episodes
2005	Law & Order: Special Victims Unit	Kyle Ackerman	Episode: "Raw"
2007	Side Order of Life	Max Kalen	Episode: "Early Bird Catches the Word"
2008	Criminal Minds	Owen Savage	Episode: "Elephant's Memory"
2009	CSI: Crime Scene Investigation	Thommy Baker	Episode: "Death and the Maiden"
2009	It's Always Sunny in Philadelphia	Cheesefoot	Episode: "The Gang Reignites the Rivalry"

== Awards and nominations ==
Year	Award	Category	Work	Result
2005	Screen Actors Guild Award	Outstanding Performance by an Ensemble in a Comedy Series	Desperate Housewives	Won
2005	Young Artist Award	Best Performance in a TV Series (Comedy or Drama) – Supporting Young Actor	Desperate Housewives	Nominated
