= Paul Young (Desperate Housewives) =

Fictional character on Desperate Housewives

- Desperate Housewives character
- Portrayed by: Mark Moses
- Duration: 2004–2007, 2010–2011
- First appearance: "Pilot"; 1x01, October 3, 2004
- Last appearance: "Making the Connection"; 8x02, October 2, 2011
- Created by: Marc Cherry
In-universe information
- Other names: Todd Forrest (birth name)
- Occupation: Prison inmate Former; Businessman
- Wife: Mary Alice Young (m. 1988; died 2004); Beth Young (m. 2014; died 2016)
- Adoptive sons: Zach Young

Paul Young is a fictional character on ABC television series Desperate Housewives. The character is played by actor Mark Moses, and is the widower of Mary Alice Young, the show's narrator. After leaving the show in the third season, Paul returned in the sixth season's finale and becomes a regular again in the seventh season, in which he is the center of the yearly mystery.

== Development and casting ==
Mark Moses was part of the original cast of the series, and continued his starring role throughout the second season of the series. After his character is imprisoned in the second-season finale, Moses left the main cast, but still made some guest appearances in the third season.

Moses returned to the series as a series regular after appearing briefly in the sixth-season finale. On his return, Moses commented, "There was some talk about [me coming back] a year ago. And there's often talk in Hollywood. Sometimes it pans out, sometimes it doesn't. I don't get super-excited about a 'maybe' in this town, because there are lots of maybes that don't happen. But then this last year they called up my agent and said, 'We're really thinking seriously about [this].' And eventually, they made an offer, and I was very pleased." After his character's mystery ended in episode "And Lots of Security...", Moses left again the main cast and only made one last guest appearance in the eighth and final season of the series.

== Storylines ==
=== Season 1 ===
In 1993 (as mentioned in Season 1, Episode 14 "Love is in the Air"), Paul helps Mary Alice dispose of Deirdre Taylor's body after she accidentally killed her.

After Mary Alice's suicide, her friends find a threatening note in her belongings and give it to Paul. He discovers his neighbor, Martha Huber was responsible and confronts her, asking why she sent it; but Martha shows no remorse, saying "Mary Alice was a horrible person". This enrages Paul, and he kills her. Paul buries her body and tries framing Mike Delfino. However, Martha's sister, Felicia Tilman, recognizes Mary Alice, revealing that Paul and Mary Alice's real names are Todd and Angela Forrest. She worked with Mary Alice in Utah and knows they snatched Deirdre's son, Dana Taylor, now known as Zach Young. The police find Deirdre's remains and start asking questions. Susan Mayer suspects Paul of Martha's murder and Felicia threatens him with Martha's journal if he doesn't leave. She gives Paul copies of Martha's journal and gives Mike the originals. Paul leaves, but Zach stays with Felicia. Later, Felicia asks Mike to murder Paul, knowing that Mike once had a relationship with Deirdre. Zach doesn't want to stay with Felicia; and, when she tells him about Paul leaving, he attacks her. Mike kidnaps Paul and takes him to an abandoned calcium mine, intending to kill him, but lets Paul go upon learning that he himself, rather than Paul, is Zach's father. Mike leaves him and returns home.

=== Season 2 ===
Paul returns home and Mary Alice's friends call the police on Paul on suspicion of Martha's murder. Felicia, however, is still intent on making Paul pay for her sister's death. Felicia plans to inform Deirdre's father Noah Taylor about Paul's involvement in her death, hoping Noah would take justice into his own hands. Her plan fails, however, when Zach Young blackmails Noah into sparing Paul. Felicia moves back to Wisteria Lane and begins terrorizing Paul, using various antics like greasing his front steps with shortening and replacing the lighter fluid for his grill with gasoline. After Paul attacks her in front of witnesses in response to her calling an exterminator to fumigate his house, she seizes her chance and fakes her own murder by spilling large quantities of her own blood in his kitchen as well as cutting off two fingers on her left hand and leaving them in the trunk of his car. Paul is arrested and subsequently abandoned by Zach, who has inherited his grandfather's fortune and realized Paul was responsible for Martha's death.

=== Season 3 ===
Paul makes a brief appearance when Mike encounters him in prison after being arrested on suspicion of involvement in the death of Monique Pollier. Paul, whom Mike has no memory of, tells Mike that he believes him when he says he is innocent, but nonetheless pays two inmates to attack him so he can "rescue" him and gain his trust. As a favor, Paul asks Mike to get Zach to visit him in prison. Zach agrees to visit Paul but refuses to help him locate Felicia, who has gone into hiding in a remote mountain cabin under Martha's name.

=== Season 6 ===
In the episode "I Guess This Is Goodbye" Paul returns to Wisteria Lane in the final moments of season six in a black Lincoln Town Car, renting Susan and Mike's house. When Lee McDermott tells him about how nice the neighbors in Wisteria Lane are, Paul responds by saying, "Oh, I know the neighborhood very well. The truth is: I used to live here." Lee says that everyone would be excited to see that he has moved back. Paul says, "They absolutely will."

=== Season 7 ===
Paul has been released from jail because Felicia's deception was discovered after she was pulled over for speeding and driving without any identification. Paul has also received a large settlement for wrongful incarceration. His return to the Lane is met with surprise by the neighbors who feel guilty about not believing him. He visits Felicia in jail, confirming her suspicion that he murdered her sister. He tells Lee he wants to buy his old house and seems intent on buying other houses on the Lane, threatening Karen McCluskey and blackmailing Susan to convince Mike to sell their house after discovering her internet job. Mary Alice's narration states that Paul's plan is to turn the residents of Wisteria Lane on each other and "it would work."

Paul reveals that he married a woman named Beth while he was in prison. However, Beth appears unsure of being with Paul now that he is free, admitting she doesn't want to share their bed as she's a virgin. They eventually consummate their marriage but Beth is worried about Paul's secrets. When Paul's former cellmate moves on to the Lane, Beth blackmails him into revealing Paul's plan. She confronts him, telling him she knows but is supportive of him, claiming to understand wanting revenge. What Paul does not know is that Beth is Felicia's daughter, aiding her mother in her plan for revenge on Paul.

In the episode "Pleasant Little Kingdom", the residents of Wisteria Lane see a sign announcing that a halfway house for former prisoners will locate in the neighborhood. At a neighborhood meeting to stop this plan, Paul reveals that he has bought several houses in the neighborhood, and intends to buy more, to control the vote on whether the facility should locate there. Paul claims that he wants other prisoners to experience the warmth such a neighborhood offers, which may keep them from returning to prison. In reality, he seems pleased to watch the neighbors bickering. He tells everyone he owns enough houses to open his center and that the mayor will be giving him a special award for it. In the episode "Down the Block There's a Riot", Lynette Scavo organizes a protest with aid from neighboring communities but it turns into a riot, causing mass fighting and destruction on the Lane. Paul always knew this would happen and planned it. When Lynette tries to blame the riot on him, Paul asks her "What makes them better than a bunch of ex-cons?" Later that night, as Paul walks around the Lane celebrating his triumph, he is shot by an unknown assailant.

Questioned by detectives in the hospital, Paul is stunned to learn that Beth is Felicia's daughter but hides it, insisting he and Felicia are on good terms. Checking out of the hospital, Paul plans a cabin getaway with Beth, the implication being he plans to kill her there. Before they leave, the detectives return to show the gun they suspect of having been used to shoot Paul. Paul recognizes it as the gun Mary Alice used to kill herself but keeps quiet. He cancels the trip and is seen staring at a photo of Zach, realizing his son is somehow involved.

Paul tries to track Zach down, discovering the young man has lost his fortune. Paul goes to Mike, stating how he believes Zach shot him and wants to see him. Mike locates Zach at a run-down motel where the boy is strung out on drugs, confessing to shooting Paul. Mike tells Paul where Zach is, saying that whatever Paul plans to do, it can't be worse than what Zach is doing to himself and the two confront Zach. In the episode "Farewell Letter", Paul, upset by his encounter with Zach, confronts Beth as to why she brought a gun into his house. Beth insists that it was only for protection, asking Paul to move past all his recent troubles. He tells her that betrayal means that it is impossible for life to be good again. At the drug rehab facility, Zach blames Paul for all of his problems in life, including Mary Alice's suicide. He tells Paul that he is evil, and that no one could ever love him. This prompts Paul to tell Beth that he knows about her true identity and, although she begs for forgiveness and tells him that she truly loves him, he kicks her out of his house, telling her that no one could ever love him. Beth tries to get back with Paul, brushing the fight as nothing serious. Paul believes this is part of Felicia's game with Beth replying she no longer believes her mother's claims of Paul killing her aunt. Paul then reveals that he did indeed murder Martha, horrifying Beth. At the end of the episode, Beth commits suicide at the hospital, the same way Mary Alice did twelve years ago.

Paul is jarred at Beth's suicide and as she is brain dead but on life support, he refuses to let her go and let Susan have her kidney. Felicia meets Paul in prison, telling him that Beth truly loved him and that their feud has cost them both the life of someone special. Paul tells Susan he is turning off Beth's life support and letting Susan have the kidney. When Susan tells him how sorry she is, Paul breaks into tears. Felicia is released from jail, and decides to get revenge on Paul. They go to a lake to scatter Beth's ashes, Paul bringing a gun with for protection. Felicia takes it from him and holds it on him but then throws it away, saying they have to let go of the hate. They scatter the ashes but it is revealed they were fake, Felicia keeping the real ones and promising a more satisfying revenge on Paul.

Felicia kidnaps Paul and hooks him up to a drip full of antifreeze and has a syringe of potassium chloride threatening to kill him instantly if he screams when she takes the duct tape off. Felicia says she wants him to feel remorse for murdering Martha, but Paul confesses, unaware that Felicia video taped everything. Susan, who is moving back home and wants to surprise M.J. Delfino by putting his favorite things in his room, walks in on Felicia and tricks her into leaving after calling the cops. Felicia comes back and tries to murder Susan with the potassium chloride syringe but Paul breaks free and strangles Felicia in the same way he killed Martha, but Susan talks him out of it. Felicia flees and dies when her car is hit by a semi-truck. Paul decides that if he is ever to redeem himself, he must atone for Martha's murder. He confesses to the police about Martha's murder, and is arrested.

=== Season 8 ===
In the second episode of season 8,"Making the Connection", Bree Van de Kamp visits Paul in prison, prompted by a threatening note she received which is identical to the one sent to Mary Alice Young in the pilot that led to her suicide. Paul denies any prior knowledge of the note or who could have sent it, becoming angry that she would suspect him of capitalizing on his first wife's suicide. He then advises her not to keep it to herself, suggesting that if Mary Alice had told her friends her secret like she had intended, she may not have killed herself. Later, Paul phones Bree when he remembers the name of the cop who he confessed the story about Mary Alice and Martha's letter to on the night he was arrested: Chuck Vance.

== Reception ==
While reviewing the seventh-season premiere Neal Justin of the Star Tribune said, "the premiere is packed with the zippy zingers that made us fall in love with the dramedy in the first place," accrediting the series' improved quality over season six to the return of Moses as Paul. John Griffiths of Us Weekly called the Paul storyline "corny".
