= Mary Alice Young =

Fictional character from the television series Desperate Housewives

- Desperate Housewives character
- Portrayed by: Brenda Strong
- Duration: 2004–12
- First appearance: "Pilot"; 1x01, October 3, 2004
- Last appearance: "Finishing the Hat"; 8x23, May 13, 2012
- Created by: Marc Cherry
In-universe information
- Other names: Angela Forrest
- Occupation: President of the Homeowners Association; Housewife; Nurse
- Husband: Paul Young (m. 1988)
- Adoptive sons: Zach Young

Mary Alice Young (previously Angela Forrest) is a fictional character from the ABC television series Desperate Housewives. The character was created by television producer and screenwriter Marc Cherry and is portrayed by Brenda Strong, who also serves as the narrator of the series from beyond the grave; the character's suicide in the pilot episode served as the catalyst of the series. The narration provided by Mary Alice is essential to the tale of Wisteria Lane, as the series revolves around her sharing the secrets of her friends and neighbors. Her narration technique is akin in style to Edgar Lee Masters's Spoon River Anthology (1915).

Mary Alice is considered the most mysterious of the housewives as only parts of her story are originally known. A loving, doting wife and mother who was generous to her family and neighbors, she was the last person any of them expected to kill herself. In death, Mary Alice sees things she would not have seen when she was alive: her friends' vulnerabilities, lies, and secrets. She does not judge them so much as love them more because of their foibles, pitying them for the ways they manipulate and hurt those they care about most.

Although deceased since the pilot episode, Mary Alice continued to have a leading storyline throughout the first and second seasons of the series, with the story being led by her husband Paul Young (Mark Moses) and son Zach (Cody Kasch). Thereafter, Strong continued to make sporadic appearances as Mary Alice in flashbacks, dreams and as a ghost to other characters while narrating almost every episode of the series. Strong was the subject of acclaim for both her portrayal and narration as the character, with some critics describing her voice as one of the most recognizable on television at the end of the series. She was nominated for two Primetime Emmy Awards for Outstanding Voice-Over Performance for her narration as Mary Alice and received two Screen Actors Guild Awards as a cast member of Desperate Housewives.

== Casting and development ==
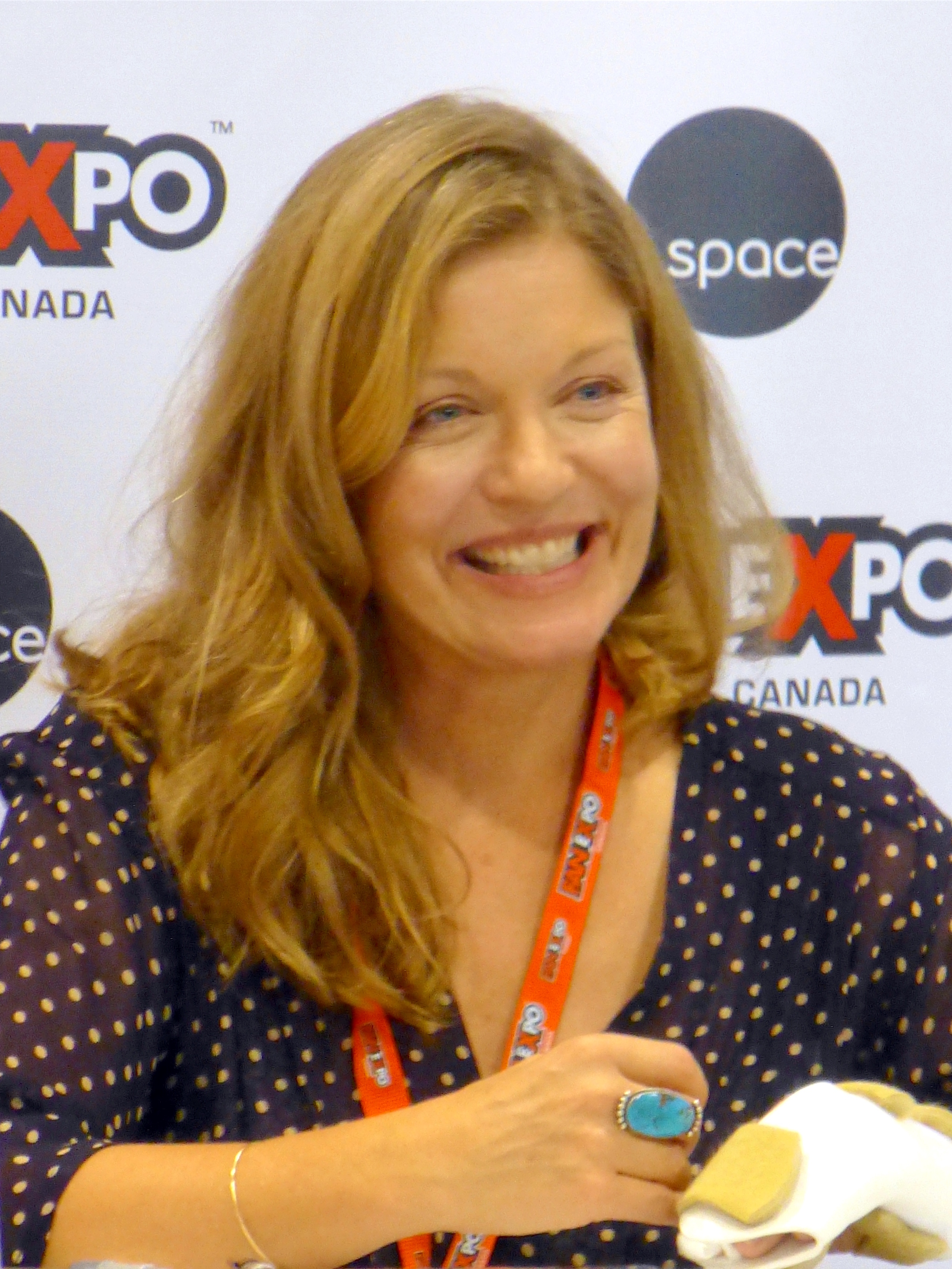
Sheryl Lee portrayed Mary Alice in the series' original pilot for ABC but was replaced soon after, when the producers decided she was not right for the part.

In Marc Cherry's first script for the pilot of Desperate Housewives, the character was originally named Mary Alice Scott, but he was later forced to change the character's surname when the series was picked up by ABC. In the book Desperate Housewives: Behind Closed Doors, a companion to the first season of the series, he explained: "We changed Mary Alice Scott to Mary Alice Young because we couldn't get the name cleared with our lawyers. If over three people in the country have that name you're fine but with anything less than that, they make you use a different name. Apparently there was one Mary Alice Scott in the country." The role of Mary Alice was originally given to Sheryl Lee, who portrayed the character in the original pilot that was filmed for ABC, but Lee was soon replaced by Strong after Cherry and the producers decided that Lee was not right for the part. Marcia Cross, who would later be cast as Bree Van de Kamp, also expressed interest in Mary Alice, but after reading for the part Cherry insisted that she read for Bree instead.

Strong explained in Desperate Housewives: Behind Closed Doors that she believed there to be a "conceptual shift" after the filming of the original pilot with Lee, and "they realized they needed something different", stating: "There certainly wasn't something wrong with what [Lee] did. It was just that instead of vanilla they wanted chocolate, and I happened to be chocolate. When I walked in to audition, Marc Cherry was so sweet. He said, 'I hope you don't mind, but I'm going to close my eyes, because I really want to hear how you sound.' When I was done with the audition, he opened his eyes and this angelic smile crept across his face, and I thought, 'Oh, good. Something went right.'" The actress also explained that she watched the pilot filmed with Lee and while that was helpful for her own portrayal, she saw that what she had to offer for the role was different, saying: "It's a little strange when you watch someone else in a role you're auditioning for because his or her performance lives in your mind. It can be hard to distinguish yourself sometimes, but I had fun with it." Scenes featuring Lee were refilmed with Strong as her replacement. Strong stated years later that her role and narration as Mary Alice led to her voice becoming significantly recognizable, explaining in a 2012 interview with Entertainment Weekly that fans of the series would recognize her in coffee shops solely by her voice. The actress served as the narrator of almost every episode of the series, with the exceptions of the third season episode "My Husband, the Pig" (in which Steven Culp narrates the episode as the deceased Rex Van de Kamp) and the fifth season episode "Look Into Their Eyes and You See What They Know" (in which Nicollette Sheridan narrates the episode as the deceased Edie Britt).

"It's kind of like when you knit a sweater and you pull one thread and the entire thing unravels. I think Mary Alice was the thread that started to unravel the rest of them and it continues to unravel. I think really it's about getting to the very tapestry of everyone's story, everyone's shadow, everyone's deepest fear and I think in some ways, dealing with the world and what we're up against, it's not that dissimilar to how people are feeling about their own lives."

— Strong describing the way Mary Alice's storyline influenced the remainder of the series (2011)

The mystery surrounding Mary Alice and her family was the main storyline in the first season of the series, and it is resolved in the first-season finale. Cherry had wanted there to be a "definite end" to the mystery, hoping to avoid similar viewer fatigue that Twin Peaks suffered after drawing out its central mystery past its first season. ABC executives initially protested the writers' decision to have Mary Alice purposefully kill Deirdre Taylor (Jolie Jenkins), the woman whose child she had illegally purchased, prompting the writers to make Deirdre violent in order to justify Mary Alice's actions. Although Mary Alice and her family do not have much of a leading storyline thereafter, the mystery surrounding the character's suicide in the inaugural season is said to have informed and influenced every other season of the series. In 2006, when asked during an interview what viewers could expect from Mary Alice for the series' third season, Strong said that the character was "going to be back with an attitude", stating: "She will be a little less surreal, ethereal and a little more sassy, which means the show is going to be sassier." During the series' final season in 2011, the actress appears as Mary Alice's ghost to her suicidal friend Bree (Marcia Cross). Strong enjoyed filming that particular scene, as it was the only scene during the entire series that featured solely Mary Alice and Bree. She described the scene as one of her personal favorites and called it an "extraordinary opportunity", saying: "In a way, Mary Alice becomes [Bree's] conscience and her guide and her muse in knowing what to do with her life. And it was an exquisitely written scene and it was really, I think in my experience on the show, one of my favorite scenes I have ever shot."

== Storylines ==
=== First season ===
In the pilot episode, Mary Alice introduces herself as the stereotypical American housewife to husband Paul Young (Mark Moses) and son Zach (Cody Kasch). One Thursday, she proceeds to go to her hall closet to retrieve a revolver, and shoots herself in the head.

Paul asks Mary Alice’s neighbors and friends, Susan (Teri Hatcher), Lynette (Felicity Huffman), Bree (Marcia Cross) and Gabrielle (Eva Longoria), to go through her clothes and other belongings and then pack them up, as he thinks it will be too hard for him. The women end up finding a letter addressed to Mary Alice, a blackmail note reading, "I know what you did, it makes me sick, I’m going to tell." Thereafter, the women make a series of discoveries concerning Mary Alice’s past and her possible motives for ending her life; she was being treated by Dr. Albert Goldfine (Sam Lloyd) where she revealed that she once went by the name Angela, and she may have had something to do with a baby that went missing. Paul soon discovers who sent Mary Alice the note, their next-door neighbor struggling with financial difficulty, Martha Huber (Christine Estabrook), whom he ends up strangling to death out of pure rage and burying her body in the nearby forest. Meanwhile, her son Zach begins having flashbacks and is under the impression he killed a baby named Dana, who he believed to be his younger sister and reveals this to Julie Mayer (Andrea Bowen), Susan’s daughter. Paul worries over what Susan is spreading about their family, so he tells Susan in private that Zach accidentally killed his younger sister, Dana, and that he and Mary Alice covered it up to protect him. However, it becomes evident that this is not the case when Paul tells Zach that Dana is still very much alive.

Mary Alice and her husband Paul (Mark Moses) arrive on Wisteria Lane with their son Zach, in hopes of living a new life.

Felicia Tilman (Harriet Sansom Harris), Martha’s sister, soon arrives on Wisteria Lane to find out what happened to her sister. While inside Paul and Mary Alice’s house, she recognizes a picture of Mary Alice and claims her to be Angela, a nurse she worked with years prior in Utah, but Paul is adamant that she is mistaken. Felicia, however, knows that Mary Alice was in fact Angela and later tells Zach that she knew him when he was a baby, and that his original name was so lovely: Dana. In the first-season finale, the mystery behind Mary Alice’s suicide is revealed in full. In March 1990, Todd and Angela Forrest could not conceive and one night a woman named Deirdre Taylor (Jolie Jenkins), a heroin addict whom Angela had treated at the rehabilitation hospital where she worked as a nurse, came to their house looking for money and offered to sell her son to them, to which they eventually agreed. When Deirdre returned to the hospital as a patient soon after and suspicion arose as to where her child was, Angela knew they had to leave town. They moved to Fairview and bought a house on Wisteria Lane, changing their names to Paul, Mary Alice and Zach Young. In 1993, however, Deirdre came to their home, seemingly sober, demanding that she reclaim her son. After a verbal fight, Deirdre went to take her child, when Mary Alice stabbed and killed her. Zach woke up and saw the body, which led to years of his parents brushing off his memories of that night as nothing. Paul and Mary Alice dismembered Deirdre’s body, put it in a toy chest and buried it under their pool. Years later, Martha recognized Mary Alice in a group photo in Felicia’s house, leading to Felicia to tell Martha about how Angela and Todd possibly disappeared with Deirdre’s child and hopefully gave Dana a proper home. Martha then blackmailed Mary Alice and she, in desperation, committed suicide.

=== Later seasons ===
Mary Alice appears in flashbacks and dream sequences in the remainder of the series, during which several previously unknown details about the day she committed suicide are revealed. In season two, Mary Alice was the first of the housewives to move onto Wisteria Lane, to which she recounts how she met each of them and how they all became friends. In season three, Lynette has a recurring nightmare of the last time she spoke to Mary Alice; while she was reading her blackmail note for the first time on her front lawn, the day she committed suicide. Lynette asks if she is okay, to which Mary Alice says she is and while Lynette knew otherwise, she had groceries that needed refrigeration, so she simply told Mary Alice she would see her later. After a hostage situation at the local grocery store, Lynette has one final dream in which she speaks to Mary Alice and asks how she can help her; she tells her that we can’t prevent what we can’t predict, and to enjoy the beautiful day, as we get so few of them. Afterward, Mary Alice states that this was the last time Lynette would ever dream of her, and for her sake, she is grateful. In season four, Mary Alice appears in two separate flashbacks to when Katherine Mayfair (Dana Delany) was first living on Wisteria Lane; in "Now You Know", she and Susan knock on Katherine’s door wondering why there is a moving truck outside her house, to which a rattled Katherine says she got a new job in Chicago. In "Free", Mary Alice is shown to have been babysitting Katherine's daughter Dylan (Hailee Denham) on the night that Dylan's father Wayne (Gary Cole) returned, to which Katherine looks immediately panicked and Mary Alice apologizes for any wrongdoing.

In season five, Mary Alice appears in multiple flashbacks in "The Best Thing That Ever Could Have Happened", including when handyman Eli Scruggs (Beau Bridges) was first starting out and approached Mary Alice on the street, asking her if she had any work for him. After initially declining, she notices a hole in his shoe and asks if he can fix a broken vase. Years later, on the day Mary Alice committed suicide, Eli was at her house dropping something off. He asks if she is all right, to which she says she is, and just as he is about to leave she picks up the vase he glued for her and says she wants him to have it. Eli asks again if she is all right, and she politely asks him to leave. Later that day, after Mary Alice had shot herself, Eli watches emergency workers and neighbors gossiping from afar, regretting that he did nothing to save her. He then makes a vow to God to not only fix people's belongings but their lives as much as he can as well. In season six, Mary Alice again appears in a flashback in "Epiphany", when she notices four-year-old Eddie Orlofsky (Davin Ransom) witnessing his father leave their family. Mary Alice continues to check on Eddie and his mother Barbara (Diane Farr), bringing them a hot meal and later to bring a teddy bear for Eddie, where she finds the young child left home alone. Mary Alice finds Barbara in a bar, brings her home and scolds her for her poor parenting skills.

In season eight, Mary Alice appears in several flashbacks and as a ghost. In "Making the Connection", it is revealed that she contemplated calling her friends for advice and support after receiving the blackmail note, but ultimately chose not to and then committed suicide. In "Putting It Together", Mary Alice appears as a ghost to a suicidal Bree, who asks her if she remembers how happy their lives were on Wisteria Lane when she was alive and if she is happy now, to which Mary Alice says she is not unhappy. The series finale opens with the day Mary Alice arrived on Wisteria Lane. Martha is the first to greet her, and when Mary Alice seems unwilling to talk about where she is from, Martha guesses she has a secret and makes it her mission from that day forward to figure out what it is. At the end of the episode, Mary Alice's spirit is seen with the ghosts of those who have died over the years on Wisteria Lane, explaining her presence all this time has been in the hopes that they can give a message to those left behind that while their lives may be desperate, they are still worth living.

== Reception ==
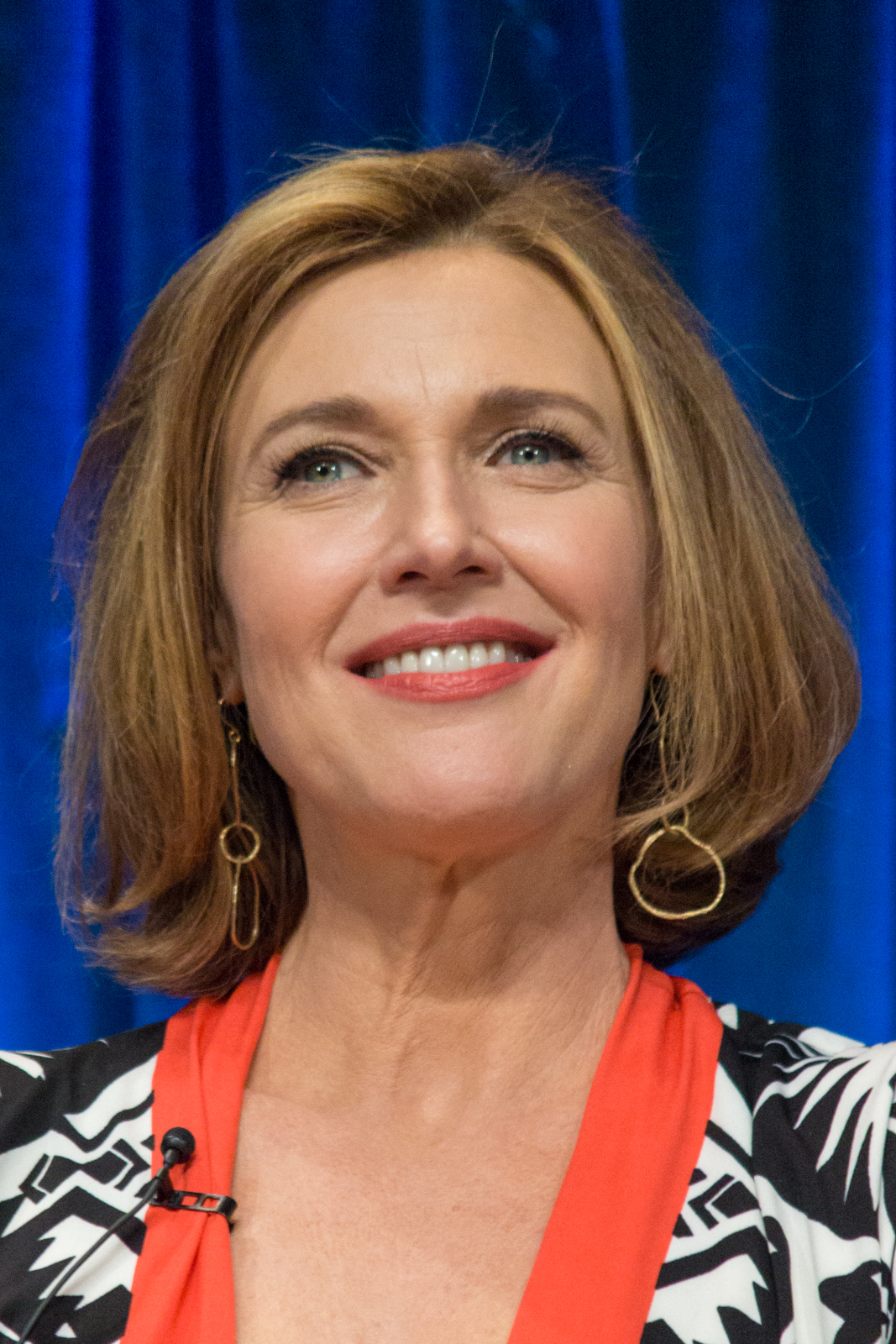
Brenda Strong was the subject of mainly positive reviews for her narration and occasional performances as Mary Alice.

Both the character and her role as narrator were generally well received by critics throughout the series, and for which Strong received nominations for multiple accolades. In his review of the pilot, Tom Shales of The Washington Post complimented Mary Alice character's narrations, writing: "Even though narration has become the most overused technique in prime-time television (needed, perhaps, to help move the narrative along quickly now that hour-length shows have shrunk to as little as 41 minutes plus commercials), the producers of Desperate Housewives use it well, and Strong's uncomplaining perkiness adds yet another layer of irony to the enterprise." Peter Schorn of IGN commended Strong's narrations as well as the mystery surrounding Mary Alice's suicide, calling the character's "dark secret" the "McGuffin that powers this first season". Matthew Gilbert of The Boston Globe described Mary Alice's suicide scene as "mysterious and somber but mostly funny", pointing out that the soundtrack music remains "light and happy" throughout and likened the character's narration to that of Glenn Close in Reversal of Fortune (1990). Celia Wren, also writing for The Washington Post, confirmed that the "idyllic small-town" setting of Desperate Housewives as well as Mary Alice's narration style as a deceased and omniscient narrator were influenced by Edgar Lee Masters' Spoon River Anthology (1915), for which she complimented the series, writing: "There's a lot of material to work with: Masters's poetic portrait gallery from 1915 gets its oomph from blowtorching the concept of idyllic small-town America. Its largely embittered personalities speak from beyond the grave of murders, seductions, suicides, hypocrisies, political corruption—enough scandalous behavior to make Desperate Housewives look like Little Women."

While reviewing the first-season finale, Dalton Ross of Entertainment Weekly praised the resolution to the mystery surrounding Mary Alice's death, calling it "both shocking and satisfying." On the other hand, Ann Hodgman of Entertainment Weekly was negative in her review and criticized the writers' decision to devoting too much of the episode to the Mary Alice storyline rather than focusing on the other characters. Tanner Stransky, also writing for the magazine, wrote that the producers "artfully blended" the mystery surrounding Mary Alice's suicide with "hot-button and often titillating plotlines" throughout the series' first season. In an article celebrating the tenth anniversary of the airing of the series' pilot episode, Matthew Jacobs of The Huffington Post complimented the "many layers of Mary Alice and her family's mystery" and likened it as "just as captivating" as the first season of Lost.

In 2009, Stransky was favorable of both Strong's narration and performance in the fifth season episode "The Best Thing That Could Have Ever Happened", describing Mary Alice's role in the episode as "heartbreaking" and writing: "I know we hear Brenda Strong nearly every week in her voiceovers, but it was so nice to see her on screen again! That lady can act." Matt Richenthal of TV Fanatic was bored by Mary Alice's flashback scenes in the sixth season episode "Epiphany", believing them to be unrealistic. Daniel Goldberg of Slant Magazine praised Mary Alice's narration in the series finale in 2012, writing: "There was one resolution that truly resonated. When the ladies all move out of [Wisteria] Lane and politely promise to keep in touch and visit, Mary Alice (Brenda Strong) takes the opportunity to unearth one last lie. With one of her most somber voiceovers ever, she lets us in on a secret that the housewives already know: They won’t keep in touch, and they won’t visit. The moment is far more unsettling and existential than the overblown sequence of the desperately deceased gathering to wave Susan goodbye. Deep friendships and passing acquaintances can never be replicated, and these are the endings we experience every day, even as we try to deny their finality." Writing for Backstage magazine in 2012, Jeffery Self wrote that Strong's narration as Mary Alice led to her voice becoming "one of the most familiar on television". As a result of her popularity as the series' narrator, Anna Silman of Vulture magazine described Strong as "everybody's favorite deceased housewife/omniscient narrator" in 2014.

For her narration as Mary Alice, Strong was twice nominated for the Primetime Emmy Award for Outstanding Voice-Over Performance in 2011 and 2012. Additionally, as a cast member of Desperate Housewives, she twice received the Screen Actors Guild Award for Outstanding Performance by an Ensemble in a Comedy Series, among five consecutive nominations for the award between 2005 and 2009.
