= Next (Desperate Housewives) =

- Desperate Housewives episode
- Bree Van de Kamp (Marcia Cross) changes the tie on her husband's corpse. This scene received critical praise and was considered one of the most memorable scenes in "Next".
- Episode no.: Season 2 Episode 1
- Directed by: Larry Shaw
- Written by: Jenna Bans and Kevin Murphy
- Production code: 201
- Original air date: September 25, 2005
- Running time: 44 minutes

Guest appearances
- Jesse Metcalfe as John Rowland; Joely Fisher as Nina Fletcher; Currie Graham as Ed Ferrara; Andy Umberger as Officer Romslo; Dakin Matthews as Reverend Sykes; Shirley Knight as Phyllis Van de Kamp; Charlie Babcock as Stu Durber; Nikki Braendlin as Receptionist; Pat Crawford Brown as Ida Greenberg; Stacy Solodkin as Haggard Woman

Episode chronology
← Previous "One Wonderful Day"	Next → "You Could Drive a Person Crazy"
- Desperate Housewives season 2

"Next" is the second season premiere episode of the American comedy-drama series Desperate Housewives, and the 24th episode overall. It was originally broadcast in the United States on September 25, 2005, on ABC. It was written by Jenna Bans and Kevin Murphy and was directed by Larry Shaw.

In the episode, Susan (Teri Hatcher) recovers from having been held hostage while Gabrielle (Eva Longoria) attempts to salvage her marriage to her incarcerated husband, Carlos (Ricardo Antonio Chavira). Meanwhile, Bree (Marcia Cross) deals with her mother-in-law following her husband's death and Lynette (Felicity Huffman) goes back to work. The episode also introduces the mystery storyline revolving around Betty Applewhite (Alfre Woodard) and her family.

According to Nielsen ratings, "Next" was watched by 28.4 million viewers, making it the most watched season premiere on ABC in nine years. The episode also ranks as the second-most watched in series history, behind the first-season finale in May 2005. The episode received general positive reviews, with Cross earning universal praise for her performance. Critics enjoyed Woodard's acting as well as her character's storyline.

== Plot ==
=== Background ===
Desperate Housewives focuses on the residents living in the suburban neighborhood of Wisteria Lane. In previous episodes, Mike Delfino (James Denton) learns that he is the biological father of Zach Young (Cody Kasch), whose adopted parents, Mary Alice (Brenda Strong) and Paul (Mark Moses), killed Mike's previous girlfriend and Zach's biological mother years earlier. Mike kidnapped Paul and left him stranded in the desert while Zach holds Mike's current girlfriend, Susan Mayer (Teri Hatcher) hostage as part of his plan to kill Mike. Tom Scavo (Doug Savant) quit his job and decided to become a stay-at-home father, forcing his wife, Lynette (Felicity Huffman) to reenter the work force. Gabrielle Solis's (Eva Longoria) affair with her teenage gardener, John Rowland (Jesse Metcalfe), is exposed just as she discovers she is pregnant and her husband, Carlos (Ricardo Antonio Chavira), is sentenced to time in prison. Bree Van de Kamp (Marcia Cross) learned that her husband, Rex (Steven Culp), died while awaiting surgery. Also, Betty Applewhite (Alfre Woodard) and her son, Matthew (Mehcad Brooks), moved to Wisteria Lane.

=== Episode ===
Mike arrives home to find Zach holding Susan hostage. Before Zach has the opportunity to kill Mike, Susan wrestles the gun away from him and Zach runs away. Later, Susan discovers that Mike does not want to press charges against Zach, who is still missing. When she questions him, Mike confesses that Zach is his biological son. Susan tearfully congratulates Mike, but tells him that she cannot keep dating him if he continues to search for Zach, given Zach's history with her daughter Julie.

Rex's mother, Phyllis Van de Kamp (Shirley Knight), comes to town for Rex's funeral. She and Bree clash heads throughout her visit, especially when Phyllis claims that Bree made Rex miserable during his last years, prompting Bree to disinvite her from the funeral. Eventually, Bree reconsiders; however, during the service, Bree discovers that Rex is being buried in his high school tie, which Phyllis insisted but Bree expressly forbade. Bree changes Rex's tie in the middle of the funeral.

With Carlos in prison, John assumes that he and Gabrielle will continue their relationship, but Gabrielle is livid after John told Carlos about their affair. Meanwhile, Carlos demands a paternity test if he and Gabrielle are to work on their marriage. Unwilling to actually take a test, Gabrielle obtains another patient's results and passes them off to Carlos as her own. Nevertheless, Carlos tells her that he is not satisfied.

Lynette interviews for a job in an advertisement firm. Her interviewer, an irritable woman named Nina Fletcher (Joely Fisher), is skeptical of Lynette's competence after learning that she has four children, but asks her to come back for a final interview with her boss anyway. After Tom throws out his back, Lynette is forced to bring Penny, her toddler, to the second interview. Despite these unusual circumstances, Lynette manages to impress Nina's boss, Ed Ferrara (Currie Graham), who hires her on the spot.

As Betty, a former concert pianist, continues to get settled in the neighborhood, she agrees to play at Rex's funeral. Later, she and Matthew bring a tray of food to a chained prisoner in their basement.

== Production ==
"Next" was written by Jenna Bans and Kevin Murphy and directed by Larry Shaw. While developing storylines for the second season, series creator Marc Cherry stated, "I want to keep finding new ways to talk about issues that relate to everyday women," explaining that the show needs to focus on "small, real, everyday issues" in order to keep the audience interested. Cherry cited the Lynette storyline as an example of this strategy: "Lynette will have a job next season (returning to her advertising roots), so I want to address how difficult it is to go to work all day and then come home and be expected to also take care of your house." Huffman recognized that her character's storylines needed a change of pace, but hoped that Lynette's domestic life would still play an integral role this season. "My hope is to not get lost in the corporate world; that it's still a home and family/husband and children story," she explained. "But how many times can you go, 'Kids, clear your plates!'" The episode also introduced Joely Fisher as Lynette's new boss, Nina Fletcher. Fisher describes her character as "nasty," elaborating: "Lynette suddenly has to come up against this tiger lady who never stops reminding Lynette that she's childless by choice. Even though Nina is not a housewife, she is desperate in her own way." Due to the death of his character, Steven Culp did not return to the series for the second season. For the open casket scene in "Next", producers created a life mask of the actor. Savant was promoted to series regular after appearing as a recurring guest star throughout the first season.

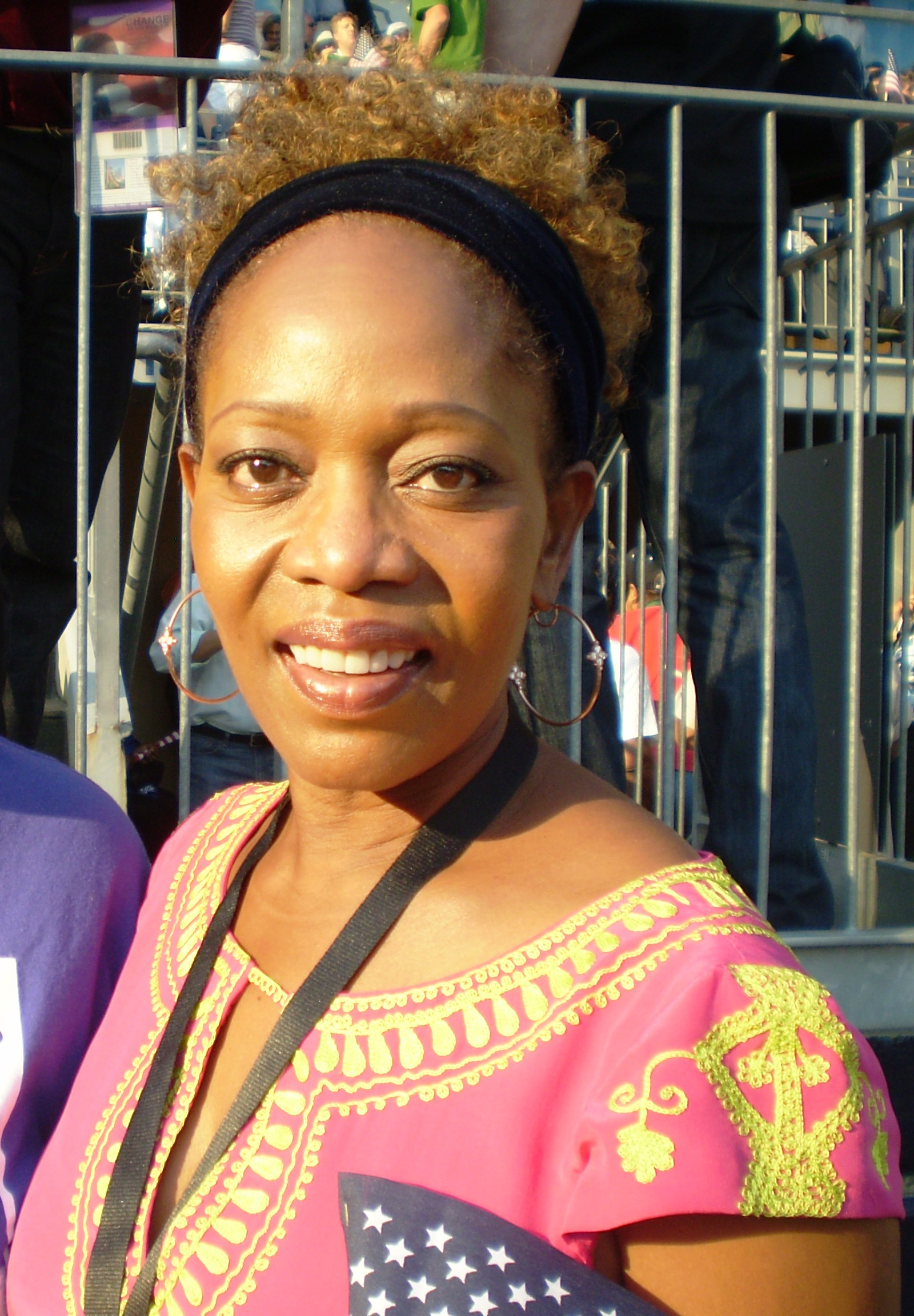
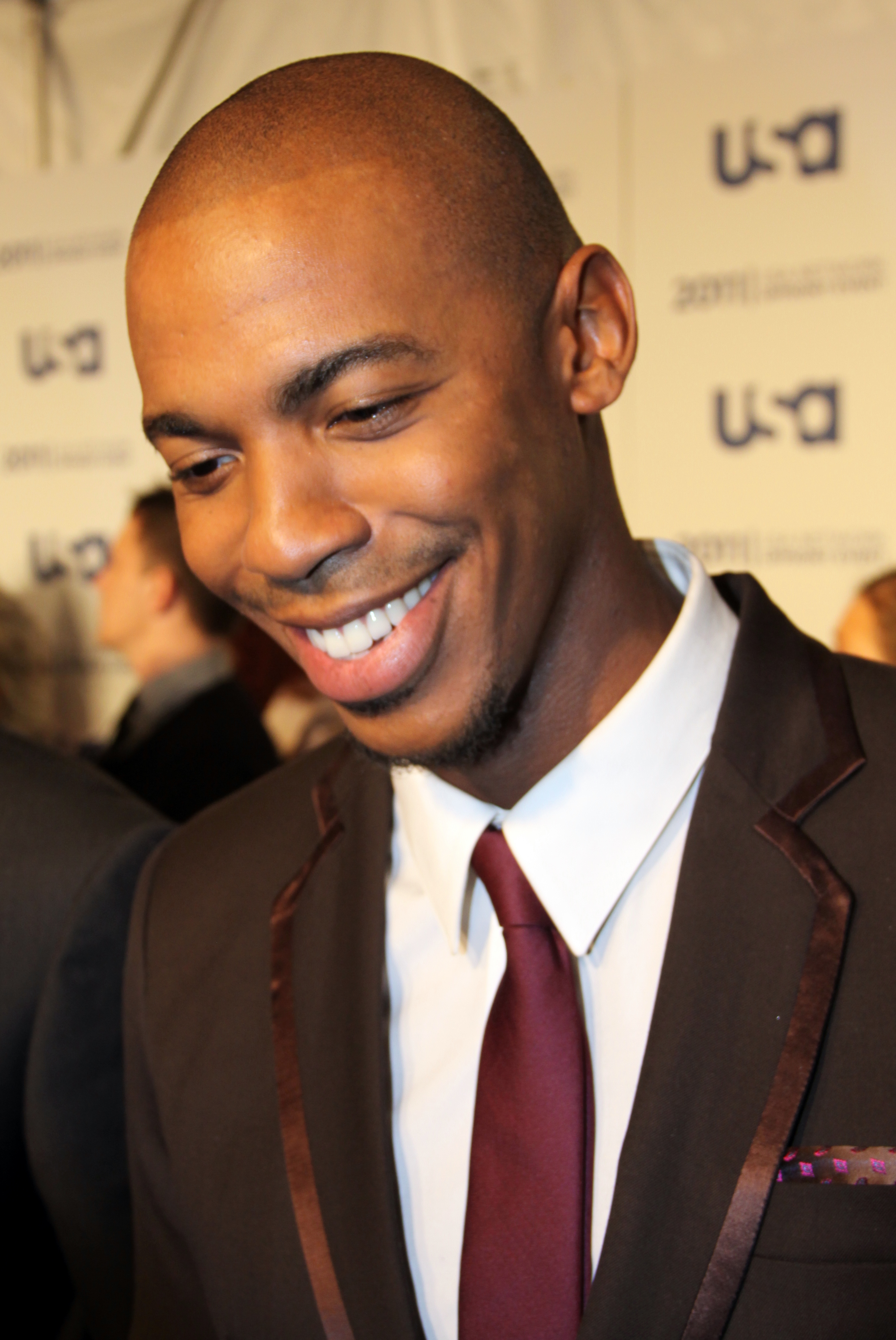
Alfre Woodard (left) and Mehcad Brooks (right) continued appearing as Betty and Matthew Applewhite, a mother and son who move to Wisteria Lane. "Next" introduced their mystery storyline for the season.

The episode is the first to feature Alfre Woodard and Mehcad Brooks as series regulars after they were introduced in the final two episodes of the first season. Woodard played Betty Applewhite, a "deeply religious, overbearing single mother" while Mehcad portrayed her son, Matthew. In regards to the characters and their mystery storyline, Cherry stated: "They come on the street; they seem like nice people—but they've got a secret. And it's pretty gothic. It's real and human and awful all at the same time." Woodard commented that her character "never means harm ... Let's just say she has flaws. She had to make some really tough decisions quick and if the law ever catches up with her, she'll have to serve time ... But they'll never catch her." The final scene in which Betty and Matthew bring food to the prisoner in their basement was originally intended for the first-season finale but saved for "Next" instead.

While the Applewhites are regarded as the first major black characters on the series, Cherry stated that the role of Betty was originally offered to two white film actresses, both of whom turned it down due to financial and time commitment issues. He clarified: "There's nothing strategically black about her character. Her color is incidental." Woodard had never seen the show before accepting the role. Desperate Housewives producers sent her fifteen episodes of the show, which she divided amongst various family members. After they compared storylines, Woodard recalled that she became "instantly hooked" on the series. Woodard reported experiencing heavy media attention after accepting the role. Both Brooks and his brother, Billy, auditioned for the role of Matthew. The final decision came down to both brothers as well as two other actors. According to Cherry, Brooks was cast because he exuded a "dangerous" element, as well as "a combination of this wholesome, sweet quality and a dark, brooding quality."

== Reception ==
=== Ratings ===
According to Nielsen ratings, "Next" was watched by 28.4 million viewers. It held a 12.1 rating/26 share on its original broadcast, indicating a 36 percent increase since the series premiere one year earlier and helping ABC earn its largest Sunday night audience in 10 years. Additionally, it was ABC's most watched season premiere in nine years. The episode was the second-most watched program of the week, behind only CSI on CBS. It was the most watched program among viewers 18 to 49 years of age. The episode is the second-most watched episode of the series, following the first-season finale in May 2005.

=== Critical reception ===
Variety's Brian Lowry gave the episode a positive review. He opined that the Lynette storyline looked "extremely promising" and enjoyed the addition of Joely Fisher to the cast as Lynette's "tight-assed new boss." He identified the Bree storyline as "the real water-cooler sequence" and complimented Marcia Cross' performance. However, Lowry criticized the Gabrielle and Susan storylines, opining that they are "exhibiting signs of wear and tear." Michael Slezak of Entertainment Weekly noted that the episode had "a particularly sleepy opening 20 minutes" while its exciting plot points all occurred in the second half of the episode. He praised the scene in which Bree changes the tie on Rex's corpse and called Cross' performance throughout the episode "pitch-perfect." Slezak also complimented Huffman's performance, but wondered if Fisher was "a steely enough an actress to go Manolo-a-Manolo with Huffman every week." Though he criticized the repetitive nature of the Susan and Gabrielle storylines, Slezak thought that the Applewhite mystery would help reduce the show's chances of falling into a sophomore slump. He praised Woodward's acting as well as her character's storyline, opining, "there's something so inherently warm and maternal in Woodard's performance, such apple-pie wholesomeness, that it makes her touches of menace all the more chilling."

Gael Fashingbauer Cooper of MSNBC complimented that Applewhite storyline, writing: "Forget Lynette's career stress, Gabrielle's baby daddy drama, and even Bree's new widowhood: This story has legs, and apparently arms." She found it strange that the Bree, Andrew, and Danielle characters showed little emotion in regards to Rex's death. Additionally, she noted that the Lynette and Gabrielle storylines provided comic relief while Susan, a character "so often saddled with the comic relief of the show, had a sad and serious premiere." Sarah Gilbert of TV Squad gave the episode a positive review, stating the episode delivered "lots of juicy resolution, several power suits, and (you guessed it) lots of tears and shouting." The Futon Critic selected "Next" as the 42nd best television episode of 2005, writing, "Say what you will about the show's rocky sophomore season but one can't deny how strongly it started," and citing the tie-changing scene as the episode's most memorable moment.

In 2005, Bans and Murphy were nominated for a Writers Guild of America Award for Best Episodic Comedy writing, but lost to Jenji Kohan, who penned the pilot episode of the Showtime series Weeds.
