= One Wonderful Day =

- Desperate Housewives episode
- Episode no.: Season 1 Episode 23
- Directed by: Larry Shaw
- Written by: John Pardee; Joey Murphy; Marc Cherry; Tom Spezialy; Kevin Murphy
- Production code: 123
- Original air date: May 22, 2005
- Running time: 43 minutes

Guest appearances
- Doug Savant as Tom Scavo; Harriet Sansom Harris as Felicia Tilman; Richard Burgi as Karl Mayer; Mehcad Brooks as Matthew Applewhite; Jolie Jenkins as Deirdre Taylor; Terry Bozeman as Dr. Lee Craig; Ryan Carnes as Justin; John Haymes Newton as Jonathan Lithgow; Brent Kinsman as Preston Scavo; Shane Kinsman as Porter Scavo; Alfre Woodard as Betty Applewhite; Zane Huett as Parker Scavo; Steve Tom as Judge; Gregory Wagrowski as Prosecutor; Tanner Maguire as 4-year-old Zach Young; William Dennis Hurt as Realtor; Kevin E. West as Cop; Shirley Jordan as Nurse; Lee Whitaker as Box Boy

Episode chronology
← Previous "Goodbye for Now"	Next → "Next"
- Desperate Housewives season 1

"One Wonderful Day" is the 23rd episode and first season finale of the American comedy-drama television series Desperate Housewives. It was originally broadcast in the United States on ABC (American Broadcasting Company) on May 22, 2005. The episode was directed by Larry Shaw and written by John Pardee, Joey Murphy, series creator Marc Cherry, Tom Spezialy, and Kevin Murphy.

In the episode, the mystery surrounding the suicide of series narrator Mary Alice Young (Brenda Strong) is resolved. Carlos (Ricardo Antonio Chavira) finally discovers the truth about Gabrielle's (Eva Longoria) affair while Bree (Marcia Cross) learns that her husband has died. Meanwhile, Zach (Cody Kasch) holds Susan (Teri Hatcher) hostage and Tom (Doug Savant) forces Lynette (Felicity Huffman) to go back to work.

According to Nielsen ratings, the episode drew over 30 million viewers upon its initial broadcasting in the United States, becoming the most-watched program of the night across all networks, as well as the highest-rated episode of Desperate Housewives. The episode received mostly positive reviews from critics, most of whom complimented the writers for wrapping up the season's major story arcs. However, Ann Hodgman of Entertainment Weekly criticized the episode for being predictable and spending too much time on the Mary Alice storyline. In 2009, TV Guide listed "One Wonderful Day" as the 55th best television episode of all-time.

== Plot ==
=== Background ===
Desperate Housewives focuses on the lives of several residents of Wisteria Lane and primarily on the friends of Mary Alice Young (Brenda Strong), whose suicide in the first episode serves as the subject of the season's mystery. In previous episodes, Paul (Mark Moses) avenges his wife's suicide by killing their neighbor and her blackmailer, Martha Huber (Christine Estabrook). As a result, Martha's sister, Felicia Tilman (Harriet Sansom Harris), asks Mike Delfino (James Denton) to kill Paul. Additionally, Mike investigates the years-long disappearance of his girlfriend, Deirdre Taylor (Jolie Jenkins), whom he suspects Paul murdered.

Elsewhere, Gabrielle Solis (Eva Longoria) discovers she is pregnant, but is unsure if the father of her child is her husband, Carlos Solis (Ricardo Antonio Chavira), or her lover and former gardener, John Rowland (Jesse Metcalfe). Carlos is charged with a hate crime for attacking two gay men whom he suspected are sleeping with his wife. Bree and Rex's (Steven Culp) marriage continues to deteriorate and Rex suffers a second heart attack. Tom Scavo (Doug Savant) quits his job after learning that his wife, Lynette (Felicity Huffman), sabotaged his promotion for the sake of their family and Susan Mayer (Teri Hatcher) and Mike decide to move in together.

=== Episode ===
Felicia takes in Paul's son, Zach (Cody Kasch), informing him that Paul will not be returning. Zach violently attacks Felicia, forcing her to reveal that Mike has taken Paul away to kill him. Later that day, Susan goes to Mike's house to feed his dog and discovers Zach waiting with a gun. He holds Susan hostage and explains his plan to kill Mike when he returns home. Meanwhile, Mike takes Paul to a desert and coerces him into explaining the truth behind Deirdre's death. Paul explains that twelve years earlier, Deirdre, a drug addict, sold Mary Alice and Paul her baby. The couple relocated to Wisteria Lane to avoid the discovery of their crime. Sometime later, a sober Deirdre finally tracked down the Young family and attempted to take her son back. Mary Alice stabbed and killed Deirdre to prevent her from taking Zach. Together, Mary Alice and Paul buried Deirdre's body beneath their pool.

Rex learns that he will have to undergo surgery following his heart attack. Before the operation, Rex's doctor suggests that Bree may have been poisoning him, citing their marital issues as a possible motive. Rex writes a note informing Bree that he understands and forgives her and dies soon after. During Carlos's trial, John informs Carlos that he had been having an affair with Gabrielle, sending Carlos into a violent outburst in the courthouse. Elsewhere, Lynette learns that Tom has quit his job as a result of Lynette's betrayal. He then decides that she will go back to work and he will be a stay-at-home father.

== Production ==
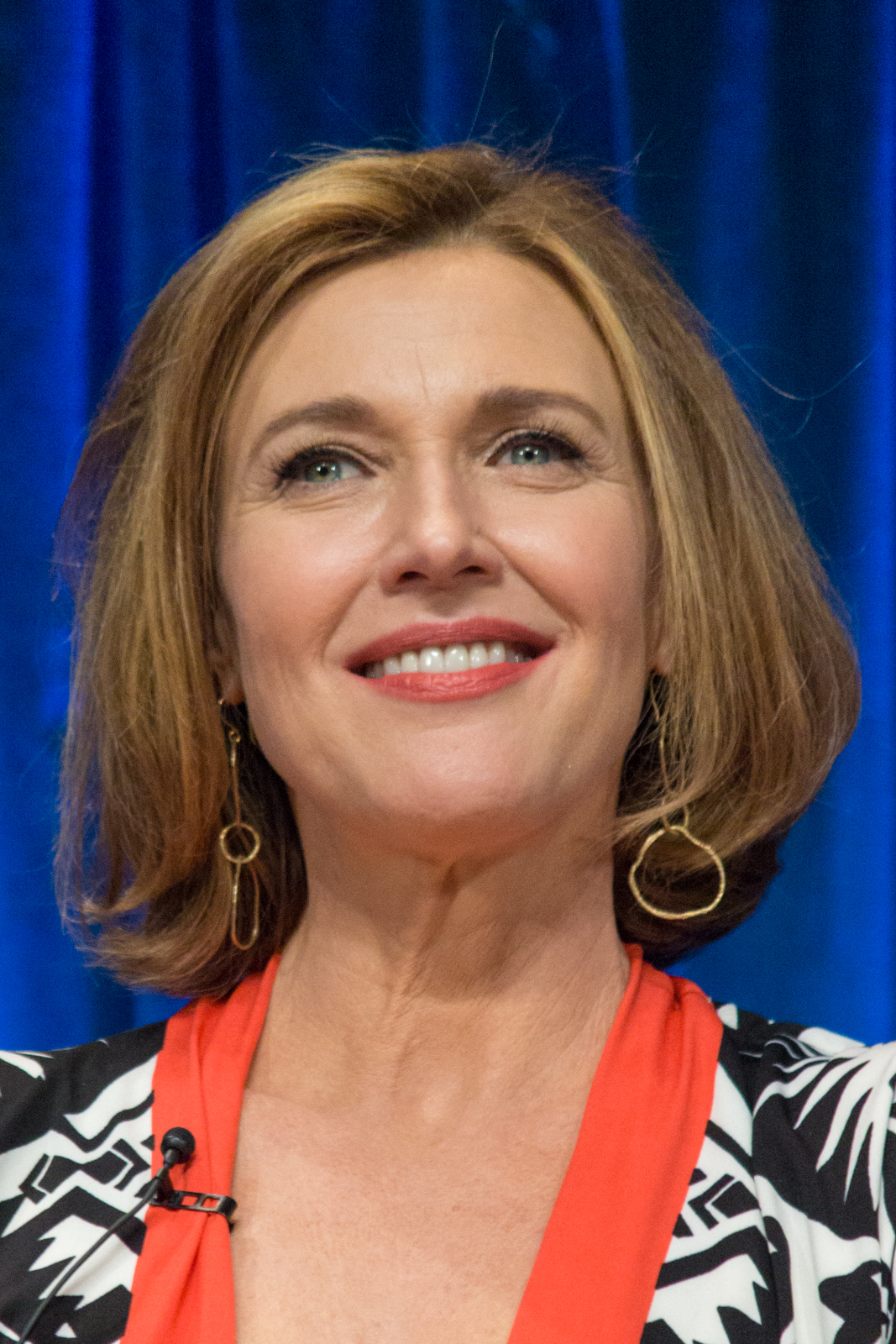
Brenda Strong portrays Mary Alice Young, the series' deceased narrator. "One Wonderful Day" answers the season-long questions surrounding her mysterious suicide

"One Wonderful Day" was directed by Larry Shaw and written by John Pardee, Joey Murphy, series creator Marc Cherry, Tom Spezialy, and Kevin Murphy. It was filmed in April 2005. The writers were still working on the script when filming began; as a result, the ending narration was written based on the visuals that had been filmed. The episode focused largely on the conclusion of the Mary Alice mystery storyline. Cherry had wanted there to be a "definite end" to the mystery, hoping to avoid similar viewer fatigue that Twin Peaks suffered after drawing out its central mystery past its first season. The storyline relied on two flashback sequences, which featured Jolie Jenkins as Deirdre Taylor. Though "One Wonderful Day" was her first on-screen appearance in the series, Jenkins was cast in the role in the fall of 2004, as scenes earlier in the season required photographs of the Deirdre character. Because no material had been written for the character at the time, Jenkins did not have to audition for the role. ABC executives initially protested the writers' decision to have Mary Alice purposefully kill Deirdre, prompting the writers to make Deirdre violent in order to justify Mary Alice's actions. The writers struggled with whether or not to include a gunshot at the end of the episode when Mike returns to his house where Zach is holding Susan hostage. Ultimately, Spezialy convinced the other writers not to include it.

"One Wonderful Day" also introduced the second-season mystery surrounding Betty Applewhite (Alfre Woodard) and Matthew Applewhite (Mehcad Brooks). Cherry revealed, "they come on the street; they seem like nice people — but they've got a secret. And it's pretty gothic. It's real and human and awful all at the same time." Another scene featuring the Applewhite family, in which Betty brings food to a prisoner in their basement, was cut from this episode but was used in the second season premiere, "Next". Cherry's inspiration for the Lynette storyline came from his own childhood experience when his mother returned to work. He commented: "The predicament of any working woman is that you can love your career, but there is something ... to be said for getting to stay home every day with your kids, and you don't want anyone else to be better at it than you are. Felicity Huffman expressed satisfaction with how her storyline was handled, explaining that Lynette "didn't deal with [Tom's potential promotion] in the most straightforward way, but she was fighting for her family. They were noble motives." While discussing the courtroom scene in which Carlos attacks John, Ricardo Antonio Chavira commented: "People can see the full rage that is in my character. I'm yelling at him, 'I'm gonna kill you' ... Then I broke into Spanish: "Yo voy a matar!" ... I just went for it ... Then I looked, and Jesse [Metcalfe] had the most honest look of sheer terror. I think I scared the living shit out of him."

The scene in which Susan, Lynette, and Gabrielle comfort Bree at the hospital was the last scene of the season involving the four principal characters. Teri Hatcher commented: "It was a heavy scene. There was a very genuine and deeply felt recognition that all four of us together as a team appreciated the ride we'd had this season and were grateful that we'd survived it together." An extension of the scene, in which the women discuss Susan's discovery of Martha Huber's journal, was cut for time, though it was aired on Good Morning America on May 23, 2005, one day after the episode's broadcast, and was included on the first season DVD set. The death of one housewife's husband was confirmed prior to the episode's broadcast. Steven Culp was not surprised when his character was killed off, stating "I had a sneaking suspicion someone was going to go." Producer and writer Kevin Murphy explained the reasoning for killing off the Rex character: "As we neared the end of season 1, our plan was that each woman would enter a new life chapter. Gabrielle would learn to function without Carlos, Susan and Mike would build their relationship, Lynette would go back to work, and Bree would become a single woman. We either had to have Rex divorce her or die." Cherry named the scene in which Bree finishes her spring cleaning before mourning the death of her husband as one of his top three favorites of the season, stating: "It was one of the favorite things I wrote because it was so true to her character. She had to finish the cleaning she started, and she comes in and everything’s perfect." A scene between Gabrielle and John was also cut for time.

== Reception ==
=== Ratings ===
According to ABC, "One Wonderful Day" drew 30.620 million viewers. According to Nielsen ratings, the episode scored a 13.2 rating among viewers 18 to 49 years of age, a 28.2 percent increase from the season's average rating of 10.3 in the demographic. It was the most-watched program of the night across all networks, outperforming repeat episodes of CSI and Crossing Jordan on CBS and NBC, respectively, as well as Fox's broadcast of Star Wars: Episode II – Attack of the Clones. The episode was the third most-watch program of the week across all networks and one of only three programs to surpass 30 million viewers. It was also the most-watched season finale for a freshman series since ER ten years earlier.

=== Critical reception ===
Entertainment Weekly's Dalton Ross named the episode as one of the season's best, commending the fact that "most of the main questions were actually answered," unlike the season finale of Lost. He praised the Bree storyline as well as the conclusion to the Mary Alice mystery, calling it "both shocking and satisfying." Gael Fashingbauer Cooper of MSNBC also compared the episode to the Lost season finale, writing: "'Desperate Housewives' is willing to answer some of its mysterious questions and give readers a little bit of closure. 'Lost,' heading into its own two-hour finale this Wednesday, is still dangling a dozen carrots in front of impatient viewers." Cooper felt that the episode was a satisfying conclusion to the season opining that "by allowing some of its plots to remain tantalizing mysteries, yet offering up the satisfaction of explaining others, 'Desperate Housewives' has smartly set things up for its audience to return for its new season next fall." Frazier Moore of USA Today called the finale "a smashing close" to the first season. Moore expressed interest in how the cliffhangers would be resolved, as well as in the Betty Applewhite character. He also theorized that Rex's death was a ruse, writing: "Reminder: The audience saw no death scene and no body. When has Desperate Housewives exercised restraint without an ulterior motive?"

Ann Hodgman of Entertainment Weekly was negative in her review and dismissed the episode for feeling "like a plateful of warmed-up leftovers." Hodgman criticized the writers' decision to devoting too much of the episode to the Mary Alice storyline rather than focusing on the other characters. She wrote that Rex's death did not come as a surprise, noting: "Just as a TV or movie cop is inevitably shot after he announces that he's about to retire, we know it's over for Rex the minute Bree rests her head on his feeble chest and promises him he'll make it." Hodgman stated that her interest in the Gabrielle and Carlos storyline was ruined by John telling Carlos about the affair rather than Carlos discovering it himself. She also declared that the Lynette storyline was "wrapped up almost as perfunctorily, or maybe it only seems that way because it's long been so obvious that they were heading toward one of those folktales where the husband and wife switch places." Hodgman concluded by saying the fates of Susan and Mike are predictable, as the characters are too important to be killed off. In 2009, TV Guide ranked the episode #55 on its list of "100 Greatest Episodes of All-Time". The Futon Critic ranked the episode as the 19th best television episode of 2005, calling it "note-perfect."
