= Colonial Street =

Backlot street

Coordinates: 34°08′21″N 118°20′43″W

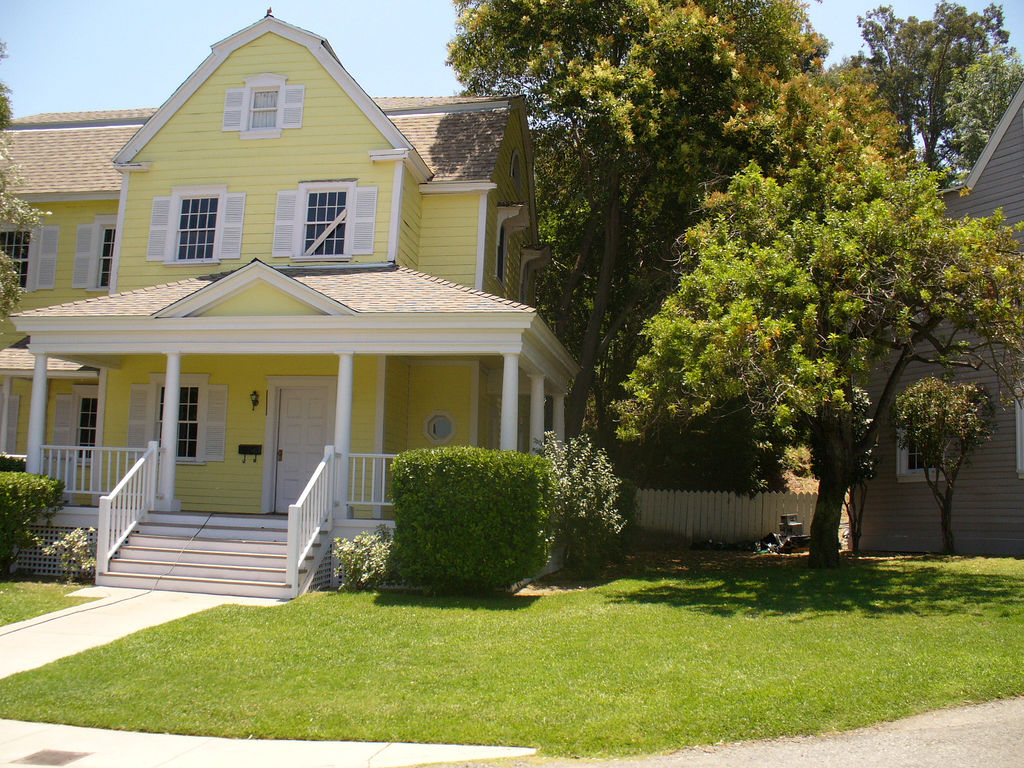
- Corner House (1936)
- Interactive map of Colonial Street
- Location: Universal Studios Lot, Universal City, United States

Colonial Street is one of the backlot street sets at the Universal Studios Lot in Universal City, California. The street set has a long history, spanning over 80 years of movies and television. From 2004 to 2012, it was used in the filming of the TV series Desperate Housewives, in which the street was known as Wisteria Lane. After the production of Desperate Housewives ended, the street underwent a small makeover to remove aspects of Wisteria Lane, so that it could be used in other productions. As of May 2012, most of the iconic white fencing and wisteria has been removed. Colonial Street has since been used for the NBC comedy About a Boy and the NBC series Telenovela, featuring Desperate Housewives star Eva Longoria.

== History ==
In 1988, Colonial Street was overhauled for Tom Hanks comedy The 'Burbs. The old Leave It to Beaver home was removed. (Note: see a 1988 map here) Following the movie, the homes were rearranged again so Circle Drive was connected once again. (Note: see a 1989-1996 map here)

Among the most noticeable changes were the removals of a church facade, seen on Murder She Wrote, in order to make room for Edie's house, and of the so-called Colonial Mansion, which was replaced by a park.

== Wisteria Lane ==
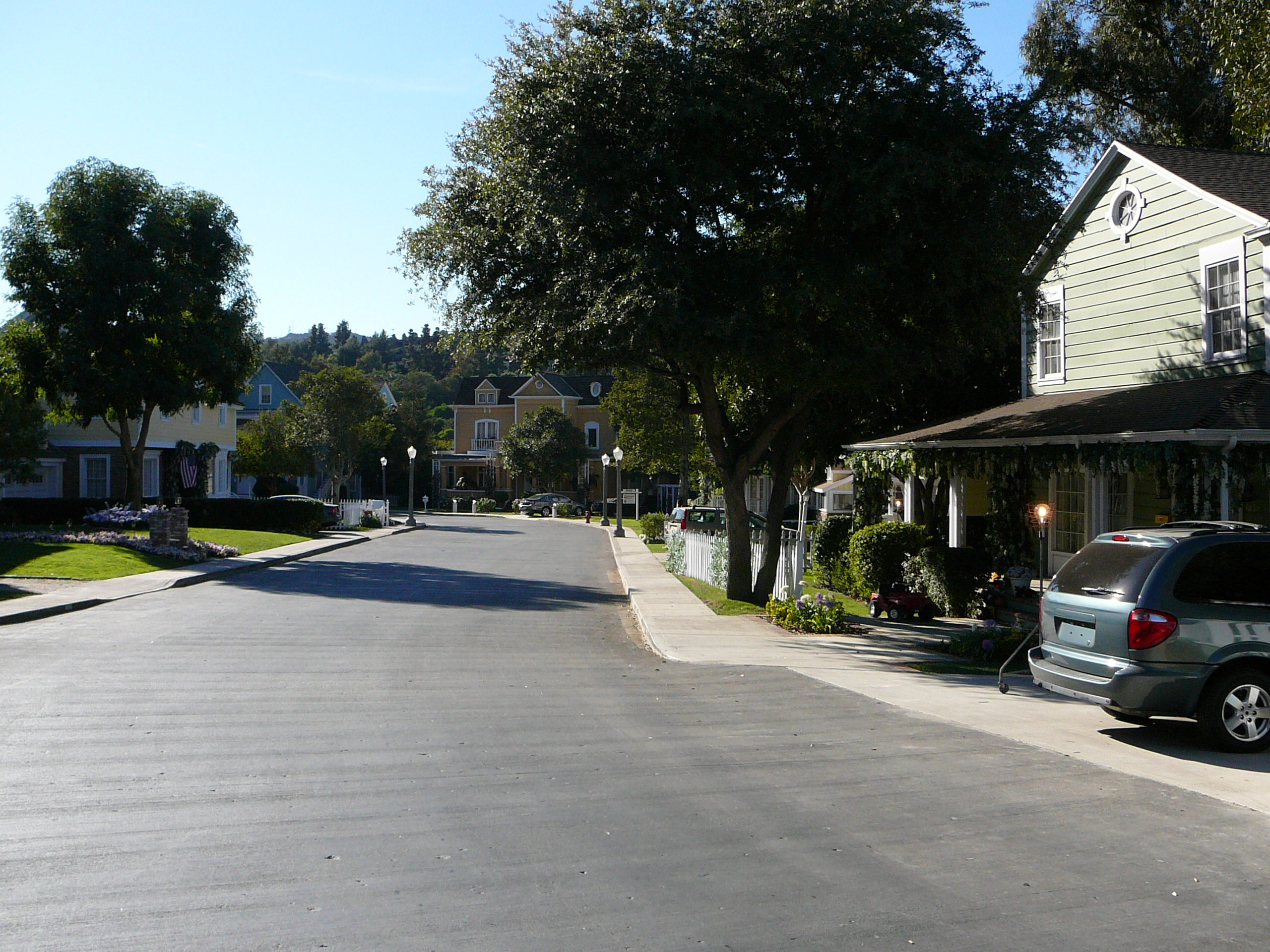
Colonial Street as "Wisteria Lane" on the ABC show Desperate Housewives (2006)

Wisteria Lane is a fictional street, appearing in the American television series Desperate Housewives.

== Buildings ==
Colonial Street
Building Number	Image	Name	Lifespan	Productions		
Building Number	Image	Name	Lifespan	Non Desperate Housewives	Desperate Housewives	
Building Number	Image	Name	Lifespan	Non Desperate Housewives	Address	Families
BLDG #1		Delta House (originally Keller house)	1950–present	The Desperate Hours (1955); Lucas Tanner (1974–75); Delta House (1979); The 'Burbs (1989)	4347 Wisteria Lane	Ida Greenberg (?–2008); Karen McCluskey (2008); Mitzi Kinsky (2014–present)
BLDG #2		Allison Home	1946–present	So Goes My Love (1946); Harvey (1950) (Note: Known as the "Harvey House" for most of its history, the elements of this house had been replicated many times by Universal Studios. This allowed for quick construction of a cheap facade with high-quality design characteristics, when a production needed one. Elements of the "Harvey House" stock unit was used for the construction of the Bates House for the 1960 film Psycho, which has led many to assume that the "Psycho House" was erected on Colonial Street. The Bates House was erected on a hill off Laramie Street, a "Wild West" backlot street far to the south on the Universal lot.); The Ghost and Mr. Chicken (1966); Delta House (1979); The 'Burbs (1989); Mockingbird Lane (2012)	4349 Wisteria Lane	Gabrielle Solis (2003–2017); Carlos Solis (2003–2006 and 2008–2017)
BLDG #3		Munster Mansion (originally Maxim house)	1946–present	So Goes My Love (1946); The Munsters (1964–1966); The 'Burbs (1989)	4351 Wisteria Lane	Mullin family (?-2005)
BLDG #3		Munster Mansion (originally Maxim house)	1946–present	So Goes My Love (1946); The Munsters (1964–1966); The 'Burbs (1989)	4351 Wisteria Lane	Betty Applewhite (2005–2006)
BLDG #3		Munster Mansion (originally Maxim house)	1946–present	So Goes My Love (1946); The Munsters (1964–1966); The 'Burbs (1989)	4351 Wisteria Lane	Alma Hodge (2007)
BLDG #3		Munster Mansion (originally Maxim house)	1946–present	So Goes My Love (1946); The Munsters (1964–1966); The 'Burbs (1989)	4351 Wisteria Lane	Hunter/McDermott (2007–present)
BLDG #4		Johnson Home	1955–present	All That Heaven Allows (1955) Ron's Barn : Rock Hudson; Send Me No Flowers (1964); Marcus Welby, M.D. (1969-1976); The Hardy Boys (1977–79); The Burbs (1989); The New Lassie (1989); Buffy the Vampire Slayer (1999); Deep Impact (1998); Never Have I Ever (TV series) (2020)	4353 Wisteria Lane	Susan Mayer (1992–2015 and 2016–2017); Paul Young (2015-2016)
BLDG #5		Dana Home	1941–present	Nice Girl? (1941); Bedtime for Bonzo (1951); The Thrill of It All (1963); The 'Burbs (1989)	4355 Wisteria Lane	Scavo family (1998–2017)
BLDG #6		McCluskey Home	2007–present	The Little Rascals Save the Day (2014); About a Boy (2014–2015)	4358 Wisteria Lane	Karen McCluskey (1982–2017)
BLDG #7		Walter's House	Around 1987–present	The Burbs (1989); Ace Hardware Commercial (2013–Present); About a Boy (2014–2015); Good Girls (2021)	4356 Wisteria Lane	Lilian Simms (?–2004); Katherine Davis (1994–1995)
BLDG #7		Walter's House	Around 1987–present	The Burbs (1989); Ace Hardware Commercial (2013–Present); About a Boy (2014–2015); Good Girls (2021)	4356 Wisteria Lane	Mike Delfino (2004–2007)
BLDG #7		Walter's House	Around 1987–present	The Burbs (1989); Ace Hardware Commercial (2013–Present); About a Boy (2014–2015); Good Girls (2021)	4356 Wisteria Lane	Carlos Solis (2006–2007)
BLDG #7		Walter's House	Around 1987–present	The Burbs (1989); Ace Hardware Commercial (2013–Present); About a Boy (2014–2015); Good Girls (2021)	4356 Wisteria Lane	Katherine Mayfair (2007–2015)
BLDG #7		Walter's House	Around 1987–present	The Burbs (1989); Ace Hardware Commercial (2013–Present); About a Boy (2014–2015); Good Girls (2021)	4356 Wisteria Lane	Felicia Tilman (2016)
BLDG #7		Walter's House	Around 1987–present	The Burbs (1989); Ace Hardware Commercial (2013–Present); About a Boy (2014–2015); Good Girls (2021)	4356 Wisteria Lane	Ben Faulkner (2016-2017)
BLDG #8		The Klopek House	around 1999–present	The 'Burbs (1989); Providence (1999–2002),	4354 Wisteria Lane	Van de Kamp/Hodge family (1994–2017) (House modified since the Burbs)
BLDG #9		Leave It To Beaver House; Morrison Home	1996–present	Leave it to Beaver (1997); Why Him? (2016); Ted (2024)	4352 Wisteria Lane	Young family (1990–2006)
BLDG #9		Leave It To Beaver House; Morrison Home	1996–present	Leave it to Beaver (1997); Why Him? (2016); Ted (2024)	4352 Wisteria Lane	Shepherd family (2006)
BLDG #9		Leave It To Beaver House; Morrison Home	1996–present	Leave it to Beaver (1997); Why Him? (2016); Ted (2024)	4352 Wisteria Lane	Bolen family (2014–2015)
BLDG #10		Cromwell Home		One Desire (1955) Cromwell House; Dragnet; Adam-12; The Car (1977); The 'Burbs (1989)	4350 Wisteria Lane	Martha Huber (?-2004)
BLDG #10		Cromwell Home		One Desire (1955) Cromwell House; Dragnet; Adam-12; The Car (1977); The 'Burbs (1989)	4350 Wisteria Lane	Felicia Tilman (2004–06)
BLDG #10		Cromwell Home		One Desire (1955) Cromwell House; Dragnet; Adam-12; The Car (1977); The 'Burbs (1989)	4350 Wisteria Lane	Alex Cominis (2014-2016) & Andrew Van de Kamp (2014-present)
BLDG #11		Drew House	1977–present	The Nancy Drew Mysteries (1977–78); The 'Burbs (1989)	4346 Wisteria Lane	Rose Kemper (?-2014) on 5.20
BLDG #12		Corner House	1936–present	Three Smart Girls (1936); The Chase (1966); 100 Men and a Girl (1937); Matlock (1986–1995); Mockingbird Lane; The 'Burbs (1989)	4346 Wisteria Lane	Mona Clarke (used as a security house to prevent unauthorised access to the street.)
BLDG #13	Seven Gables House in Colonial Street, film set at Universal Studios, Hollywood.	Seven Gables	1940–present	The House of the Seven Gables (1940)	4344 Wisteria Lane	Unknown Occupants
BLDG #14		Chicken Ranch	1982–present	Best Little Whorehouse in Texas (1982); Father's Day (1997); The Visitor (1997); House of 1000 Corpses (2000); Ghost Whisperer (2005); Mockingbird Lane (2012); About a Boy (2014–2015)	4345 Wisteria Lane	Has only been seen once throughout the entire series.
Circle Drive (the end of Colonial Street with the cul-de-sac)
BLDG #1	Colonial Mansion in Colonial Street, film set at Universal Studios, Hollywood.	Colonial Mansion	1927–2005	Uncle Tom's Cabin (1927); Written on the Wind (1956); Casper (1995)	Area was not seen until season two (2005) when the house was already gone for the show's expansion	
BLDG #1		Park	2005–present	Vacant lot	Wasn't built until season two (2005) of Desperate Housewives; has been a park since season two of Desperate Housewives (2005)	
BLDG #2	Church in end of Colonial Street, film set at Universal Studios, Hollywood.	Church	1964–2005	The Munsters (1964); Murder, She Wrote (1984); Buffy the Vampire Slayer (1999)	Area was not seen until season two (2005) when the church was already gone for the show's expansion	
BLDG #2		Edie Britt's Home	2005–present	Wasn't built until season two (2005) of Desperate Housewives	4362 Wisteria Lane	Edie Britt (2004–2008 and 2013–2014); Renee Perry (2015-)
BLDGS #3, 4, 5, 6		School Facades; Store Facades	unknown-2005	Not known	Area was not seen until season two (2005) when the facades were already gone for the show's expansion	
BLDGS #3, 4, 5, 6		Buble House	2005–present	Wasn't built until season two (2005) of Desperate Housewives	4360 Wisteria Lane	an unnamed woman, played by an uncredited extra, in episode 4.02; Mr. Scully (?-2015) on 7.09

== Productions ==
Numerous TV series and motion pictures have been filmed on Colonial Street, including:

- About a Boy (2014–2015)
- Adam-12
- Angie Tribeca
- Baby Daddy (Season 03, Episode 21)
- Bedtime for Bonzo
- Beethoven
- Best Little Whorehouse in Texas
- Buffy the Vampire Slayer
- The 'Burbs
- Casper (the 1997 prequel)
- Deep Impact
- Delta House
- The Desperate Hours
- Desperate Housewives (2004-2012)
- Father's Day
- The Ghost and Mr. Chicken
- Get a Life (1990-1992)
- Ghost Whisperer
- Gremlins
- The Hardy Boys/Nancy Drew Mysteries
- Harvey
- House of 1000 Corpses
- Kicking and Screaming
- The Ladykillers (the 2004 remake)
- Leave It to Beaver (the original series)
- Leave It to Beaver (the 1997 remake)
- Lucas Tanner
- Malcolm in the Middle (Season 3, episode 3)
- Marcus Welby, M.D.
- Matlock
- The Mick (S2E4)
- Mockingbird Lane (2012)
- The Munsters
- Murder She Wrote
- Never Have I Ever
- The New Lassie
- Parenthood (2010 TV series) (S04e07)
- Providence
- Psycho (the 1998 remake)
- Quantum Leap
- Sabrina, the Teenage Witch
- Send Me No Flowers
- The Shaggy Dog (1959 movie and 1994 TV movie remake)
- Sliders
- So Goes My Love
- Superstore
- Ted 2
- Telenovela (2015-2016)
- The Thrill of It All
- The Visitor (1997 TV movie)
- Written on the Wind
- Why Him?

In addition, some music videos have used the street to shoot scenes:

- Melanie B. - "For Once in My Life"
- Smash Mouth - "All Star"
- The Offspring - "Why Don't You Get a Job?"
- Nelly featuring Kelly Rowland - "Dilemma"
- Diddy featuring Black Rob & Mark Curry - "Bad Boy for Life"
- Boxcar Racer - "There Is"
- Michael Bublé - "It's a Beautiful Day"
- Bring Me the Horizon - "Follow You"

== See also ==
- Wisteria Lane
- RKO Forty Acres
- Courthouse Square

== Bibliography ==
- Sandler, Corey (2006). Disneyland Resort, Universal Studios Hollywood, and Other Major Southern California Attractions Including Disney's California Adventure. Guilford, Conn.: Globe Pequot. ISBN 9780762738724.
- Weaver, Tom; Brunas, Brunas; Brunas, John (2007). Universal Horrors: The Studio's Classic Films, 1931-1946. Jefferson, N.C.: Mcfarland & Co. ISBN 9780786491506.
