= Rex Van de Kamp =

Fictional character on Desperate Housewives

- Steven Culp as Rex
- Portrayed by: Steven Culp; Michael Reilly Burke (unaired pilot)
- Duration: 2004–07, 2009–10, 2012
- First appearance: "Pilot"; 1x01, October 3, 2004
- Last appearance: "Finishing the Hat"; 8x23, May 13, 2012
- Created by: Marc Cherry
In-universe information
- Occupation: Doctor
- Father: Mr Van de Kamp
- Mother: Phyllis Van de Kamp
- Siblings: Few unnamed
- Wife: Bree Van de Kamp (m. 1987)
- Children: Sam Allen; Andrew Van de Kamp; Danielle Van de Kamp
- Grandchildren: Benjamin Van de Kamp (via Danielle and Austin McCann)

Dr. Rex Van de Kamp is a fictional character on the ABC television series Desperate Housewives. He is portrayed by Steven Culp, and is the first and late husband of one of the series' protagonists, Bree Van de Kamp (portrayed by Marcia Cross). Culp was part of the main cast only during the first season due to Rex's death in the season 1 season finale, but made numerous guest appearances for the rest of the series.

== Development and departure ==
Steven Culp was series creator Marc Cherry's first choice for the role of Rex, but he was unavailable when the original pilot was filmed. The role was then offered to Michael Reilly Burke. In June, ABC called for three starring cast members to be recast, Burke included, and Cherry offered Culp the role of Rex again. However, Burke can be seen in the background of some scenes in the final cut of the episode.

Culp was not surprised when his character was killed off, stating that he had a suspicion that someone was going to die in the first-season finale. Producer and writer Kevin Murphy explained the reasoning for killing off Rex: "As we neared the end of season 1, our plan was that each woman would enter a new life chapter, [...] and Bree would become a single woman. We either had to have Rex divorce her or die."

== Storylines ==
=== Backstory ===
Rex Van de Kamp is a doctor, the first husband of Bree, and the father of Andrew and Danielle. Rex and Bree first met while attending Lake Forest College at a meeting of the Young Republicans. In Season 6, it is revealed that Rex had a son that was conceived before Rex had met Bree. This son is named Sam Allen and appears in a multi-episode arc during mentioned season.

=== Season 1 ===
Rex asks Bree for a divorce during the pilot episode, saying that he could no longer "live in this detergent commercial", although the true root of their marital problems lies in Rex's failing to ask his wife to sexually dominate him. Due to Bree's inability to sexually satisfy him, he begins seeing local homemaker and prostitute Maisy Gibbons (Sharon Lawrence). Rex suffers a near-fatal heart attack while having sex with Maisy. When Rex is in the hospital, Bree discovers his affair with Maisy, and she threatens to eviscerate him. After Rex has a second heart attack, the couple decides that they should be nice to one another in the time they have left. Bree starts dating local pharmacist, George Williams (Roger Bart), to hurt Rex, until she and Rex give their marriage another try, and Bree agrees to take part in S&M scenarios with him. The marriage strengthens when Andrew admits he is gay. However, George falls obsessively in love with Bree. George begins tampering with Rex's prescriptions, which leads to Rex have another heart attack. Rex dies thinking Bree has been poisoning him, and in his final moments, he writes Bree a note saying that he understands why she has poisoned him and that he forgives her.

=== Season 2 ===
Rex's funeral takes place during the second-season premiere. Culp himself does not appear, but provided his face for the open casket scene in the season premiere, which saw the producers create a life mask of the actor. Culp returns as Rex in flashbacks in the season finale "Remember". The flashbacks include the Van de Kamps' 1994 move to Wisteria Lane and the first time they meet Mary Alice Young. Another flashback shows Rex and Bree at George's pharmacy in 2001, buying hair dye to get rid of the pink highlights Danielle has put in her hair.

=== Season 3 ===
In "My Husband, the Pig", the sixteenth episode of Season 3, Rex takes over the role of narrating the episode from beyond the grave, instead of Mary Alice Young (Brenda Strong, the regular narrator). The episode focuses primarily on the men of Desperate Housewives (Carlos Solis, Tom Scavo, Mike Delfino, Orson Hodge, and Ian Hainsworth).

=== Season 5 ===
Rex appears in flashbacks in the 100th episode, "The Best Thing That Ever Could Have Happened". When Bree complains about her erratic stove, Rex tells her that he cannot afford to buy her a new one, suggesting that maybe she should get a job of her own. As a reaction to this, Bree begins compiling recipes to make her own cookbook. Rex patronizes Bree, calling her idea foolish. Disheartened, Bree throws away her notes. This conversation is overheard by handyman Eli Scruggs (Beau Bridges), who is in the midst of fixing their sink. Eli later retrieves Bree's notes and returns them to her after Rex's funeral, suggesting that she go ahead with the idea.

=== Season 7 ===
Rex briefly reappears in the season premiere "Remember Paul?" during a flashback, chatting with Carlos.

=== Season 8 ===
Rex returns in "Women and Death" during one of Bree's flashbacks back to how she has a "mask" and will not let Rex know how she feels. Rex gets offended by this and goes to bed. Rex appeared amongst other deceased characters in the series finale, watching over Susan and her family as she leaves Wisteria Lane.

== Reception ==
While reviewing the first-season finale, Frazier Moore of USA Today theorized that Rex's death was a ruse, writing: "Reminder: The audience saw no death scene and no body. When has Desperate Housewives exercised restraint without an ulterior motive?" This theory was proved itself wrong in the second-season premiere. Ann Hodgman of Entertainment Weekly was negative in her review. She wrote that Rex's death did not come as a surprise, noting: "Just as a TV or movie cop is inevitably shot after he announces that he's about to retire, we know it's over for Rex the minute Bree rests her head on his feeble chest and promises him he'll make it."
