= Angie Bolen =

Fictional character on Desperate Housewives

- Desperate Housewives character
- Portrayed by: Drea de Matteo
- Duration: 2009–2010
- First appearance: "Nice is Different Than Good"; 6x01, September 27, 2009
- Last appearance: "I Guess This is Goodbye"; 6x23, May 16, 2010
- Created by: Marc Cherry
In-universe information
- Other names: Angela de Luca (maiden name); Angela Bolen (legal name)
- Occupation: Caterer; Housewife; Environmental activist
- Mother: Rose de Luca
- Husband: Nick Bolen (m. 1991)
- Children: Danny Bolen (via Patrick Logan)
- Grandmothers: Grandma Bombelli (maternal)

Angela Bolen (née de Luca) is a fictional character played by Drea de Matteo on the ABC television series Desperate Housewives. The character was created by television producer and screenwriter Marc Cherry and appeared throughout the series' sixth season from September 27, 2009, to May 16, 2010. Cherry describes Angie as a "loving but tough Italian woman." Her gritty and blunt demeanor contrasts from the domesticated leading characters.

Angie's storylines mostly deal with her family—husband Nick Bolen (Jeffrey Nordling) and son Danny Bolen (Beau Mirchoff)—and their attempts to escape their mysterious past, which is explored throughout the season. Although critics initially welcomed the character as a diverse addition to the cast, they grew frustrated with the slow pace of her storyline as the season progressed. Critics compared Angie to Betty Applewhite (Alfre Woodard), a character whose lagging storyline was slow in developing during the series' second season.

== Development and departure ==
While developing new characters for the sixth season of Desperate Housewives, showrunner Marc Cherry and his writing staff aimed to create a housewife who would be different from the other female characters on the series. Cherry stated that he "wanted someone who didn't seem suburban, who has a tough, blue-collar exterior." The staff ultimately decided upon an Italian New Yorker. Cherry stated that part of his inspiration for the character came from his childhood neighbors. He explained, "When I was growing up in Huntington, Calif., two Italian families from the Bronx moved in across the street. We were so WASPy, so middle American. They had their own ethnic identity. It was an interesting juxtaposition." Cherry insisted that Angie was not replacing the deceased Edie Britt character (Nicollette Sheridan) as a main housewife but would instead be the focus of the season's mystery.

Drea de Matteo, known for her role as Adriana La Cerva on The Sopranos, an HBO television series about the Italian-American Mafia, was immediately offered the role in July 2009. De Matteo did not know the character's name or storyline when she accepted the role. She acknowledged that the character was similar to her previous television roles and admitted that while she initially feared being typecast, she decided to accept the role. She explained, "Now that I am old and don't really care, and remember how much fun I had playing that character — I'd rather be playing a character like that than some straight, normal, non-accented person." The character's name was reported by several media outlets as Angie Vitale following the news of de Matteo's casting.

In November 2009, rumors surfaced that de Matteo was being released from her contract due to budgetary concerns. However, Cherry denied them and the actress appeared in 20 of the season's 23 episodes. However, de Matteo did depart from the series in May 2010 after one season. Cherry explained, "Part of the deal when we hired Drea was she was only interested in doing one season. She has a baby and is eager to get back to her life in New York."

== Personality and characteristics ==
Before the character's debut, de Matteo described Angie as "brassy" and a "liberal New Yorker," which she said contrasts with the more conservative nature of the other characters. She commented that Angie "is less of a housewife than the rest of them. She's a real broad." However, de Matteo also noted that Angie is "not just the brassy smart-talker" and has a vulnerable side, which would be explored in the show. Cherry boosted Angie as "a loving but tough Italian woman ... who will do what she has to protect her family." He also described her as "brilliant" and "shielded," which leaves her largely detached from the other women on the series. Michael Ausiello of Entertainment Weekly described the character as "icy." Entertainment Weekly's Tanner Stransky wrote that Angie was "very real and very gritty," noting that the character was capable "of doing what they need to survive, no matter what the price." Within the series, Bree Hodge (Marcia Cross) describes Angie as blunt and tactless.

== History ==
=== Backstory ===
Angela de Luca lived in New York City with her mother, Rose De Luca (Suzanne Costallos). At age eighteen, she dropped out of college, where she was enrolled as an engineering major, and joined a band of eco-terrorists, led by Patrick Logan (John Barrowman), with whom she became romantically involved. On November 10, 1991, the eco-terrorist group bombed a building that was supposedly empty; however, they unintentionally killed a man named Shawn. Consumed with guilt over having killed an innocent man, Angela agreed to run away with a private investigator (Jeffrey Nordling) who had been pursuing the terrorist group. Later, Angie discovered she was pregnant with Patrick's child. She and the private investigator raised Patrick's son as their own and moved several times, living under various aliases, in an attempt to evade both Patrick and the FBI.

=== Season 6 ===
In the sixth-season premiere, the fugitive couple, now under the aliases of Angie and Nick Bolen, buys a house on Wisteria Lane in Fairview, Eagle State, with their nineteen-year-old son, Danny (Beau Mirchoff). While Angie hesitantly befriends the other women on the street, but when Julie falls into a coma after being strangled, Danny is the prime suspect, thus creating tension between Angie and Julie's mother, Susan Mayer (Teri Hatcher). However, Danny is cleared of all charges when his alibi is validated.

Angie takes a job at the catering company of her neighbor, Bree Hodge (Marcia Cross). Later, Angie learns that Nick had an affair with Julie prior to her attack, but she forgives him for this betrayal. After Danny attempts suicide, Angie and Nick admit him to the hospital. When he awakens with temporary memory loss, he tells Nurse Mona Clark (Maria Cominis), that his name is Tyler and reveals his family's secret. Mona demands $67,000 from the Bolens in return for her silence but is killed by a plane that makes an emergency landing on Wisteria Lane soon after.

Later, Danny begins to date Ana Solis (Maiara Walsh), the niece of Gabrielle (Eva Longoria Parker) and Carlos Solis (Ricardo Antonio Chavira). After Gabrielle and Carlos overhear Angie and Nick fighting about their secret, they send Ana to a modeling academy in New York for her safety. Danny follows Ana without his parents' knowledge. Angie and Gabrielle travel to New York to bring Danny home and Angie confesses her past to Gabrielle. Patrick tracks Angie back to Fairview, where he hits Nick with his car. While Nick is in the hospital, Patrick moves into the Bolen home and takes Angie and Danny hostage and forces Angie to build him a second bomb. He plants the bomb inside the house and activates it with a detonator from down the street. However, the bomb in the house was a decoy; Angie had planted the actual bomb in the detonator. Patrick dies in the explosion and Angie and Nick, still on the run from the FBI, relocate to Atlanta, Georgia while Danny moves to New York.

== Reception ==
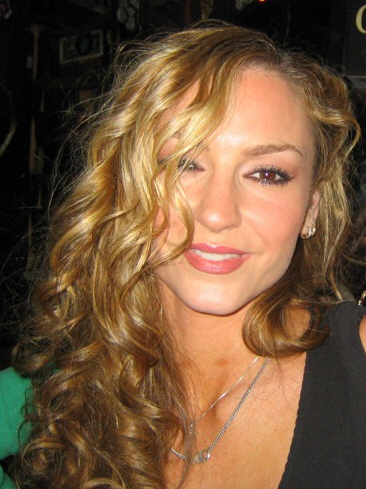
Drea de Matteo's performance was well received by critics, although her character's storyline was criticized for moving slowly.

Both Drea de Matteo's performance and the Angie character received positive reviews upon the season premiere. Stransky said "it's great to see Drea de Matteo back on screen" and praised the contrast between Angie and the other characters. In her review of the season premiere, Isabelle Carreau of TV Squad called the character promising. TV Guide's Mickey O'Connor noted that the chemistry between Angie and the other characters was "a little off," but predicted it would improve throughout the season. Four episodes into the season, Ken Tucker of Entertainment Weekly declared that Angie's storyline was suffering from the lack of interaction between the character and the other leading women, similar to the Betty Applewhite (Alfre Woodard) storyline of season two.

By the middle of the season, Gael Fashingbauer Cooper of MSNBC complained that the Angie storyline was lagging, opining that the revelation that Angie is an eco-terrorist "sounds like a plot summary dreamed up by The Onion wanting to spoof the ultimate suburban show." Stransky declared that he was "tired of even wondering what's up with the Bolens," as their "who-cares-anyway mystery" storyline continued to move too slowly. However, his interest in the storyline was renewed when John Barrowman joined the show as Patrick Logan, stating that the storyline had "finally gotten hotter and, subsequently, better." Stransky praised the "sweet vendiction" of the conclusion to Angie's storyline in the season finale. Cooper also enjoyed the conclusion of Angie's storyline, scoring her plot in the season finale with a 'B.' She wrote that de Matteo "brought some needed fire and Italian backbone to a very bland street" and was disappointed that the character was written off the series. However, Robert Bianco of USA Today dismissed the finale's devotion to resolving the Bolen family storyline, stating that the audience and other characters were not invested enough in the Bolens to care about their life-threatening predicament or departure. Following the announcement of de Matteo's departure, Ausiello reported that fans had not "warmed to" the character of Angie.
