= Pilot (Desperate Housewives) =

- Desperate Housewives episode
- Lynette, Gabrielle, Susan, and Bree celebrate the life of Mary Alice, their departed neighbor and friend.
- Episode no.: Season 1 Episode 1
- Directed by: Charles McDougall
- Written by: Marc Cherry
- Production code: 101
- Original air date: October 3, 2004
- Running time: 43 minutes

Guest appearances
- Christine Estabrook as Martha Huber; Doug Savant as Tom Scavo; Joy Lauren as Danielle Van de Kamp; Shawn Pyfrom as Andrew Van de Kamp; Brent Kinsman as Preston Scavo; Shane Kinsman as Porter Scavo; Zane Huett as Parker Scavo; Sherica Durdley as Wendy; Nike Doukas as Natalie Klein; Heath McCall as Waiter; Kay Wade as Elderly Lady; Edward Zoellner as Tanaka Party Waiter

Episode chronology
← Previous —	Next → "Ah, But Underneath"
- Desperate Housewives season 1

"Pilot" is the first episode of the American dramedy-mystery series Desperate Housewives. It premiered on October 3, 2004, on the ABC network. It was written by series creator Marc Cherry and directed by Charles McDougall. The pilot introduces the residents of the suburban neighborhood of Wisteria Lane. Following the suicide of an outwardly successful neighbor, her friends begin to deal with the problems in their personal lives. Susan Mayer (Teri Hatcher) competes for the attention of a new plumber who has moved across the street; Bree Van de Kamp (Marcia Cross) struggles with her failing marriage and ungrateful family; Gabrielle Solis (Eva Longoria) continues an affair with her sixteen-year-old gardener; and Lynette Scavo (Felicity Huffman) copes with life as a stay-at-home mother of four.

Cherry conceived the idea for the series while watching coverage of the Andrea Yates murder trials, and was fascinated by how women lead lives of quiet desperation. He began writing the script in 2002 and pitched it to several networks throughout the following year. In October 2003, ABC announced that it had picked up the pilot. Casting began in February 2004 and filming took place the following month primarily on the Colonial Street backlot set at Universal Studios. According to Nielsen ratings, the episode was watched by 21.6 million viewers on its original American broadcast, becoming the most-watched program of the week. The pilot received critical acclaim, with critics complimenting the series' tonal diversity. The cast, particularly the four leads and Sheridan, also received praise. The episode won various awards, including three Emmys.

== Plot ==
Desperate Housewives focuses on the lives of several residents of the fictitious street of Wisteria Lane. The suburban neighborhood is shocked by the suicide of Mary Alice Young (Brenda Strong), who seems to have led an ideal domestic life. Mary Alice's close friends, Susan Mayer (Teri Hatcher), Lynette Scavo (Felicity Huffman), Bree Van de Kamp (Marcia Cross), and Gabrielle Solis (Eva Longoria), struggle to come to terms with the news. Later, Mary Alice's son, Zach (Cody Kasch), awakens in the middle of the night to find his father, Paul (Mark Moses), unearthing a mysterious chest from the drained swimming pool in their backyard.

Susan, a divorced mother, takes interest in Mike Delfino (James Denton), a plumber who has recently moved to Wisteria Lane; however, she faces competition with neighbor Edie Britt (Nicollette Sheridan), a promiscuous serial divorcée. Suspicious that Mike is spending the night with Edie, Susan enters Edie's home uninvited with the pretense of borrowing sugar. While inside, she accidentally knocks over a candle, which sets fire to the entire house. Susan flees the scene, leaving behind her glass measuring cup. Though wracked with guilt, Susan is relieved to learn that Mike was not the man with whom Edie was fornicating. Meanwhile, Lynette, a former career woman, is frustrated with raising four young children while her husband, Tom (Doug Savant), is constantly away on business.

Bree, a perfectionist homemaker who feels unappreciated by her family, is troubled when her husband Rex (Steven Culp) asks for a divorce. She poisons him by mistakenly putting onions, to which he is deathly allergic, in his salad. At the hospital, Rex accuses Bree of being emotionally unavailable and obsessed with achieving domestic perfection. Elsewhere, Gabrielle, a former model, grows increasingly unhappy with her marriage to Carlos (Ricardo Antonio Chavira), who buys her love with extravagant gifts. She continues an affair with her sixteen-year-old gardener, John Rowland (Jesse Metcalfe).

Paul asks Susan, Lynette, Bree, and Gabrielle to sort through Mary Alice's belongings, as he cannot bear to do so himself. In a box of Mary Alice's clothes, the women discover a blackmail note reading "I know what you did[.] It makes me sick[.] I'm going to tell[.]" The postmark indicates that Mary Alice received it the day she killed herself and the women begin to wonder what secret their friend could have been keeping.

== Production ==
=== Creation and development ===
I always envisioned [my mother] as the perfect wife and mother. The idea that she had a period in her life when she was miserable was astounding to me. I suddenly realized that if my mother could be desperate in the life she had chosen for herself, any woman can.

— Marc Cherry, USA Today

In 2002, Marc Cherry was in a precarious financial situation and was having trouble finding a job. He commented, "I was broke, unable to get even an interview for a writing job, and seriously concerned about my future. I had just turned forty and was starting to wonder if I was one of those deluded writers that wander around Hollywood, convincing themselves they're talented when all the evidence points to the contrary." While watching television coverage of the Andrea Yates trials with his mother, Cherry turned to her and asked, "Can you imagine being so desperate that you would do that to your children?" to which his mother replied, "I've been there." Cherry was intrigued by the idea that a "perfectly sane, rational woman could have the life she wanted, being a wife and mother ... and still have moments of insanity;" he began writing the pilot episode soon after. Cherry originally developed the concept as a half-hour comedy. However, after his agent was arrested for embezzlement, Cherry signed with Paradigm Talent Agency, where he was advised to rewrite the script as a soap opera. Cherry completed the first draft of the pilot in April 2002 and pitched the script to CBS, NBC, Fox, HBO, Showtime, and Lifetime, all of which turned it down.

Following script rewrites, Cherry pitched the series to ABC, who picked up the pilot. ABC executives were, however, concerned about the title of the series, which Cherry had selected before even writing the script. They suggested renaming the series Wisteria Lane or The Secret Lives of Housewives, but Cherry insisted on keeping the original title. He later commented, "I put 'desperate' [into the title] to try to indicate, however subtly ... I'm going to have some fun with the imagery, to take it to some interesting places. Most critics got the joke. Some people see the word 'housewives' and it pushes a button in them and they seem to lose all reason." The project was officially announced on October 23, 2003, as a cross between American Beauty and Knots Landing. While Desperate Housewives, along with fellow new series Grey's Anatomy and Lost, would later help reverse ABC's flagging fortune, network executives Lloyd Braun and Susan Lyne were fired shortly after greenlighting these risky and expensive pilots.

=== Casting ===
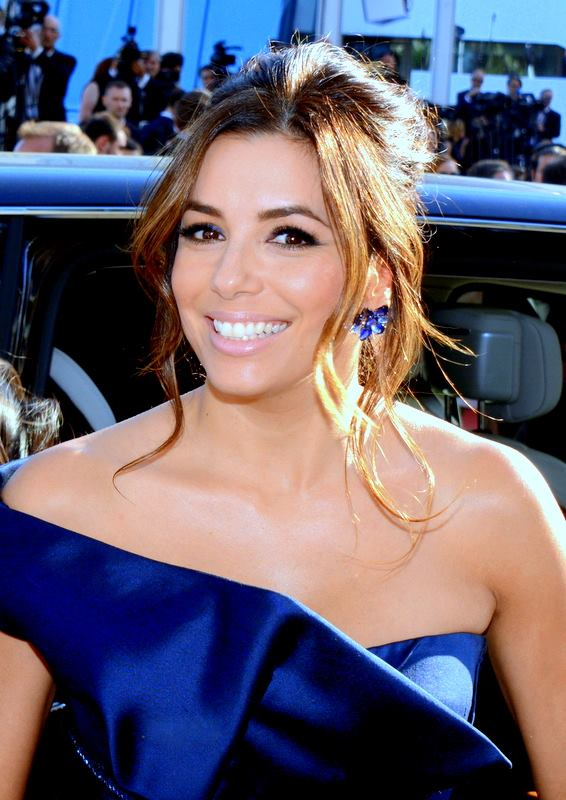
Eva Longoria was the first actor cast in the pilot. She auditioned for the project without having read the entire script.

Casting for Desperate Housewives began in February 2004. Director Charles McDougall reported seeing around 150 "very good and determined women" audition for the four leads. Eva Longoria was the first actor cast in a lead role, landing the role of Gabrielle Solis, a materialistic ex-model, after two auditions. Longoria, an unknown soap opera actress at the time, stated that prior to her audition, she had not read the entire script. She recounted, "Marc Cherry asks, 'So what did you think of the script?' like the whole thing. And I said, 'Well I didn’t read the script. I only read my part.' And Marc Cherry goes, 'I knew you were Gabrielle at that moment because it was such a Gabrielle thing to say.'" Roselyn Sánchez also auditioned for the role. Teri Hatcher was cast in the role of Susan Mayer, a single mother looking for love, after a second audition for ABC network executives. Cherry commended Hatcher's audition, calling it "the best audition I've ever seen in network [television]." Actors originally considered for the role include Courteney Cox, Calista Flockhart, Mary-Louise Parker, and Sela Ward. Julia Louis-Dreyfus also expressed interest in the role, but network executives felt she was not right for the part.

Cherry offered the role of Bree Van de Kamp, a "perfect homemaker" reminiscent of The Stepford Wives, to Dana Delany three times. Delany rejected the role, as it was too similar to her character on Pasadena, but would later join the series in its fourth season as Katherine Mayfair. Marcia Cross was later cast as Bree. Roma Downey, Jeri Ryan, and Stacey Travis were also considered for the role, while Nicollette Sheridan auditioned for the part and was cast as neighborhood tramp Edie Britt instead. On her audition, Sheridan recalled, "At the end of the reading, the director looked at me and said, 'No, no, I see you as Edie.' I said, 'Oh, I see, I come in a housewife and mother of two and leave the slut.'" The Edie character was originally intended to be a small role, but it was expanded once Sheridan was cast. Felicity Huffman was cast as Lynette Scavo, a frustrated stay-at-home mother of four, after talking about her own experiences as a mother during her audition. Cherry called Huffman's casting "very lucky," commenting that "within fifteen minutes she had the part." Alex Kingston read for the role of Lynette, and has since alleged that she was denied the role for being too heavy. The role of series narrator Mary Alice Young was given to Sheryl Lee. Cross originally auditioned for the role before being cast as Bree instead. Jeanne Tripplehorn and Heather Locklear also auditioned for leading roles.

Ricardo Antonio Chavira was cast as Gabrielle's wealthy and condescending husband, Carlos Solis. Kyle Searles joined the cast as John Rowland, the Solis’ teenage gardener with whom Gabrielle is having an affair. Andrea Bowen was hired to play Susan's teenage daughter, Julie, while James Denton was cast as Susan's love interest and new neighbor, plumber Mike Delfino. Mark Moses was cast as Paul, Mary Alice's mysterious husband, and Cody Kasch as their troubled teenage son Zach. Michael Reilly Burke was cast as Bree's sexually dissatisfied husband, Rex Van de Kamp. The pilot also introduced several recurring cast members. Christine Estabrook appeared as nosy neighbor Martha Huber, a role originally intended for an Asian American actress. Doug Savant made his first appearance as Tom, Lynette's husband who is always away on business. Savant later became a series regular for the second season, a promise Cherry made to him when he signed on for the first season. Shawn Pyfrom and Joy Lauren each made their debut appearances as Andrew and Danielle Van de Kamp, Bree's defiant teenage children. Cherry stated that casting the two roles was difficult because of their limited involvement in the first few episodes of the series. Additionally, Brent Kinsman, Shane Kinsman, and Zane Huett were cast respectively as Preston, Porter, and Parker Scavo, Lynette and Tom's three sons.

=== Filming and subsequent casting changes ===
Filming for the pilot primarily took place on Colonial Street, a backlot street set at Universal Studios Hollywood. This map depicts the layout of the backlot as well as the location of the various characters' homes.

Filming for the pilot was initially intended to take place in an actual Los Angeles neighborhood until the production team realized the difficulties that would ensue. Instead they chose Colonial Street, a backlot street set at Universal Studios Hollywood. The house sets on Colonial Street had been used in numerous film and television productions as early as 1946. Many of the sets, whose styles ranged from contemporary to Victorian to ranch, were remodeled to create a uniform neighborhood. Cherry and production designer Thomas A. Walsh wanted the street to recall the Eisenhower era and convey traditional American values, but appear modern at the same time. Walsh viewed episodes of Father Knows Best, My Three Sons, and Leave It to Beaver, among other television series, to capture the visual style of classic conservative America. Walsh commented, "We were trying to honor that sensibility and at the same time create an everyplace that was neither a red state nor a blue state." Instead, Walsh insisted that the street was in "kind of a pink state. We're somewhere in the middle of America's soul." Refurbishments of the house sets, which included building interior rooms, cost around $700,000. While Walsh strove for a visually unified look for the street as a whole, he carefully designed the interior of each home to reflect the tastes and budgets of the characters.

According to McDougall, another director was originally hired to work on the episode but quit after learning casting would be a group decision. Filming took place over thirteen days in March 2004. During filming, McDougall suggested removing references to pop culture from the script to ensure the pilot had "more of a timeless feel." ABC picked up the series for 13 episodes on May 18, 2004. In June, ABC called for three starring cast members to be recast. Jesse Metcalfe replaced Searles as John Rowland, as producers wanted to add more sexual appeal to the role "to justify why (Gabrielle) was having an affair." Metcalfe had previously read for the role during the initial casting process. The role of Rex Van de Kamp was given to Steven Culp, who was Cherry's first choice for the part but was unavailable when the original pilot was filmed. Brenda Strong took over the role of Mary Alice, as producers thought that Lee was not right for the part. Strong commented on the casting change for her character, explaining, "I think it was a conceptual shift ... There certainly wasn't something wrong with what [Lee] did. It was just that instead of vanilla they wanted chocolate, and I happened to be chocolate." Scenes featuring the original actors were refilmed with their replacements, however Burke and Searles are present in the background of some scenes in the final cut of the episode.

== Release and reception ==
=== Promotion and viewership ===
To promote the series, ABC issued a laundry-themed campaign and purchased advertisement space in magazines such as InStyle and People and on dry-cleaning bags across the country. The show's raciness prompted several advertisers to remove their commercials from the broadcast, but they were quickly replaced. The pilot premiered at 9 pm Eastern Time Zone (ET) on October 3, 2004, one week after its intended broadcast date. The premiere drew 21.6 million viewers and an 8.9 rating/21 share among adults 18 to 49 years of age. It was the highest debut for an ABC series since Spin City in 1996 and for any non-spinoff series since NBC's Inside Schwartz in 2001, as well as the most-watched debut of a drama series in eleven years. The pilot was the most-watched program of the week and also had the highest rating among the demographic of women aged 18 to 49. Additionally, it was the most-watched program among men aged 18 to 34.

In the United Kingdom, the pilot aired on Channel 4 on January 5, 2005, and drew 4.8 million viewers, the highest premiere for a drama series on the network since ER nine years earlier.

=== Critical reception ===
Refreshingly original, bracingly adult and thoroughly delightful, Desperate Housewives is like the answer to a TV prayer you didn't know you'd made. You just know life was much duller before it arrived.

— Robert Bianco, USA Today

The pilot was met with critical acclaim. Robert Bianco of USA Today gave the series premiere four out of four stars, commenting that it was as "involving as any new drama and funnier than any new sitcom [because it] matches high visual style with a witty-but-never arch sensibility." He highlighted the performances of the six leading actresses, writing, "Individually, each is terrific; combined, they're an irresistible feminine force", and praised Hatcher's "revelatory performance." Bianco also noted that Cherry avoided making the pilot campy. The San Francisco Chronicle's Tim Goodman complimented the pilot's tonal diversity while expressing concern that American audiences would "tune in, get freaked out by the scattershot emotional chords and flip over to something safer." However, he praised Cherry's writing as well as the acting, declaring, "There are almost too many things to love in 'Desperate Housewives.'" In his review of the episode, Matthew Gilbert of The Boston Globe commended the episode for its "marvelous tonal elasticity, as it stretches from sharp satire to dishy soap opera to tragique tribute and back again."

Justin Ravitz of PopMatters called the series a "cleverly trashy postmodern soap" and credited it for reviving the soap opera genre, which he felt had disappeared but still suited American culture. He compared the pilot to Sex and the City, declaring it "could potentially replace the departed Sex as the TV Sunday ritual for women and gay men everywhere, although DH is the guiltier pleasure of the two." However, he noted the contrasting tones and dynamics between the two series, and stated that the friendships between Desperate Housewives's four leading women seemed "tenuous," opining, "the sisterly, sugar-swapping connection between the surviving women is superficial, and clearly vulnerable to shifting alliances, acts of betrayal and crowd-pleasing cat-fights." Brian Lowry of Variety called the pilot "oodles of fun." He complimented the cast, stating that while Hatcher provides "the emotional core" of the series, "nearly everyone is intriguing in one way or another," and predicted that Eva Longoria would become the show's breakout star. However, Lowry noted that Desperate Housewives may be "a little too smart for its own good" and expressed concern over the series' "soapy elements." Tom Shales of The Washington Post praised the pilot, assessing, "In visual style, witty language, borderline surrealism and overall mad attitude, [the series] stands on a mountaintop all its own, the best new drama of the season and perhaps the best new comedy, too." He complimented Cross and Hatcher's performances, as well as the writing for the Mary Alice character's narrations. The Futon Critic selected the pilot as the 26th best television episode of 2004.

=== Awards ===
The pilot episode won three Emmy Awards: Outstanding Lead Actress in a Comedy Series (Felicity Huffman), Outstanding Directing for a Comedy Series (Charles McDougall), and Outstanding Single-Camera Picture Editing for a Comedy Series (Michael Berenbaum). Marc Cherry was nominated for Outstanding Writing for a Comedy Series. Berenbaum also won for an American Cinema Editor's Award for his work on the episode. McDougall was also nominated for a Directors Guild of America Award for directing the episode.
