= John Rowland (Desperate Housewives) =

Fictional character on Desperate Housewives

- Desperate Housewives character
- Jesse Metcalfe as John Rowland
- Portrayed by: Jesse Metcalfe
- Duration: 2004–07, 2009
- First appearance: "Pilot"; 1x01, October 3, 2004
- Last appearance: "The God-Why-Don't-You-Love-Me Blues"; 6x04, October 18, 2009
- Created by: Marc Cherry
In-universe information
- Occupation: Restaurant owner; Hotel executive; Gardener
- Father: Bob Rowland
- Mother: Helen Rowland
- Sisters: 1
- Wife: Tammy Rowland (m. 2007; div. 2010)

John Rowland is a fictional character portrayed by actor Jesse Metcalfe and created by television producer and screenwriter Marc Cherry for the ABC television series Desperate Housewives. The character is introduced as the teenage gardener of one of the titular housewives, Gabrielle Solis (Eva Longoria), with whom she cheats on her husband, Carlos Solis (Ricardo Antonio Chavira).

== Development and casting ==
Before Jesse Metcalfe was cast as John Rowland, actor Kyle Searles originated the role in the unaired pilot of the show. In June 2004, ABC called for three starring cast members to be recast. Metcalfe replaced Searles as John Rowland, as producers wanted to add more sexual appeal to the role "to justify why (Gabrielle) was having an affair." Metcalfe had previously read for the role during the initial casting process.

Metcalfe was a regular cast member during the first season. However, after the affair is revealed to Carlos in the first season finale by John himself, Metcalfe left the regular cast. Since his departure, he has made several guest appearances in subsequent seasons.

== Storylines ==
=== Season 1 ===
John Rowland, Gabrielle and Carlos Solis' gardener, is having an affair with Gabrielle. When Mama Solis discovers the truth, she is hit by a car driven by Andrew Van de Kamp before she can show the proof to Carlos. John becomes overwhelmed with guilt, confessing the affair to Father Crowley. The affair is also discovered by his mother, and Gabrielle's neighbor Susan Mayer.

Later, when Gabrielle reveals that she is pregnant, John demands to see Carlos but Gabrielle refuses, explaining to him that Carlos is the father of the child, no matter the paternity. Instead of backing off, John arrives at Carlos's court trial in the season finale and whispers the truth about the affair to him. Carlos goes mad and attempts to attack John, leading to Carlos' arrest.

=== Season 2 ===
After what happened at court in the previous season, Gabrielle breaks up with John. He instead starts having an affair with 41-year-old Joan. Upon finding this out, Gabrielle destroys Joan's garden and shuts John out of her life.

The beginning of Gabrielle's affair with John is first seen in the second season finale in flashbacks. After their first sexual encounter, Gabrielle tells John that this was the only time it would ever happen.

=== Season 3 ===
John is not seen again until early in the third season. He is revealed to be very rich and successful with his gardening company. He is engaged to the daughter of the Sinclair Hotel owner, Tammy Sinclair. John and Gabrielle hook up in this episode, but John explains to her after that he is not planning to risk his marriage by continuing to have an affair with her. He later marries Tammy.

=== Season 4 ===
In the fourth season, John meets Gabrielle at a hotel owned by his father-in-law and realizes that he still loves her. He constantly fights with his wife. He tries to get back with Gabrielle, but she refuses because his wife is pregnant. She also explains that she is married to Victor Lang but is already having an affair with Carlos. Carlos, who eavesdrops, realizes that he is just like how John used to be; he finally forgives him.

=== Season 6 ===
John reappears in the sixth season, set six years after the events of the fourth season. He is divorced from Tammy but managed to get a huge amount of money from the divorce and now owns a restaurant. John sees Gabrielle in the restaurant, along with Carlos, their daughters and their niece, Ana Solis. John is attracted to her and hires her as a waitress.

When Gabrielle sees John dropping her off after work, she is furious with John for flirting with Ana and decides that she will now be picking Ana up from work. Gabrielle then finds out that Ana bought condoms, as she is in love with John, and she goes to the restaurant to tell him to leave Ana alone. John believes that Gabrielle still has feelings for him and kisses her after expressing that he can provide for her now; Gabrielle declines him yet again. Ana sees them kissing. Gabrielle tells her of the affair that happened many years before, and she ends things with John and quits her job.

== Reception ==
John Rowland was viewed as a sex symbol for the show during its first season. John, who USA Today described as "buff 'n' sweaty", became popular with mothers who watched the show and helped Metcalfe become established as "the [show's] hottest sex symbol". Longoria attributed John's appeal to the fact that he was seen shirtless in every episode, also describing him as "a really innocent young kid who hasn't been tainted by the world. And I think that's very endearing to people who watch." While reviewing the first season finale, Ann Hodgman of Entertainment Weekly stated that her interest in the Gabrielle and Carlos storyline was ruined by John telling Carlos about the affair rather than Carlos discovering it himself.
