= Gabrielle Solis =

Fictional character from Desperate Housewives

- Desperate Housewives character
- Portrayed by: Eva Longoria
- Duration: 2004–12
- First appearance: "Pilot"; 1x01, October 3, 2004
- Last appearance: "Finishing the Hat"; 8x23, May 13, 2012
- Created by: Marc Cherry
In-universe information
- Other names: Gabrielle Solis(season 1-3, since season 5); Gaby (usually called throughout series); Gabrielle Márquez (maiden name); Gabrielle Lang (season 3-4); Gabriella
- Occupation: CEO and talk show host Former; Personal shopper First Lady of Fairview; Pageant consultant Housewife; Model
- Mother: Lucía Márquez-Perez
- Stepfather: Alejandro Perez
- Siblings: Unnamed brother Unnamed sister
- Husband: Carlos Solis (m. 2001; div. 2006) (m. 2008); Victor Lang (m. 2007; died 2007)
- Children: Lily Collins-Helm (former adopted daughter); Grace Sanchez; Juanita Solis (legal daughter); Celia Solis
- Other relatives: Ana Solis (ward); Connie Solis; Juanita “Mama” Solis; Milton Lang

Gabrielle Solis (/soʊˈliːs/) is a fictional character portrayed by Eva Longoria on the ABC television series Desperate Housewives. Longoria was nominated for a Golden Globe Award for Best Actress – Television Series Musical or Comedy for her performance.

== Storylines ==
=== Backstory ===
Gabrielle Márquez was born in Las Colinas, Texas. Her family is from Guadalajara, Mexico. Born on October 15, 1975, she has a brother and a sister. Her father died of cancer when she was five years old. She was sexually abused by her stepfather Alejandro Perez (Tony Plana). Her mother, Lucía Márquez (María Conchita Alonso) overlooked the matter, and a nun at her school refused to believe her. When she was fifteen, Gabrielle ran away to New York City to pursue a career in modeling. Gabrielle achieved significant success. She married wealthy businessman Carlos Solis (Ricardo Antonio Chavira), and they then relocated to Wisteria Lane in the fictional suburb of Fairview, Eagle State, where Gabrielle befriended Susan Mayer (Teri Hatcher), Lynette Scavo (Felicity Huffman), Bree Van de Kamp (Marcia Cross), and Mary Alice Young (Brenda Strong).

=== Season 1 ===
Gabrielle is unhappy with her marriage to Carlos, whose priority is work. To keep herself entertained, she has an extramarital affair with John Rowland (Jesse Metcalfe), her teenage gardener.

Gabrielle and John end the affair after Susan and Helen (Kathryn Harrold), John's mother, find out about it. Soon after, Carlos is indicted for importing goods made by slave labor. The government freezes the Solis' bank accounts, forcing Gabrielle to perform low-wage modeling jobs to pay bills.

While Carlos is released on house arrest awaiting his trial, he continually asks Gabrielle for a child, and tampers with her birth control. After Carlos physically forces Gabrielle to sign a post-nuptial agreement, she reignites her affair with John. Later, Gabrielle discovers that she is pregnant and tells John that she will only accept Carlos as the father, regardless of paternity. While Carlos is facing a separate trial for assaulting two different gay men he mistook for being Gabrielle's lovers, John admits to his affair with Gabrielle. Carlos attempts to attack John in court and is subsequently convicted for hate crimes.

=== Season 2 ===
With Carlos now in jail and a child on the way, Gabrielle alienates John and attempts to salvage her marriage. Gabrielle and Carlos continue sparring until she apologizes for the affair wholeheartedly for the first time. Gabrielle hires lawyer David Bradley (Adrian Pasdar).

Later, Caleb Applewhite (Page Kennedy), Betty Applewhite's (Alfre Woodard) son, breaks into Gabrielle's home and chases her. She falls down the stairs, resulting in a miscarriage. Afterwards, Carlos is paroled thanks to the influence of a nun named Sister Mary Bernard (Melinda Page Hamilton). Gabrielle objects to Carlos' attempts to become a better man and intervenes when Carlos attempts to accompany Sister Mary on a charity trip to Botswana. To rid herself of Sister Mary permanently, Gabrielle tells a priest at the church that Sister Mary and Carlos had an affair.

Gabrielle agrees to have a child with Carlos, but her miscarriage leads to complications, forcing them to consider adoption. They prepare to adopt the unborn baby of Libby Collins (Nichole Hiltz). When the baby, Lily, is born, a judge grants Carlos and Gabrielle temporary custody; however, Libby ultimately decides to take Lily back and raise her with her boyfriend. After, their maid Xiao-Mei (Gwendoline Yeo) agrees to be Gabrielle and Carlos' surrogate in order to stay in the country. As the pregnancy progresses, Gabrielle discovers Carlos and Xiao-Mei are having an affair. She kicks Carlos out of the house and informs Xiao-Mei that she is not allowed to leave until the baby is born.

=== Season 3 ===
Six months later, Xiao-Mei nears the end of her pregnancy and Gabrielle and Carlos' are in the midst of their divorce proceedings. When Xiao-Mei gives birth, doctors discover that they had accidentally switched the Solis' embryo with another couples, and theirs was not inseminated. Xiao-Mei moves out, leaving Gabrielle and Carlos childless.

Following the divorce, she teams up with her personal shopper Vern (Alec Mapa) to coach a group of young misfit girls for the Little Miss Snowflake Beauty Pageant. She briefly dates Bill Pearce (Mark Deklin) the widowed father of a girl in the pageant, before realizing that she is not yet ready to date again. Soon after, Zach Young (Cody Kasch), the recently wealthy son of Mary Alice, begins pursuing Gabrielle. Though Gabrielle refuses to date him, she agrees to befriend the irresponsible and disturbed Zach. When Zach proposes to Gabrielle, she rejects him and terminates their friendship.

Later, Victor Lang (John Slattery), a candidate for the mayor of Fairview, takes notice of Gabrielle, and they date casually, but Gabrielle insists that she is not interested. When Gabrielle learns that Carlos has started dating her neighbor, Edie Britt (Nicollette Sheridan), she accepts Victor's marriage proposal. As the wedding draws near, Gabrielle begins to have second thoughts, but goes through with the marriage. After the wedding, Gabrielle overhears a conversation Victor has, admitting to only having married her for his political gain, and starts an affair with Carlos.

=== Season 4 ===
The season premiere, "Now You Know", opens with Gaby and Carlos' plan to run away together on Gaby's wedding night; however, after Edie stages a suicide attempt, Carlos calls off the plan. One month later, Gaby and Carlos reignite their affair despite their commitments to Victor and Edie, respectively. Edie soon becomes suspicious of Carlos and eventually pieces together that he is cheating on her with Gabrielle when she, Carlos, and Victor all come down with crabs. She hires a private investigator, who photographs the couple sharing a final kiss after having just decided to end their affair. Edie shows the photographs to Victor. Victor takes Gabrielle on his boat, where she learns that he has found about the affair. Fearing that he might try to kill her, she knocks him overboard twice (first by herself and then with Carlos' help) and leaves him at sea. Victor survives the ordeal and vows to get revenge on Gabrielle and Carlos. He attempts to kill Carlos during a tornado, only to be killed when he is impaled from behind by a fencepost. In the same storm, Carlos is blinded while the only documents giving him access to an offshore bank account are destroyed. The couple remarries soon after.

While Gabrielle learns to cope with Carlos' blindness, the Solises rent out a room in their house to Ellie Leonard (Justine Bateman) to improve their financial circumstances. Gabrielle later discovers that Ellie is a drug dealer and alerts the authorities; however, after she and Ellie bond, Gabrielle helps her escape before the police arrest her. Gabrielle later discovers several thousand dollars in Ellie's abandoned belongings. Ellie comes back to retrieve it, but Gabrielle tries to keep it from her. When police arrive to the Solis home, Ellie escapes and seeks refuge in Katherine Mayfair's house, where she is shot and killed by Wayne Davis (Gary Cole).

=== Season 5 ===
Five years after the events in season four, Gabrielle has let her looks go, Carlos is still blind, and they are now raising two disobedient daughters, Juanita (Madison De La Garza) and Celia (Daniella Baltodano). The family struggles financially, forcing Carlos to take a job as a masseur at a local country club, which further alienates them from high society. One of Carlos' elderly and wealthy clients, Virginia Hildebrand (Frances Conroy), offers him a job as her personal masseur. Virginia becomes close with the Solis's. Initially, Gabrielle does not mind, as she enjoys the luxuries Virginia provides for them; however, she starts to feel uncomfortable. Virginia revises her will to make the Solis's the sole heirs to her estate, but Gabrielle eventually rejects the offer when Virginia tries to make important decisions in Juanita's and Celia's lives. Later, Carlos regains his sight after having surgery.

Carlos plans to take a job at the community center to help blind people. Tired of struggling, Gabrielle forces Carlos to take a high-salary office job. Meanwhile, Gabrielle works to lose weight and return to her model figure. When Gabrielle discovers that Carlos' new boss, Bradley Scott (David Starzyk), is cheating on his wife, she promises to remain silent so long as Carlos receives a generous salary bonus. Eventually, Bradley's wife, Maria Scott (Ion Overman), finds out about his affair and kills him. As a result of Bradley's death, Carlos is promoted. Later, Gabrielle hesitantly agrees to take in Carlos' teenage niece, Ana (Maiara Walsh), when her grandmother can no longer care for her. Gabrielle attempts to foster a positive relationship with Ana; however, she soon sees how entitled and manipulative Ana is.

=== Season 6 ===
Gabrielle's relationship with Ana becomes more problematic, as Ana shows no regard for the household rules. When Ana starts to work at John's restaurant, he attempts to win Gabrielle back, and Ana quits her job after Gabrielle explains her affair with John to her. Gabrielle also begins experiencing difficulties in her relationship with Juanita. Gabrielle's hot temper gets Juanita expelled from school, and her attempts to home school Juanita only strain their relationship further. Gabrielle and Carlos then enroll Juanita in private school.

Later, Gabrielle discovers that Lynette has been hiding her pregnancy in order to secure a promotion at Carlos' company. Feeling betrayed, Gabrielle ends their friendship, until Lynette saves Celia from being hit by a crashing plane.

When Ana begins dating Danny Bolen (Beau Mirchoff), Gabrielle's relationship with Angie (Drea de Matteo) is complicated, especially when Gabrielle and Carlos discover that the Bolens are keeping a dangerous secret. To break up Ana and Danny, Gabrielle and Carlos send her to a modeling academy in New York; unbeknownst to them or the Bolens, however, Danny follows her there. Gabrielle accompanies Angie to New York to retrieve Danny, during which time she learns about Angie's past. When Patrick Logan (John Barrowman), an environmental terrorist and Danny's real father, holds Angie and Danny hostage, Gabrielle helps rescue them.

=== Season 7 ===
Gabrielle is told the truth of Andrew killing Carlos' mother but decides not to tell Carlos. She finds out later that Juanita is not her real daughter due to a hospital mix-up. Gabrielle wants to meet her true daughter and convinces a lawyer to find the other family. When they meet the family, Gabrielle grows close to Grace, causing jealousy in Juanita, who doesn't know the truth. When Grace's legal parents are discovered to be undocumented immigrants, her legal father Hector is arrested and her legal mother Carmen is forced to go on the run. Since Grace is a citizen, Gabrielle and Carlos agree to take her in to raise her.

To make sure they can get Grace to live with them, Gabrielle turns Grace's legal mother into U.S. Immigration and Customs Enforcement (ICE). She has second thoughts and helps Carmen escape arrest. Later, Gabrielle and Carlos go to pick up Grace, but Carmen insists on keeping her. With Grace gone, Gabrielle struggles with the loss until she goes to therapy, at Carlos's insistence. At the therapist's suggestion, Gabrielle and Carlos go to her hometown, where Gaby gets closure.

When Andrew confesses to Carlos about the hit-and-run, he is furious with Bree for hiding the truth and bans Gabrielle from seeing Bree again. Gabrielle takes her girls and temporarily moves in with Bree but shortly returns to Carlos.

Later, Gabrielle realizes that her stepfather has been stalking her. This horrifies Gabrielle, who thought that he was dead. She eventually confronts him with a gun but lets him go, demanding he never return. During Susan's coming home dinner, Gabrielle runs home to begin preparations for dessert course. Once she enters her house, her stepfather confronts her again, pretending to have her gun. He begins to attack her and attempts to rape her. However, Carlos comes home and intervenes, accidentally killing him. Bree, Susan, and Lynette come into the house and discover the body. With help from Bree, they are able to clean up before the rest of the guests arrive, and all agree to keep the situation secret.

=== Season 8 ===
Gabrielle and Carlos deal with keeping the murder of her stepfather quiet, Carlos unable to be intimate due to his guilt.

Meanwhile, Gabrielle challenges the antagonistic PTA head at Juanita's school after a parking dispute only to accidentally hit the woman with her car. The woman gets revenge by making Gabrielle her replacement. She struggles with leading the PTA, as the members assume her life is "perfect" and she doesn't understand them. However, when a drunken Carlos comes in, the PTA members realize that Gabrielle faces many struggles as well and accept her.

When Carlos gets drunk before work, Gabrielle attempts to cover for him but his boss figures it out. He admits to being a recovering alcoholic himself and urges Carlos to get help, and Carlos checks himself into a rehab center. Susan tells Gabrielle that she discovered Alejandro's stepdaughter, Marisa, was also molested. Gabrielle invites Claudia, Marisa's mother, over and tells her the truth about Alejandro.

When Carlos gets out of rehab, he surprises Gabrielle by having a new altruistic attitude, giving away money. Gabrielle is upset at first but at Mike's funeral, realizes it's better to let Carlos do what makes him happy. When Bree is put on trial for killing Alejandro, both Carlos and Gabrielle want to tell the truth, but Karen McCluskey confesses on the stand to killing Alejandro herself.

In the final moments of the series, it's stated that Carlos helps Gabrielle start her own online shopper company, which earns her a show on the Home Shopping Network. They eventually move to a mansion in Los Angeles where "they argued happily ever after."

== Reception ==
Gabrielle has been generally well received by fans. Aya Tsintziras from Screen Rant called Gabrielle as the best character in the series, praising her character arc as the "biggest" and her change from "a spoiled brat who only cares about hair, makeup, and clothing to a caring mother and friend". She also called Gaby's struggle on whether to have children "interesting" and stated that her children change her outlook on life. Tsintziras also said that Gaby's affair with John "makes sense" due to her feeling "trapped" in her marriage and Carlos not understanding her.

Gabrielle Rockson from The Things called Gabrielle a household name and a "favourite", stating that people loved her "charm, diva attitude, and witty humor". Longoria was nominated for a Golden Globe in 2006 for her performance, and won a People's Choice award in 2007.
