= Mike Delfino =

Fictional character on Desperate Housewives

- Portrayed by: James Denton
- Duration: 2004–12
- First appearance: "Pilot"; 1x01, October 3, 2004
- Last appearance: "Finishing the Hat"; 8x23, May 13, 2012
- Created by: Marc Cherry
In-universe information
- Occupation: Plumber
- Father: Nick Delfino
- Mother: Adele Delfino
- Sisters: Laura Delfino
- Wife: Amy Delfino (m. 1996; died 2003); Susan Mayer (m. 2007; div. 2010) (m. 2014)
- Sons: Zach Young; M.J. Delfino
- Stepdaughters: Julie Mayer
- Granddaughters: Sophie Mayer-Scavo (step)

Mike Delfino is a fictional character on the ABC television series Desperate Housewives. The character is portrayed by James Denton from the show's inception, until the eighth and final season of the show.

== Characterization and casting ==
Marc Cherry observed that the mystery surrounding Mike made him alluring and initially wanted to cast an Italian actor to portray him. Cherry settled with James Denton because he found him wholesome: "We think he's a good guy, and we want him to be a good guy, but he's not acting like a good guy." Mike is introduced as the new neighbor on Wisteria Lane with a mysterious past. Denton explains, "He's on a very personal mission. He's not a cop or a private eye. Mike is there because somebody in his past has done him wrong."

In 2005, Denton stated that he knew his importance to the series was tied to Teri Hatcher and that there was no guarantee he would kept onboard. Denton furthered, “In a perfect world. I'll get four more years out of Desperate Housewives, and then nobody will ever see me again." Denton admitted to not being a fan of the time-skip between seasons four and five before eventually coming around: "I thought it was gimmicky, and even Marc admitted he sort of stole it. But I realized they were right. So that's why I'm not a writer."

In August 2011, ABC president Paul Lee confirmed the eighth season of Desperate Housewives would be the show's last. Denton believed Cherry "had a pretty good feel for when the show was going to end based on the first couple of episodes that felt so much like season one in terms of dealing with the same kind of note from the pilot" and that he personally had a feeling the show was ending before it was officially announced. Denton observed that by the eighth season, "Mike and Susan are pretty secure and If they broke up it would really surprise me. I think it's much more interesting for the writers, now that they've got them together after all these years, to watch them deal with these crazy situations in a realistic way that couples all across the country have to face all the time."

== Storylines ==
=== Backstory ===
Michael "Mike" Delfino was born on January 25, 1966 in Texas as the second child of Adele and Nick Delfino. He was engaged to Deirdre Taylor. He was very popular in high school until his father was arrested and sent to prison for murdering a coworker. Afterwards, his maternal grandfather and mother raised him. During this time, Mike fell into drug addiction and killed a police officer in self-defense while protecting a woman. In 1987, he was sentenced to 66 months in a Kansas prison. In September 1988, his girlfriend Deirdre visited him in prison where they had a conjugal visit, during which she became pregnant with a son, Dana. Deirdre later lied to him that she carried out the abortion and then disappeared from his life. In 1992, he moved to Los Angeles and got married. The woman died in 2003. They had no children but she left him a dog named Bongo. He came to Fairview and was hired by Deirdre's father as a private investigator to find out what happened to Deirdre.

=== Season 1 ===
Mike moves into 4356 Wisteria Lane, renting the Simms' house, and poses as the friendly neighborhood plumber. He is quietly searching for his missing ex-girlfriend (Deirdre Taylor), and during this time, begins a relationship with Susan Mayer.

In the interim, Paul also murders Martha Huber in a fit of rage after finding out that she was responsible for blackmailing Mary Alice, and tries to pin the murder on Mike. Susan temporarily breaks up with Mike when she finds out about his prison time but reconciles with him after meeting with Kendra and Noah, and learning the truth from them.

Mike eventually determines Paul's connection to Deirdre's murder, as revealed in the finale, "One Wonderful Day". He takes Paul hostage, and contemplates killing him, reconsidering when Paul reveals the whole truth about what happened, and realizes that Zach is his biological son. Meanwhile, Zach has taken Susan hostage because he has just found out about the kidnapping.

=== Season 2 ===
Mike returns to Fairview and rescues Susan from Zach. Worried about his relationship with her daughter, Susan secretly encourages Zach to go to Utah, looking for Paul and gives him money. Mike is furious with Susan when he finds out what she did and breaks up with her.

Upon Zach's return, Mike tries getting to properly know him, and Zach is initially interested. Paul, however, takes issue with Zach's obsession with two people who hadn't loved him enough to keep him. Despite Mike's efforts to connect, Zach makes it clear that he views Paul as his father.

After Edie Britt burns down Susan's house, Mike helps Susan get recording equipment so she can get Edie to confess on tape to what happened. By the season finale, Mike decides he wants to marry Susan. However, enroute to meet her, he is run over by Orson Hodge and hospitalized.

=== Season 3 ===
Mike spends the next six months in a coma. When he wakes up, he is diagnosed with retrograde amnesia, with no recollection of the last two years. Edie takes advantage of this to make a move on Mike, lying to him and claiming that Susan had treated him like dirt. Mike enters a relationship with Edie, which ends when she breaks up with him after he is arrested for Monique Polier's murder. Hearing of the arrest, Susan persuades her current boyfriend Ian Hainsworth to help hire a defense attorney for Mike. Paul approaches Mike in jail and engineers an attempt on his life that he "rescues" him from, as a way of getting a favor from Mike. Paul wants Mike to get Zach to visit him and help him find Felicia Tilman (Martha Huber's sister).

Upon Mike's release from prison, he seeks out the help of a hypnotherapist to recover his lost memories. Initially, these efforts are focused on helping him recover his memory of the night Monique died, which help Mike realize that Orson (who has since married Bree Van De Kamp in the six months since the accident) was involved in her death. Mike confronts him on the hospital roof and accidentally knocks Orson over the side. Mike is eventually cleared from charges regarding Monique's death.

Mike is saddened when he finds that Susan has become engaged to Ian, knowing that Mike had intended to propose the night of his accident. Mike challenges Ian at poker game and theybet on their relationships with Susan. Ian wins the bet, and Mike keeps his distance. Following an argument with Ian, Mike consoles Susan and shares a kiss with her, renewing his hope that they would reconcile. He admits to Susan about the poker game. She is furious, refusing to see either of them but eventually deciding to marry Ian. With a broken heart, Mike leaves her a goodbye message and leaves town, unaware that Ian has ended things with Susan. Susan follows him to a national park where he's gone camping but gets lost trying to find Mike on her own. He eventually finds her.

To mark the one-year anniversary of the day Mike originally intended to propose to Susan, they hold an approximation of that night in her driveway, even bringing the trailer that Susan and Julie were living out of at that time. This time, Mike is able to properly propose to Susan. While Susan initially considers going for a big and lavish wedding, she eventually decides otherwise, and she and Mike marry in a small private late-night ceremony, with Julie as their sole witness.

=== Season 4 ===
Shortly after marrying, Susan finds out that she is pregnant, which makes Mike very happy, but problems arise when they have a brief disagreement over whether or not to let Julie attend a party at a house where Mike has seen some rather sketchy behavior. Although Mike respects Susan's decisions about how to raise Julie, he expects her to consult him on how they raise their child. Due to Susan's age, their doctor suggests that they get genetic counseling. In the process, Mike is forced to admit to Susan to the fact that his father is alive and doing life in prison for murder.

During this time, the strain of lingering back pain from his accident plus working overtime to support the baby leads Mike to turn to painkillers, eventually developing an addiction. Bree discovers this when Mike drops a pill in her house. She informs Susan about this, and she confronts Mike after finding that he has a secret stash of pills in his flashlight. Mike throws the pills down the sink, insisting that he's not an addict, but later retrieves them. As his drug dealer is harassing him for money, Mike turns to blackmailing Adam and Orson into prescribing him more. Susan thinks that Mike has stopped taking them, only to find pills in the car. Susan confronts Mike, and in the midst of a heated argument, he accidentally pushes her down the stairs. After getting evaluated at the hospital, she demands he goes to rehab. Mike reluctantly agrees.

Mike misses Susan's first Lamaze class as he is getting his 30 day chip, but is there for the second. While Mike is in rehab, Bree and Orson temporarily move in with Susan and Julie, and Orson's guilt over running Mike over and prescribing him pills leads him to take up sleepwalking. When Julie catches him confessing to the hit and run in one of these episodes, she relays this information to Mike, who in turn tells Susan about this. Susan is furious at Orson, demanding that he stay away from her family, although she comes to forgive Orson with some persuasion from Mike. When Mike's mother Adele comes to town to visit them, Mike scolds her for her attitude towards Susan — asking personal questions and unable to believe that Susan couldn't cook. She apologizes just before Susan gave birth to their baby boy. Mike wants to name him Maynard after his maternal grandfather (who was a father figure for him), but Susan prefers to call him Connor. They eventually settle on naming their son Maynard James Delfino (M.J. for short), honoring both of Mike's grandfathers.

=== Season 5 ===
It is revealed that during the five year time jump, Susan and Mike got into a collision with another car. Although the couple survived, the occupants of the other car--Lila Dash and her daughter Paige--were killed. Mike claimed to the police that he was driving as Susan didn't have her license on her. Despite being found not responsible, as they had the right of way and the Dashes' car pulled out in front of them, Susan blamed herself and Mike, and the trauma took its toll on their marriage, leading to their divorce.

In the present day, Susan is now in a casual relationship with her house painter, Jackson Braddock, whilst Mike begins dating Katherine Mayfair, Susan's friend and neighbor. Mike and Katherine bond over bad dates and realize they are attracted to each other. When Susan finds out that they are dating, it is clear that she still has feelings for Mike. This bad feeling spills over into M.J., when he attacks Katherine by throwing chewed chewing gum at her head. It emerges that this is a result of what Susan told M.J. when she and Mike first split up; that they would get back together eventually.

Worried about her and Mike's relationship, Katherine tells him that her daughter Dylan wants her to move to Maryland, but isn't sure if she should go. Mike is non-committal, but realizes thanks to Edie Britt's husband Dave Williams that he is falling in love with Katherine, and leaves her a basket of roses with a note saying "Don't go". When Katherine finds them, she is thrilled. What neither Mike nor Katherine know is that Dave is actually David Dash, the husband of Lila Dash, and he has come to seek revenge for hers and Paige's deaths. Thinking Mike is responsible, he plans to take Mike and Katherine camping, then gun Katherine down with a sniper rifle and blame it on poachers. Fortunately for Katherine, Edie (who Dave married in order to have a reason to move onto Wisteria Lane) texts him right as he's about to take the shot, having found out the truth about him through investigating. Edie attempts to call Mike to warn him when Dave nearly strangles her. Shaken, Edie rushes out, but crashes her car into a utility pole while trying to avoid Orson and is electrocuted to death. Dave later learns that he nearly killed the wrong person when Susan confesses to him that she was the driver on the night of the accident. As a result, Dave changes his plans and decides that he will murder M.J. to get revenge by proxy.

Mike later struggles with his feelings for Susan and Katherine, and proposes to Katherine, who gladly accepts. In the finale, Dave gives Mike a videotape which he says is rehearsal footage of their band; however, he mistakenly gives Mike one containing a video confession that he wanted Mike to see after M.J. was killed. Needing a videotape to use at the wedding, Katherine puts it in her camera. While waiting at the airport for their flight, Katherine takes her wallet to buy cappuccinos and inadvertently hits the camera, causing Mike to see the confession tape. Realizing M.J. is in grave danger, he abandons Katherine at the airport, and calls Susan (who Dave is taking with M.J. to the place where he intends to kill the latter) to warn her. He speaks to Dave, offering himself in Susan and M.J.'s place. Dave agrees and tells Mike to meet them at the site of the accident. Unknown to Mike, Dave plans to have Mike crash into his car and kill M.J., just as Susan did when she killed Lila and Paige. Susan manages to escape and tries to warn Mike, but he crashes his truck into Dave's car anyway. Fortunately, M.J. survives, as Susan's pleading leads Dave to imagine seeing his dead daughter where M.J. is and prompt him to leave the car. Susan, Mike, and M.J. share a hug, and Mike kisses Susan.

=== Season 6 ===
Mike breaks up with Katherine and decides to re-marry Susan. She accepts and they plan their wedding. Though Susan is happy and in love with Mike, Katherine is devastated and jealous, and their friendship is deeply scarred by this. During the wedding, Katherine approaches Susan and explains how she feels and asks for her to make a public apology during the ceremony under the threat of humiliating her. Susan then locks Katherine in a closet for the duration of the ceremony. Despite this, Katherine breaks out and confronts Mike and Susan after they've tied the knot. Although Susan reluctantly makes a public apology to Katherine, Katherine decides to declare war on her. Although Mike tries to help Susan through this feud, he hits his breaking point when Katherine lies to M.J. that Susan stole Mike away from her. Enraged, Mike verbally blasts her, saying he never loved Katherine and was thinking of Susan the whole time they were together. When a hurt Katherine suggests it'd be less painful for Mike to stab her with a knife, he retorts that he doesn't care enough about Katherine to kill her. After he leaves, Katherine stabs herself with a knife that Mike had touched, and calls the police to implicate Mike. While Mike is in jail, Susan calls up Dylan, and it turns out that Katherine has been lying to her and claiming that she (and not Susan) has been married to Mike. When Dylan confronts her mother, Katherine has a full breakdown and is committed, and Mike is exonerated.

Mike soon runs into financial problems and massive debts, which culminate in his truck getting repossessed. While he refuses any help coming from Susan, he takes a loan from Carlos Solis. Susan eventually learns of their financial ruin and, after going over their finances she and Mike realize they need to cut back significantly. This includes them moving to an apartment across town, and renting out their home. Though Mike knows it will help them get back on their feet, Susan becomes very angry with him as she is forced to leave the house where she raised her children. Though they make up and leave Wisteria Lane, they quickly find a renter for their house. Unbeknownst to them, the renter in question is Paul Young.

=== Season 7 ===
When Susan tells Mike about her lingerie job on the Internet and Paul Young's plan to buy their house, Mike decides to take an oil rig job in Alaska in order to earn more money. He has also been communicating with Felicia Tilman. When Susan develops kidney problems after being trampled during a riot on Wisteria Lane, Mike surprises her at the hospital. They both fear the prospect of Susan succumbing to her disease and so they decide to have an early anniversary which turns into a sham. After everything backfires Mike admits he's not ready to lose Susan and tells her that she'll find a kidney donor. After Paul recovers from a shooting, he asks for Mike's help in finding Zach. Mike rejects but later changes his mind when he realizes that Zach is on drugs. Both Mike and Paul visit Zach and ask him to go to rehab. When Susan gets a kidney, courtesy of Paul's new wife Beth committing suicide, they both cannot wait for their sex drought to end with Susan dreaming of having sex but cannot recall her male counterpart.

=== Season 8 ===
Making the fatal mistake of crossing Donny, an unruly and vengeful loan shark/extortionist who harasses Renee, Mike is killed in a drive-by shooting by Donny himself in front of his home on Wisteria Lane, just seconds after expressing his love toward Susan. He pushes Susan down to the ground in order to save her while he is shot in the chest, dying at the age of 51. He is then remembered by the housewives at his funeral. The fate of Mike's killer is never shown afterwards, but Bree is later told that an arrest had been made. When Susan is cleaning out Mike's closet, she finds papers indicating that Mike was writing checks to a woman. Susan visits the address she finds in Mike's possessions and discovers that Mike had a sister, Laura, whom he only learned about eight years before as Adele did not want to be "inconvenienced" by their special needs child. In the final moments of the series, as Susan leaves Wisteria Lane, Mike is among the spirits watching her go.

== Reception ==
Screen Rant ranked Mike's death as the most emotional of the series, and added that the "fact that Mike's ghost is looking on as Susan says goodbye to Wisteria Lane makes this even more tragic and beautiful." When they ranked the seasons of the series, Screen Rant cited "the pointless decision to kill off Mike Delfino so close to the show's end" as the reason the eighth season lost major points. Christina Tran wrote that she was still in denial about Mike's death even after knowing it would happen due to her fondness for the character: "Aside from the core four, Mike was the last person I wanted to see go."
