= Carlos Solis =

Television fictional character

- Ricardo Chavira as Carlos Solis
- Portrayed by: Ricardo Chavira
- Duration: 2004–2012
- First appearance: "Pilot"; 1x01, October 3, 2004
- Last appearance: "Finishing the Hat"; 8x23, May 13, 2012
- Created by: Marc Cherry
In-universe information
- Occupation: Counselor; Massage therapist President of Mergers and Acquisitions
- Parents: Juanita "Mama" Solis (mother; deceased); Diego Solis (father; deceased); Lucía Márquez-Perez (mother-in-law); Mr Márquez (father-in-law; deceased); Alejandro Perez (step-father-in-law; deceased)
- Siblings: Unnamed brother-in-law (via Gabrielle); Unnamed sister-in-law (via Gabrielle)
- Wife: Gabrielle Solis (m. 2001; div. 2006) (m. 2008)
- Children: Lily Collins-Helm (former adopted daughter); Grace Sanchez; Juanita Solis (legal daughter); Celia Solis
- Other relatives: Ana Solis (niece/former ward); Connie Solis (aunt)

Carlos Solis (/soʊˈliːs/) is a fictional character portrayed by Ricardo Chavira on the ABC television series Desperate Housewives. He is, for most of the series, the husband of Gabrielle Solis, portrayed by Eva Longoria.

== Past ==
Carlos was born on July 15, 1971, in Guadalajara, Mexico to Juanita and Diego Solis. His father beat both Carlos and his mother so she told him that his father left them for a waitress in El Paso, but Juanita told Gaby that when Diego beat Carlos when Carlos was 4, "she made sure that Diego Solis never hurt her son or her ever again". It is implied that Juanita murdered Diego to protect Carlos and herself from his domestic violence.

Carlos entered college on a golf scholarship. He soon started a successful career in finances. While at a fashion show, he met Gabrielle. He proposed to her on their third date. He wanted her laugh to be with him for the rest of his life. Juanita didn't like her at all but Carlos made her at least accept Gaby as her daughter-in-law. However, she managed to force Gaby to sign a prenuptial agreement.

In 2003 they both moved to Fairview, to 4349 Wisteria Lane, where they met Mary Alice Young, Bree Van de Kamp, Lynette Scavo and Susan Mayer. He wanted his wife to be happy so he told her to go make friends with the local women. However she managed to be friends with a local, shy boy, Eddie Orlofsky. When he found out about it, Carlos told Gaby to cut him loose.

== Overview ==
=== Season 1 ===
Carlos wants a family so much that he replaces Gaby's birth control pills with sugar pills as she was against the idea. He's arrested for illegal business practices, takes a plea bargain, and serves eight months in jail; separately, he gets tried for hate crimes against two gay men who he thought were sleeping with Gabrielle. In reality, she is sleeping with John Rowland, their teenage gardener. John tells Carlos that he beat up the wrong guy, causing Carlos to attack him and be convicted of the hate crimes. Gabrielle originally refuses to get him off doing extra time after finding out he messed with her birth control, but makes him promise to take care of the baby in exchange for her testimony.

=== Season 2 ===
After the loss of the baby, Carlos gets early parole from a program for Catholic inmates. Through the program, Carlos meets a nun, Sister Mary Bernard, who inspires him to live a more religious life. Following her miscarriage, Gaby tells Carlos that she did want children but she wanted Carlos to want her for her, not just because she was capable of childbearing.

Sister Mary invites Carlos to accompany her to Botswana, and he agrees initially. When he goes to the doctor in preparation for the trip, he leaves Gabrielle to fill out a form for him. She neglects to mention his allergy to eggs, resulting in Carlos suffering an allergic reaction to a vaccine, forcing him to stay in Fairview. While delirious, he talks about Sister Mary in a very unreligious way, which Gabrielle reports to Father Crowley. He has Sister Mary transferred, but not before she and Gabrielle have a fight.

In the season finale, Gabrielle initially thinks Carlos has died but discovers that he has paid the gardener, Ralph, to do his community service and Ralph was hit by a car. She also discovers Carlos is having an affair with the maid/surrogate, Xiao-Mei.

=== Season 3 ===
In the third season opener, Gabrielle and Carlos decide to divorce but it is complicated, due to the baby that their surrogate, Xiao-Mei, is expecting. However, Xiao-Mei goes into labor on Bree & Orson's wedding day and gives birth to a black baby. The doctor admits that the embryos were accidentally switched and their embryo didn't take, simplifying the divorce. However, it gets nasty and takes a hostage situation at a supermarket to make them realize what they had turned into. Carlos' attempt to stop scheming have limited success. He moves in with Mike Delfino, taking advantage of Mike's amnesia by claiming that they were best friends. He also begins dating again although he and Gaby still have feelings for each other.

He bonds with little Travers McLain after finding Travers wandering outside late at night. Spending time with him and his mother, Edie Britt, reignites his desire for children. Carlos and Edie begin dating but keep it secret. However, when Carlos tells her that he doesn't want Gaby to know, Edie thinks he's still in love with her and tells Gabrielle, prompting Gaby to say that she was unhappy with Edie and Carlos dating but Edie ignores her. Carlos removes Gaby from Travers' party when he sees her making a scene. The resulting argument makes Gaby realize Carlos is still in love with her.

Edie's ex-husband, Charles, eventually comes to collect Travers and Edie speaks to a lawyer about shared custody, suspecting Carlos is losing interest. Charles and Edie argue, with Edie threatening to go for full custody. Carlos talks her out of it, convincing her to think of Travers' best interests, which are to stay with Charles. For the sake of Travers, he agrees to commit with Edie, not to let her feel lonely and in need of a family; this makes her call off the custody. Edie is upset by Carlos laughing at the idea of getting married so she asks him to move in, but he refuses, having signed a lease with Lillian Simms. Determined to make Carlos move in with her, she visits Lillian and lies about Carlos so Lillian cancels the lease and Edie offers him a place to stay. Carlos figures out what really happened and confronts Edie, who guilts him into staying. When Edie suggests they try for a baby, Carlos agrees, not knowing that Edie is still taking birth control pills. When he finds out, he dumps her, prompting her to attempt suicide in the season finale.

=== Season 4 ===
In the fourth season, Carlos returns home to find Edie hanging. It emerges that she faked her suicide attempt. She narrowly escapes with her life, as Carlos notices her when Karen McCluskey complains to him about the garbage cans but sees something in Edie's bedroom window. Edie uses her suicide attempt and knowledge of Carlos' finances to make him stay but Carlos is resistant. She takes it further by proposing marriage under the threat of telling the IRS about his offshore bank accounts, so Carlos agrees but quietly moves the money.

Edie figures out that Carlos is sleeping with Gabrielle when she, Carlos, and Victor come down with crabs. Edie hires a private detective to spy on Carlos, and gets pictures of him and Gabrielle sharing a passionate kiss. She also tells the IRS about the account, but they tell her that the account doesn't exist. Meanwhile, Carlos breaks up with Edie, while Gabby breaks up with Victor over a voicemail. Carlos goes to see Gabrielle and she tells him that Victor tried to kill her while out at sea, so she knocked him overboard. They go back to get him and when they do, Victor and Carlos fight. Victor goes to stab Carlos and Gabrielle knocks Victor overboard again. When they look for him, they can't see so Gabrielle decides to frame it as suicide and let the boat go out to sea.

Carlos wants to go the police, but Gaby stops him. However, Victor is found alive. He claims to have amnesia and has forgotten what had happened on the boat, but when alone with Gaby, he threatens her, declaring that he remembers everything. Gaby and Carlos plan to flee town, but Victor attempts to kill Carlos as a tornado bears down on Wisteria Lane. He runs out into the storm and Victor follows, but Victor is killed when impaled by a flying fence post. Carlos is hit on the head, rendering him unconscious and blind. Carlos lies to Gaby that his sight will return, but Gaby learns the truth when Edie congratulates her for accepting the lifelong task of caring for a disabled husband. Gaby is upset that Carlos lied but he explains that he was worried that she would not marry him, had she known the truth. Gaby tells Carlos that she is with him "for better or worse."

==== Five-year jump ====
Carlos and Gaby have two daughters, Juanita and Celia Solis. Carlos is still blind and they have lost their wealth and the status that goes with it. Carlos works as a massage therapist in a country club.

=== Season 5 ===
Five years after Season 4, Carlos' life has changed dramatically. Despite medical doubts, Gaby unexpectedly has gotten pregnant twice. While Carlos views Gaby's pregnancies as "miracles", she was less enthusiastic and worried about money. Carlos became a massage therapist to keep them afloat. Early in the season, Carlos learns that his sight can be restored. He happily anticipates seeing his wife for the first time in years and his daughters for the first time. Gaby, however, is worried that he won't recognize her and find her unattractive. When his sight is restored, Carlos finds his daughters and wife beautiful and notices that Gabrielle sold nearly all her valuable belongings to support their family. He eventually takes a high-paying business job so he could give Gabrielle and his daughters financial security.

In episode 17, Carlos becomes president of the company he was working at, due to the death of Bradley Scott. Later in this episode, he hires Lynette Scavo.

In the season finale, Aunt Connie claims she is dying and needs someone to care for her granddaughter, Ana. Carlos agrees, to pay back the aunt who did so much for him, despite Gaby's protests. Ana seems nice but is a schemer who can get guys to do what she wants by flirting.

=== Season 6 ===
Two months have passed and Carlos and Gaby continue to look after his niece, Ana. While Gaby complains about Ana's bad behavior, Carlos is more sympathetic and urges his wife to sign the papers that would make them Ana's legal guardians. Eventually, Gaby agrees. Lynette tells him she is pregnant and he makes her choose - her job or her family. When Lynette threatens to sue, Carlos responds by giving her an impossible amount of work to do in one night and when she couldn't complete it, fires her for incompetence. However, he rehires her after she saves Celia from an out of control airplane and she agrees not to sue.

However, one evening, Carlos finds Danny and Ana fooling around and attacks Danny. Angie overhears Carlos threatening her son and comes running, throwing a vase against the wall and proves that she is just as strong-willed as Carlos, who releases Danny. When he and Gaby try making amends, they overhear her and Nick arguing about her shaded past.

=== Season 7 ===
Carlos discovers that Juanita is not their real daughter, but hides it from Gaby, afraid that it will hurt her. When Gaby eventually finds out, they go out to look for her real daughter, Grace. After first meeting her, they see Grace throwing a tantrum over an expensive jacket and know that Grace is Gaby's real daughter. They also find out that her parents are illegal immigrants, though Grace (being born in the United States) is a citizen. Her father gets arrested after failing to show a valid driver's license to the police, leaving Grace's non-biological mother to go in hiding. Even though Gaby and Carlos try multiple times to take in Grace at her house, Grace's non-biological mother insists she stay with her. He supports Gaby when she goes into therapy after she begins to lose it, and later goes to Gaby's hometown with her to confront her former stepfather who is now dead, but instead, Gaby sees a teacher who she confided in and didn't believe her, causing to Gaby to tell the woman she should feel ashamed and not her. They leave the town and Gaby puts the past behind her.

When Andrew seeks rehab for drinking, he decides to come clean to Carlos about running over his mother. Bree and Gaby both try to stop him and when Carlos invites Andrew to a camping trip, they suspect the worst. They chase Carlos to the woods and when they see him with a bloody towel and dirty shovel, Bree blurts out what Andrew did just before her son returns. Carlos is outraged, not only with Andrew but with Bree and Gaby for hiding the truth. He tries to force Andrew to drink in his mother's memory and walks out of the cabin. Andrew, Bree, and Gaby find him at his mother's grave as Andrew talks to him about what happened and Carlos decides to forgive him. When Bree comes to thank him, however, Carlos coldly says that he can't forgive her, knowing the truth all these years and hiding it from him, and tells Bree their friendship is over. This changes, however, after Carlos kills Gaby's stepfather, who returned to Wisteria Lane and was tormenting her. The two appear to have reconciled after Bree agreed to not say a word to anybody.

=== Season 8 ===
The first episodes of the season depict Carlos trying to overcome the guilt for killing Alejandro. Because of this, he starts drinking. After a number of incidents, Carlos decides to go to rehab. While in rehab, he discovers that what counselors do has much more impact on people's lives and is more helpful than his own position as a business executive. For this reason, Carlos decides to become a counselor himself after coming out from rehab, resigning to his post as director. At first, he faces opposition from Gaby, but she eventually supports him and finds a job herself as personal shopper. Gaby's job turns out to be better paid than Carlos', and he starts to feel uncomfortable with the idea of Gaby playing the family provider role.

When it turns out that Bree may face 20 years to life sentence, both Carlos and Gaby are about to confess that they committed Alejandro's murder; in the end, Mrs. McCluskey herself confesses she committed the murder, after overhearing a conversation between Carlos and Gaby, and is left without charges due to her advanced age and health condition.

It is revealed at the end of the finale that Carlos helped Gaby to start an online shopper company, which eventually leads to her becoming a host in her own talk show. Carlos and his family leave Wisteria Lane one year after the events of the series finale, and move to a mansion in Los Angeles.
