= Ricardo Chavira =

American actor

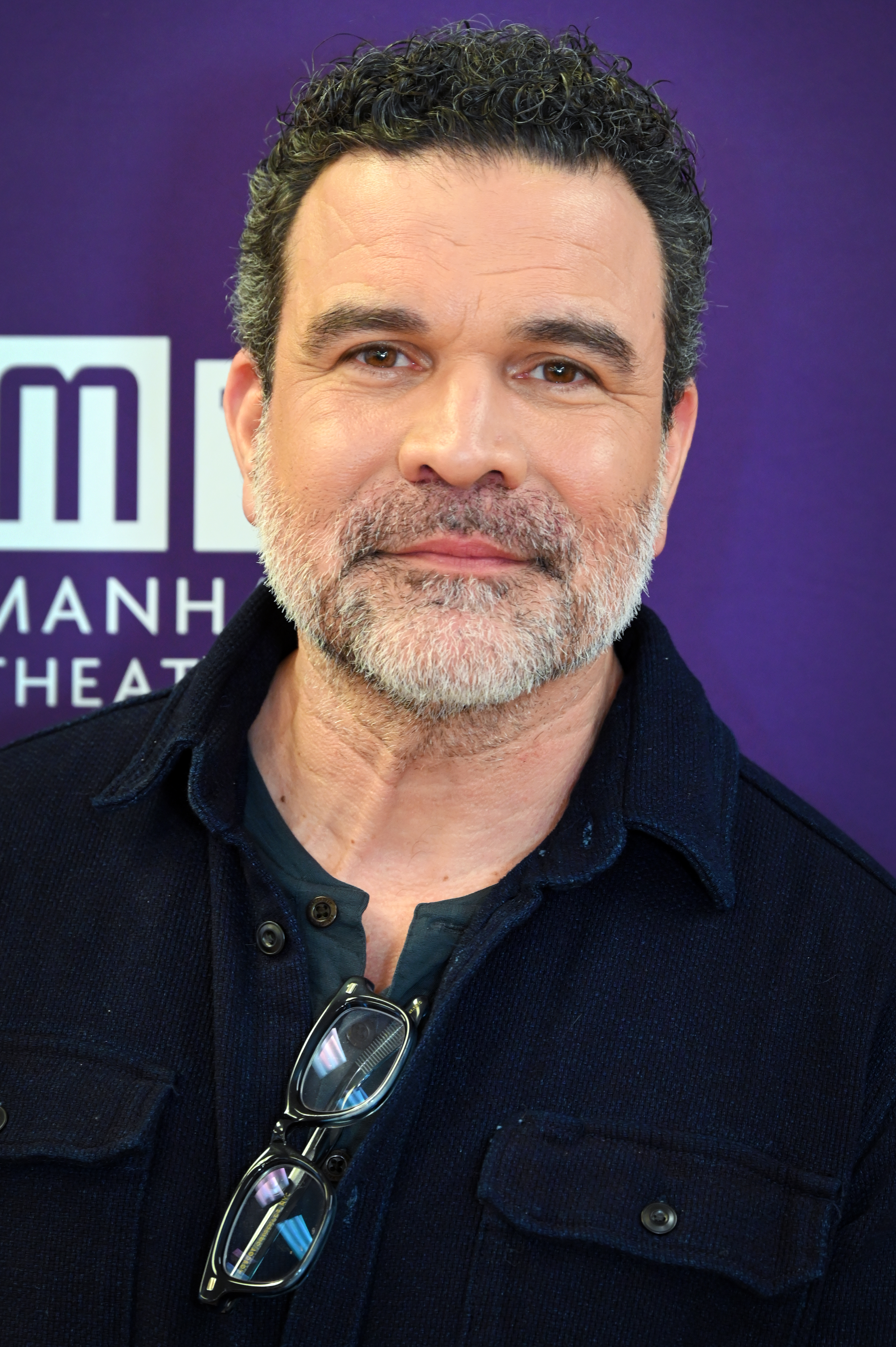
- Chavira in 2026
- Born: Ricardo Antonio Chavira; September 1, 1971 (age 55); San Antonio, Texas, U.S.
- Education: University of the Incarnate Word (BA); University of California, San Diego (MFA)
- Occupation: Actor
- Years active: 1998–present
- Spouse: Marcea Dietzel (m. 2007)
- Children: 2

Ricardo Antonio Chavira (born September 1, 1971) is an American actor. He is best known as Carlos Solis in Desperate Housewives (2004–12) and Abraham Quintanilla in Selena: The Series (2020).

== Early life ==
Chavira is the son of Juan Antonio Chavira, a Bexar County judge, and his wife Elizabeth. Through his father he is of Mexican descent, while he is of German and Irish descent through his mother. Raised in San Antonio, he graduated from Robert E. Lee High School and the University of the Incarnate Word. He received his Master of Fine Arts in Acting from the University of California San Diego's graduate acting program in 2000, and moved to Los Angeles shortly thereafter. Since then, he has worked in film, television and theatre.

== Career ==
Chavira began his career playing guest-starring roles on television shows, include NYPD Blue, 24, The Division, Joan of Arcadia and JAG. In 2002, he had a recurring role in the HBO comedy-drama Six Feet Under and was series regular on the unaired Fox sitcom The Grubbs. In 2004, he made his big screen debut appearing in a supporting role playing private José Gregorio Esparza in the western film The Alamo (2004).

In 2004, Chavira was cast as Carlos Solis, the husband of Eva Longoria's character, Gabrielle Solis, in the ABC comedy-drama series Desperate Housewives. The series was a breakthrough hit for ABC. In 2005, Chavira listed on the "50 Most Beautiful" list in People en Español, and the following year named one of "TV's Sexiest Men" by TV Guide. With the cast, he received two Screen Actors Guild Award for Outstanding Performance by an Ensemble in a Comedy Series in 2005 and 2006, and well as three ALMA Awards nominations for Outstanding Actor in a Comedy Series. The series ended in 2012 after eight seasons.

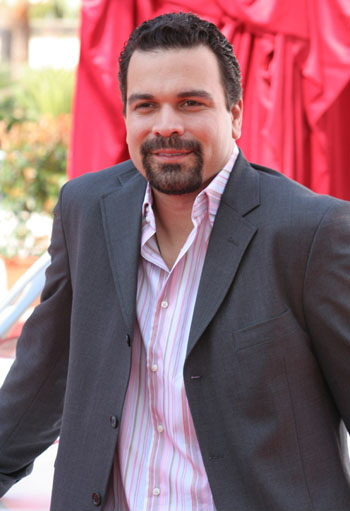
Chavira in 2005

Chavira starred in a production of Tracers at the Odyssey Theatre in Los Angeles, and also starred in a co-production of Living Out. He played Stanley Kowalski in the Guthrie Theater's production of Tennessee Williams' A Streetcar Named Desire, from July 3 to August 21, 2010, in Minneapolis. He also had voice roles as Alejandro Borges in the film Dead Space: Aftermath and as John Carver in the video game Dead Space 3. He also appeared in a number of films, including Days of Wrath (2008), Saving God (2008), and Piranha 3D (2010). Along with the cast, Chavira won Audie Awards for Audiobook of the Year and Multi-Voiced Performance in 2010 for Nelson Mandela's Favorite African Folktales.

Following Desperate Housewives, Chavira guest-starred on two episodes of USA Network drama series, Burn Notice in 2013, playing crime leader Rafael Serrano. Later that year, he went to star in the NBC sitcom Welcome to the Family. The series was canceled after three episodes. In 2015, Chavira guest starred on Castle episode "At Close Range", and in 2016 reunited with Eva Longoria in her short-lived sitcom Telenovela.

From 2016 to 2017, Chavira had a major recurring role in the ABC political thriller Scandal during the fifth and sixth seasons as Democratic Governor Francisco "Frankie" Vargas who runs for president. At the same time, he had a recurring role in The CW comedy series, Jane the Virgin during the third season as Bruce, Xiomara's (Andrea Navedo) lover. In 2017, Chavira also had a recurring role in the Netflix horror-comedy Santa Clarita Diet alongside Timothy Olyphant and Drew Barrymore. In 2020, Chavira was cast as Abraham Quintanilla, the father of late singer Selena in the Netflix limited biographical series, Selena. He was a guest star on Chicago P.D. in 2021.

== Personal life ==
Chavira is a supporter of breast cancer research as his mother, Elizabeth Ries Chavira, died of breast and ovarian cancer when she was 43 years old. Chavira is San Antonio's honorary spokesman for the charity Susan G. Komen for the Cure, and in June 2005 served as the National Team Captain for the Race for the Cure in Washington, D.C. Chavira and James Denton were the 2005 spokespeople for the Lee National Denim Day breast cancer fundraiser.

He has been married to Marcea Dietzel since September 22, 2007. They have two children, a son, Tomás Antonio (b. January 8, 2003) and a daughter, Belén Elysabeth (b. July 28, 2008).

In May 2011, Chavira was arrested for driving under the influence.

In October 2019, Chavira talked on Twitter about the relatively light prison sentence that his former Desperate Housewives castmate Felicity Huffman received for her role in the 2019 college admissions bribery scandal, citing "White Privilege."

== Filmography ==
=== Films ===
Year	Title	Role	Notes
1987	De Vaqueros, aventuras y mas cosas		Short film
1987	Así sucede en los pueblos		Short film
2001	Barstow 2008	Guaco	
2002	Boris	Frank	Short film
2004	The Alamo	Private Gregorio Esparza	
2007	Rockaway	Dave	
2007	Cosmic Radio	Vasquez	
2008	Ball Don't Lie	Ruben	
2008	Days of Wrath	Detective Romeros	
2008	Saving God	Rev. Danny Christopher	
2009	Don't Let Me Drown	Dionisio	
2009	Superman/Batman: Public Enemies	Major Force (voice)	
2010	Chasing 3000	Dr. Boogie	
2010	Piranha 3D	Sam	
2011	Dead Space: Aftermath	Alejandro Borges	
2015	Being Charlie	Drake	
2015	Powder and Gold	Don Toribio	
2016	Birth of a Killer	Lalo	Short film
2018	Tournament	Steve	
2019	Narco Soldiers	Don Toribio	
2021	Reefa	Officer Morales	

=== Television ===
Year	Title	Role	Notes
2001	NYPD Blue	Kenny Sotomayor	Episode: "Thumb Enchanted Evening"
2001	Philly	A.D.A. Eddie Price	Episode: "Blown Away"
2001–03	JAG	Capt. Rapaport / Miguel	2 episodes
2002	24	Agent Bundy	Episode: "12:00 p.m.-1:00 p.m."
2002	Six Feet Under	Ramon	4 episodes
2002	The Division	Bernard	2 episodes
2002	The Grubbs	Coach Garra	Pilot
2003	Kingpin		Episode: "Gimme Shelter"
2003	Joan of Arcadia	Sgt. Eddie Fosberg	Episode: "The Boat"
2004–12	Desperate Housewives	Carlos Solis	Lead role (180 episodes)
2005	George Lopez	Victor	Episode: "George's Extreme Makeover: Holmes Edition"
2007	Kings of South Beach	Enrique	Television film
2007–08	Monk	Jimmy Belmont	2 episodes
2013	Warehouse 13	Detective Briggs	Episode: "Instinct"
2013	Burn Notice	Rafael Serano	2 episodes
2013	Welcome to the Family	Miguel Hernandez / Chuey Hernandez	Lead, 12 episodes
2014	Bad Teacher	Tico	2 episodes
2015	Castle	Congressman Alex Lopez	Episode: "At Close Range"
2016	Telenovela	Martin	Episode: "Split Personalities"
2016–17	Jane the Virgin	Bruce	8 episodes
2016–17	Scandal	Francisco "Frankie" Vargas	15 episodes
2017	Santa Clarita Diet	Dan Palmer	7 episodes
2017	Hawaii Five-0	Agent Callaghan	Episode: "He Kaha Lu'u Ke Ala, Mai Ho'okolo Aku"
2017	Mission Control	Diaz	Television film
2018	Kevin Can Wait	Frank	2 episodes
2018	Rise	Johnny Cruz	Episode: "Opening Night"
2019	Christmas Reservations	Kevin Portillo	Television film
2020–21	Selena: The Series	Abraham Quintanilla	Lead role (18 episodes)
2021	Chicago P.D.	Detective Salvador Ortiz	Episode: "End of Watch"
2023	Truth Be Told	Vince	5 episodes
2023	Blindspotting	Darrell	Episode: "Meatfest"
2023	Glamorous	Teddy	7 episodes
2024	Will Trent	Councilman Victor Carrey	S2E3 "You don’t have to understand"
2024–25	Primos	Tio Ignacio (voice)	Recurring role

== Theatre ==
Year	Title	Role	Venue	Ref(s)
1998	Dogeaters	Freddie Gonzaga / Lt. Pepe Carreon	La Jolla Playhouse	
2004	Living Out	Bobby Hernandez	Seattle Repertory Theatre	
2009	The Three Sisters	Alexander Ignatevich Vershinin	Chalk Repertory Theatre	
2010	A Streetcar Named Desire	Stanley Kowalski	Guthrie Theater	
2015	The Motherfucker with the Hat	Jackie	Royal National Theatre	
2017	Jesus Hopped the 'A' Train	Valdez	Signature Theatre Company	
2018	An Enemy of the People	Peter Stockmann	Guthrie Theater	
2018	The Untranslatable Secrets of Nikki Corona	Orlando	Geffen Playhouse	
2023	Shane	Joe Starrett	Guthrie Theater	
2025	A Doll's House	Nils Krogstad	Guthrie Theater	
