= Marc Cherry =

American television writer and producer

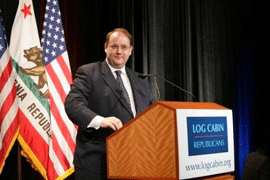
- Cherry addressing the Log Cabin Republicans in 2006
- Born: March 23, 1962 (age 64); Long Beach, California, U.S.
- Education: California State University, Fullerton (BA)
- Occupations: Writer, producer
- Years active: 1990–present
- Notable work: Desperate Housewives; Devious Maids

Marc Cherry (born March 23, 1962) is an American television writer and producer. He is best known for creating the ABC dramedy series Desperate Housewives and Lifetime series Devious Maids, having previously been a writer-producer for The Golden Girls.

== Personal life ==
=== Early life ===
Marc Cherry was born in Long Beach, California, and lived briefly in Oklahoma during his childhood. His father was an accountant whose work brought him back to California. After graduating from Troy High School in Fullerton, Cherry attended California State University, Fullerton. He graduated from the school's theater program in 1985 and initially considered a career in performance. After winning $15,000 as a contestant on The $100,000 Pyramid in 1986, he decided to move to Hollywood and pursue writing work. His move came at a bad time; the 1988 writers strike hit as soon as Cherry arrived. Cherry broke into the industry by working as Designing Women star Dixie Carter's personal assistant.

=== Political views ===
In 2007, Newsweek described Cherry as a "somewhat conservative, gay Republican." He was the 2006 recipient of the Log Cabin Republicans' American Visibility Award. However, in 2018, Cherry said that he "stopped being a Republican the second [Donald Trump's] foot hit the escalator."

=== Family ===
On September 12, 2020, his mother, Martha Kay Cherry, who inspired the characters of Bree Van de Kamp and Lynette Scavo in Desperate Housewives, died.

== Career ==
=== Early career ===
In 1990, he became a writer and producer for the long-running hit sitcom The Golden Girls, and later its short-lived spinoff The Golden Palace. Cherry next co-created The 5 Mrs. Buchanans, a sitcom centered on four women married to brothers and their difficult mother-in-law, which had a brief run on CBS during the 1994–1995 season. Cherry also co-created The Crew (1995). On his own, he later created Some of My Best Friends, a 2001 sitcom that was based in part on the 1997 film Kiss Me, Guido.

=== Desperate Housewives ===
In 2002, a conversation with his mother inspired him to develop a show about the fractured lives of four upper middle class suburban women. After HBO, FOX, CBS, NBC, Showtime, and Lifetime all passed on the show, circumstances changed for Cherry's show when his agent was arrested and sent to jail for embezzlement. His new agents brought the show to the attention of ABC, which decided to pick it up. The series, Desperate Housewives, was an immediate ratings smash and generated enormous national (and subsequently, international) debate. Cherry received several lucrative offers from various parties, but chose to sign a long-term deal with Touchstone, since their co-brand, the ABC network, had shown faith in Desperate Housewives when other companies passed.

Cherry featured several actors on Housewives with whom he had previously worked. Mark Moses, who played Paul Young, and Harriet Sansom Harris, who played Felicia Tilman, were both cast members of The 5 Mrs. Buchanans. In season three, Cherry cast former boss Dixie Carter in the role of Gloria Hodge, Orson's unhinged mother. Actor Alec Mapa, who appeared in Some of My Best Friends, appeared on "Housewives" in a recurring role as Gabrielle's stylist.

Cherry appeared in a cameo as one of Susan's moving men on the final episode of Desperate Housewives.

==== Nicolette Sheridan accusations and termination ====
On April 5, 2010, former Desperate Housewives main cast member Nicollette Sheridan filed a $20 million lawsuit against Cherry and ABC, alleging that he had assaulted her on set and wrongfully terminated her contract. Sheridan also alleged in her lawsuit that Cherry was abusive to other actors and writers on the show. ABC said in a statement that they had investigated similar claims made by Sheridan and found them to be of no merit.

The other principal cast members of Desperate Housewives, including Teri Hatcher, Felicity Huffman, Marcia Cross and Eva Longoria, made statements supporting Cherry. In December 2010, Sheridan removed abuse claims from the suit.

The case finally went to trial in February 2012. On March 13, 2012, the judge dismissed the battery charge against Cherry due to lack of evidence, and Cherry was no longer a defendant in the lawsuit which then focused solely on Sheridan's alleged wrongful termination by ABC. Closing arguments were heard in the case on March 14, 2012, and the jury began their deliberations. By March 19, 2012, the twelve members of the jury had failed to reach a verdict and a mistrial was declared. A retrial was scheduled to begin on September 10, 2012, but on August 16, 2012, the Los Angeles Court of Appeal determined that Sheridan had not been wrongfully fired and dismissed the retrial. A further appeal made by Sheridan to the California Supreme Court was rejected on November 16, 2012.

=== Devious Maids ===
In 2012, after the end of Desperate Housewives, Cherry and Eva Longoria began working on a new series, Devious Maids. Initially it had been produced for ABC, but it then aired on Lifetime.

The series is set in Beverly Hills and the protagonists are Latina maids: Marisol (Ana Ortiz), Rosie (Dania Ramirez), Carmen (Roselyn Sanchez), Zoila (Judy Reyes), and Valentina (Edy Ganem), who work for celebrities or rich people. They not only clean the homes of celebrities, but also put order in their lives, and sometimes fall in love. Just like the women of Wisteria Lane, these maids have to deal with mysteries and secrets, since, during the first episode, one of their friends, the maid Flora, is mysteriously murdered, and it's up to Marisol to investigate the murder and to exonerate her son Eddie, wrongly accused.

Even for Devious Maids, Marc Cherry hired someone who had worked with him: Roselyn Sanchez, who plays Carmen Luna, one of the maids, appeared in the last episode of Desperate Housewives. Others in Devious Maids who had previously worked with Cherry include Rebecca Wisocky, Melinda Page Hamilton, Valerie Mahaffey, Matt Cedeno, Richard Burgi, and James Denton.

=== Why Women Kill ===
On September 24, 2018, it was announced that CBS All Access had given the production a straight-to-series order. Why Women Kill was created by Cherry, who was also expected to executive produce alongside Brian Grazer, Francie Calfo, Michael Hanel, and Mindy Schultheis. Production companies involved with the series were slated to consist of Imagine Entertainment and CBS Television Studios. On December 10, 2018, it was reported that the series would receive $8.4 million in tax credits from the state of California and premiered on August 15, 2019.

=== Other ventures ===
Cherry appeared as himself in the "Righteous Brothers" episode of Arrested Development, which was created by fellow Golden Girls writer Mitchell Hurwitz. In 2014 and 2016, Cherry was a judge and mentor for the Songbook Academy, a summer intensive for high school students operated by the Great American Songbook Foundation and founded by Michael Feinstein. Cherry serves on the board of directors of The Young Americans youth performing arts group and is a 1979 alumnus of the organization.
