= Finishing the Hat (Desperate Housewives) =

- Desperate Housewives episode
- Episode no.: Season 8 Episode 23
- Directed by: David Grossman
- Written by: Marc Cherry
- Production code: 823
- Original air date: May 13, 2012
- Running time: 43 minutes

Guest appearances
- Andrea Bowen as Julie Mayer; Orson Bean as Roy Bender; Christine Estabrook as Martha Huber; Wes Brown as Dr. Bailey; Lindsey Kraft as Jennifer; Patrika Darbo as Jean; Nike Doukas as Natalie Klein; Todd Weeks as Kent; Scott Bakula as Trip Weston; Dana Delany as Katherine Mayfair; Roselyn Sánchez as Carmen (uncredited); Cameo appearance: Marc Cherry as Mover No. 1; Bob Daily as Mover No. 2; Maria Cominis as Mona Clarke; Roger Bart as George Williams; Lupe Ontiveros as Juanita "Mama" Solis; Richard Burgi as Karl Mayer; Justine Bateman as Ellie Leonard; Kiersten Warren as Nora Huntington; Steven Culp as Rex Van de Kamp; Ellen Geer as Lillian Simms; Emily Bergl as Beth Young; Jonathan Cake as Chuck Vance; Valerie Mahaffey as Alma Hodge; David Starzyk as Bradley Scott

Episode chronology
← Previous "Give Me the Blame"	Next → —
- Desperate Housewives season 8

"Finishing the Hat" is the second part of the two-hour series finale of the ABC television series Desperate Housewives. It is the 23rd and final episode of the show's eighth season and the 180th episode overall, which was broadcast on May 13, 2012. While the season was promoted as "Kiss Them Goodbye", the series finale was promoted as "The Final Kiss Goodbye".

== Plot ==
Shortly after Susan tells her friends that she is moving from Wisteria Lane, Katherine Mayfair arrives from Paris for a surprise visit, having founded a successful frozen food conglomerate in France, and offers Lynette a job as the head of her U.S. expansion in New York City. Tom is upset that Lynette is considering taking the job in the midst of their recent reconciliation.

When Gabrielle receives a major promotion at Cumberly's and begins to work long hours, Carlos feels neglected and hires an attractive female gardener, Carmen, as a reference to Gabrielle's former lover John Rowland, which infuriates Gabrielle.

As Bree continues to avoid Trip for betraying her at her trial, she learns from Roy that Trip has located a hard-to-find 45 rpm record of Johnny Mathis's "Wonderful! Wonderful!" that Karen wants for her funeral.

In the limousine on the way to Renee and Ben's wedding, Julie's water breaks, ruining Renee's dress. While Gabrielle takes Renee to Cumberly's for a new dress, Susan jumps into the driver's seat of the limousine and takes Julie to the hospital, forcing Gabrielle and Renee to walk to the wedding. At the wedding, Lynette and Tom decide to move to New York; Bree and Trip reconcile; and Gabrielle and Carlos realize how much they have grown over the years. Julie gives birth to her daughter, while Karen dies with Roy by her side.

During a poker game, before Susan's departure, the four women vow that this will not be their last poker game, but as Mary Alice reveals via voice-over, it turns out to be. Lynette moves to New York with Tom and becomes a CEO; they move into a penthouse apartment overlooking Central Park and end up having six grandchildren. Gabrielle and Carlos start a personal shopping website that leads to her own show on the Home Shopping Network, and they move into a mansion in California. Bree marries Trip and they move to Louisville, where Bree becomes a member of the Kentucky State Legislature.

Before leaving Wisteria Lane, Susan meets Jennifer, who is moving into Susan's old house with her husband. As Susan drives her family around the lane one last time, they are watched by the ghosts of many deceased residents of the lane. (Note: The ghosts of the deceased characters appear in roughly reverse chronological order of death: Mike Delfino, Karen McCluskey and her son, Mona Clarke, George Williams, Juanita "Mama" Solis, Karl Mayer, Ellie Leonard, Nora Huntington, Rex Van de Kamp, Lillian Simms, Beth Young, Chuck Vance, Alma Hodge, Martha Huber, Bradley Scott, and Mary Alice Young.) Later, Jennifer enters the garage and hides a mysterious jewelry box in a locked cabinet.

== Reception ==
=== Ratings ===
The finale was watched by 11.12 million American viewers, earning a 3.2/8 rating/share with adults 18–49. It was the most watched program of the night, tied season high ratings with the season 8 premiere "Secrets That I Never Want to Know", and was the most watched episode of the show since the season 7 episode "Searching", watched by 11.35 million viewers. The finale was also up from the previous season's finale "Come on Over for Dinner", which was watched by 10.25 million viewers and received a 3.1 rating in the 18–49 category. The finale was also up from the previous episode "The People Will Hear", which was watched by 9.22 million viewers and received a 2.7/7 rating. The finale was competing against Survivor: One World Reunion on CBS, which was watched by 7.72 million viewers and held a 2.3/6 rating, and Celebrity Apprentice on NBC, which averaged 5.48 million viewers and held a 1.8/5 rating in the 18–49 demographic. ABC reported that the episode gained an additional 2.1 million viewers (rising to a total of 13.2 million viewers) and 0.9 rating in the 18–49 demographic (rising to a total of a 4.1 rating), in the week following the original broadcast due to DVR recordings.

In Canada, the finale was watched by 1.60 million viewers, placing seventeenth for the week.

=== Critical reception ===
The episode received critical acclaim from critics. Reviewers for The Washington Post called the episode "a tidy, affectionate send-off." Sabrina Ford of The Province called it a "happy ending. If it were [filmed in Wisteria Lane], we could count on a happy ending." Christina Tran of TV Fanatic gave the episode a generally positive review, saying "While this final season has had its fair share of ups and downs, I thought that Marc Cherry and company gave us a very satisfying ending. I wasn’t left needing more, but instead, only realizing how much I would truly miss Desperate Housewives." Alberto E. Rodriguez of the Toronto Star called the finale "a fitting way to end the series that was always seen through the eyes of a dead neighbor."

=== Accolades ===
This episode was submitted for consideration for Kathryn Joosten due to her nomination for the Primetime Emmy Award for Outstanding Supporting Actress in a Comedy Series at the 64th Primetime Emmy Awards.

For her performance in this episode (and the previous episode, "Give Me the Blame"), Brenda Strong was nominated for her second consecutive Primetime Emmy Award for Outstanding Voice-Over Performance as Mary Alice Young.
