= Desperate Housewives season 8 =

Desperate Housewives
- Season 8
- ABC promotional poster for the eighth season of Desperate Housewives. From left to right: Susan, Lynette, Gabrielle, and Bree.
- Starring: Teri Hatcher; Felicity Huffman; Marcia Cross; Eva Longoria; Vanessa Williams; Ricardo Antonio Chavira; Doug Savant; Jonathan Cake; Charles Mesure; Madison De La Garza; Brenda Strong; James Denton
- No. of episodes: 23

Release
- Original network: ABC
- Original release: September 25, 2011 – May 13, 2012

Season chronology
- ← Previous; Season 7

The eighth and final season of Desperate Housewives, a television series created by Marc Cherry, began broadcasting in the United States on September 25, 2011, and concluded on May 13, 2012. The season was promoted as Kiss Them Goodbye.

Desperate Housewives was renewed for an eighth season by ABC on May 17, 2011. The deceased character Mary Alice Young continues to narrate the events in the lives of her Wisteria Lane residents Susan Delfino, Lynette Scavo, Bree Van de Kamp, Gabrielle Solis, and Renee Perry. This season's mystery sees the housewives deal with covering up the murder of Gabrielle's stepfather, Alejandro Perez, from the previous season's finale.

The final season began airing in the Middle East on October 3, 2011, on OSN First and in Latin America on October 6, 2011. It began airing in the United Kingdom on Sunday, January 8, 2012, on E4 and Tuesday, January 10, 2012, on Channel 4; in Ireland on RTÉ Two on Tuesday, January 3, 2012; in Greece on FOXlife on Monday, January 16, 2012; in Austria on January 2, 2012, on ORF; in Germany on January 4, 2012; in Australia on February 2, 2012, and in France on April 12, 2012.

== Production ==
It is an iconic show. We are so proud of it. I just wanted to make sure that this show that put this network on the map ... had its victory lap, had a chance to really set out every episode and build an arc [in its final season.]

— ABC President Paul Lee

In 2007, series creator and executive producer Marc Cherry stated that he planned to end Desperate Housewives after its seventh season in 2011. He explained: "I think that, at the end of my deal, and after seven seasons, it will be a good time to call it quits. I don't want anybody else to run the show and I don't want [it] to fade away ... I don't want to overstay my welcome." Cherry reaffirmed his intentions the following year. However, in 2009, Cherry signed a deal with ABC designed to potentially keep Desperate Housewives on air until the end of its ninth season in 2013. Lead actresses Marcia Cross, Teri Hatcher, Felicity Huffman, and Eva Longoria signed on for an eighth season in April 2011, with each earning a reported salary of $325,000 per episode. Their contracts also included financial incentives for a potential ninth season. ABC officially announced the show's eighth season on May 17, 2011, along with the rest of its primetime schedule for the 2011-2012 television season.

In July 2011, it was reported that ABC was considering ending the series after the eighth season. On August 7, ABC president Paul Lee confirmed that the eighth season would be the show's last at the Television Critics Association media press tour. Cherry commented on the show's ending, stating: "Shows go on too long and they are unceremoniously booted off. I didn’t want it to happen to Desperate Housewives. While we are still a force to be reckoned with, I wanted to go off in the classiest way possible." Cherry reported that the cast was bittersweet over the news of the series' end. "The women knew it was a possibility," he explained. "There was a touch of shock but not completely." Shooting of the series finale took place from April 16 to 26, 2012.

== Cast ==
The eighth and final season had twelve roles receiving star billing, with nine out of thirteen returning from the previous season. The series is narrated by Brenda Strong, who portrays the deceased Mary Alice Young, as she observes from beyond the grave the lives of the Wisteria Lane residents and her former best friends. Teri Hatcher portrayed Susan Delfino, who deals with her involvement in the cover-up of the murder of Gabrielle's stepfather, as well as the death of her husband and the pregnancy of her daughter. Felicity Huffman portrayed Lynette Scavo, now separated from her husband. Marcia Cross portrayed Bree Van de Kamp, who takes charge in the cover-up. Eva Longoria portrayed Gabrielle Solis, whose life suffers radical changes following the cover-up. Vanessa Williams portrayed Renee Perry, who falls in love with the newest resident of Wisteria Lane. Ricardo Antonio Chavira portrayed Carlos Solis, Gabrielle's husband who killed her stepfather in the previous season finale. Doug Savant portrayed Tom Scavo, now separated from Lynette and trying to move on with his life. James Denton portrayed Mike Delfino, Susan's husband who is killed in the second half of the season. After making some guest appearances towards the end of the previous season, Jonathan Cake was made series regular in the role of Chuck Vance, a detective and Bree's love interest. Charles Mesure also joined the main cast as Ben Faulkner, a ruthless, self-made Australian contractor who becomes romantically involved with Renee. Furthermore, Madison De La Garza was promoted from "also starring" to a formal "starring" cast member as Juanita Solis, Gabrielle's oldest daughter. Mark Moses left the main cast again since his character's mystery was resolved in the previous season finale; however, he made one last guest appearance at the beginning of this season as Paul Young, Mary Alice's imprisoned widower.

Kathryn Joosten (Karen McCluskey), Kevin Rahm (Lee McDermott) and Tuc Watkins (Bob Hunter), all of whom were "starring" castmembers in the previous season, were demoted to "also starring" in this season. Also starring were Charlie Carver, Joshua Logan Moore and Darcy Rose Byrnes respectively as Porter, Parker and Penny Scavo, Lynette's children, as well as child actor Mason Vale Cotton portraying M.J. Delfino, Susan's son.

Many established guest stars and former regulars reprised their roles in this season, and new ones were introduced. Part of Gabrielle's storyline were Tony Plana portraying Alejandro Perez, Gabrielle's stepfather whose death at Carlos's hands in the previous season finale is this season's main storyline, Daniella Baltodano playing Celia Solis, Gabrielle's youngest daughter, Justina Machado in the role of Claudia Sanchez, Alejandro's new wife, Daniela Bobadilla appearing as Marisa Sanchez, Claudia's daughter that (like Gabrielle) was abused by Alejandro, John Rubinstein portraying Principal Hobson, headmaster at Juanita's school, Matt Winston acting as Lazaro, who offers Gabrielle a job as personal shopper, and Lupe Ontiveros returning as Juanita "Mama" Solis, Carlos's deceased mother who appears in a flashback. Part of Susan's storyline were Miguel Ferrer playing Andre Zeller, a part-time illustrator who clashes with Susan, Leslie Jordan featuring as Felix Bergman, an art critic interested in Susan's work, and Andrea Bowen returning as Julie Mayer, Susan's daughter who is pregnant with Porter's child. Part of Lynette's storyline were Andrea Parker portraying Jane Carlson, a love interest for Tom, Max Carver appearing as Preston Scavo, another of Lynette's sons, Patrick Fabian playing Frank, a hairdresser that dates Lynette a couple of times, Reed Diamond portraying Gregg Limon, Tom's boss, and former series regular Dana Delany reprising her role as Katherine Mayfair in the series finale, making Lynette a business proposition. Part of Bree's storyline were Shawn Pyfrom and Joy Lauren playing Bree's son and daughter, Andrew and Danielle Van de Kamp, Dakin Matthews appearing as Reverend Sykes, reverend at the local Presbyterian church, Kyle MacLachlan returning as Orson Hodge, Bree's ex-husband who returns to help her with an ulterior motive, Steven Culp reprising his role as Rex Van de Kamp, Bree's deceased first husband who appears in a flashback, Christina Chang portraying Emily Stone, the District Attorney playing the part of the prosecutor in Bree's trial, Alyson Reed playing Judge Conti, who presides over Bree's trial, and Scott Bakula making special guest appearances as Trip Weston, Bree's lawyer and eventually her third husband. Orson Bean portrayed Roy Bender, Mrs. McCluskey's husband, while Christine Estabrook reappeared in the series finale in a flashback as Martha Huber, the woman that blackmailed Mary Alice.

In the final moments of the series finale, a sequence featuring Susan and her family leaving Wisteria Lane saw many other stars making uncredited cameo appearances as ghosts of characters who died during the course of the series. In addition to Strong's, Denton's, Joosten's, Culp's, Estabrook's, Cake's and Ontiveros's characters (all of whom made previous appearances in the season), among the returning ghosts were Roger Bart as George Williams, Justine Bateman as Ellie Leonard, Emily Bergl as Beth Young, Richard Burgi as Karl Mayer, Maria Cominis as Mona Clarke, Ellen Geer as Lillian Simms, Valerie Mahaffey as Alma Hodge, David Starzyk as Bradley Scott, and Kiersten Warren as Nora Huntington.

== Episodes ==
No. overall	No. in season	Title	Directed by	Written by	Original release date	U.S. viewers (millions)
158	1	"Secrets That I Never Want to Know"	David Grossman	Bob Daily	September 25, 2011	9.93
The four housewives and Carlos bury Alejandro Perez's body in the woods and make a pact to keep his death a secret. Carlos's guilt has left him irritable and depressed, so Gabrielle convinces him to confide in his priest. Susan wants to tell Mike about the cover-up, but the other housewives warn her that he could be implicated if they are ever caught. Renee attempts to seduce new neighbor Ben Faulkner, but he rejects her. Lynette and Tom go to great lengths to hide their separation from their children. After Lynette has a nightmare about Alejandro and sleeps with Tom, he assumes they are getting back together, but Lynette tells him they are not. Tom, upset at being led on, discloses the separation to the children. Bree struggles with dating a detective while covering up Alejandro's death. Later, Bree receives an anonymous letter that reads, "I know what you did. It makes me sick. I'm going to tell", the same one that Mary Alice received before killing herself.
159	2	"Making the Connection"	Tara Nicole Weyr	Matt Berry	October 2, 2011	9.16
Carlos, still wracked with guilt, fails to perform sexually, prompting Gabrielle to hire a stripper to spice up their sex life. After Gabrielle's plan backfires, Carlos angrily tells her that their lives are never going back to normal. To ease her guilt, Susan attempts to be punished by committing petty crimes, eventually getting arrested. Susan calls Carlos to bail her out and they confide in each other about how they are both unable to act as if everything is normal. Renee attempts to win over Ben by convincing him that she shares his fondness for the elderly. When Ben takes Renee on a "date" to a senior center, she leaves in frustration before they bond over their own impoverished childhoods. Following their separation, Lynette is annoyed at Tom for making her the "bad guy" by constantly spoiling their children. Bree shows the anonymous letter to Gabrielle, and the two agree not to tell the other women or Carlos. After Bree shows the letter to Paul Young in prison, he tells her that he mentioned Mary Alice's letter to Chuck.
160	3	"Watch While I Revise the World"	David Warren	John Paul Bullock III	October 9, 2011	8.63
Renee reluctantly agrees to take Lee's 11-year-old adopted daughter, Jenny, bra shopping. When Jenny develops a close relationship with Renee, seeing her as a mother figure, Lee worries that Jenny needs a mother, but Renee assures him that he and Bob are great parents. Lynette grows suspicious when her unlucky-in-love sister Lydia comes to town and announces she is engaged to Rashi, a hippie-type yoga instructor, after three weeks. Rashi is appalled by Lydia's behavior during an argument with Lynette and leaves, but Lynette persuades Rashi to give Lydia another chance, and Lydia assures Lynette that she can change too. Convinced that Chuck wrote the letter, Bree is surprised to learn that he plans to propose to her. When Bree breaks up with Chuck, he does not take it well, telling her she has made a big mistake. As Susan and Carlos continue to bond over their feelings of guilt, Mike suspects that they are having an affair, prompting Susan and Carlos to tell Mike the truth about Alejandro's death.
161	4	"School of Hard Knocks"	David Grossman	Marco Pennette	October 16, 2011	8.27
After being dumped by her husband, Danielle visits Bree and starts her own online business. Bree is shocked to discover that Danielle is selling sex swings, but after apologizing for often being so critical of her daughter, she offers to invest in her business as a silent partner. Susan attempts to join a painting class taught by renowned artist Andre Zeller, who quickly dismisses her as a shallow housewife. After Susan expresses her wrath on a canvas, proclaiming that she harbors dark secrets, Andre lets her join his class. Gabrielle clashes with Dana, the antagonistic PTA president at Juanita's school, after breaking student drop-off rules, only to accidentally hit Dana with her car. As revenge, Dana threatens to press charges unless Gabrielle steps in as her temporary replacement. Lynette attends an aerobics class with Renee to spy on the young instructor she believes Tom is seeing, but is heartbroken to learn he is actually dating the woman's mother, Jane Carlson.
162	5	"The Art of Making Art"	Lonny Price	Dave Flebotte	October 23, 2011	9.17
When Andre asks his students to show up to class naked as an experiment, Susan complies but is the only one naked, as she never received Andre's email notifying the students of the change of plans. Susan accuses Andre of trying to humiliate her and quits the class, but he convinces her to return, believing she has the potential to become an artist. The PTA mothers refuse to help new president Gabrielle organize a school event due to her snobbish attitude. Carlos starts drinking to cope with his guilt, and when he embarrasses Gabrielle by showing up drunk at a PTA meeting, the other women are sympathetic and agree to help Gabrielle. When Renee takes a reluctant Lynette to a bar to meet men, Lynette hits it off with a divorced man and goes home with him, but is terrified by the thought of having sex with a new man. Ben has Bree deliver a speech to convince the city council to approve his low-income housing project in Fairview, but to Bree's horror, the construction site is Chapman Woods, where the housewives buried Alejandro.
163	6	"Witch's Lament"	Tony Plana	Annie Weisman	October 30, 2011	9.28
Andre selects Susan as his intern, which involves looking after his estranged son Jasper, while Susan pushes Andre to become more involved in his son's life. When Jane offers to make an elaborate Halloween costume for Penny, Lynette orders a professional costume, which turns out to be a sexualized cat costume. As Jane helps make the costume more appropriate, Lynette privately asks her to back off from Tom, which Jane refuses. Renee takes a Chinese "love fluid" as she prepares to have sex with Ben for the first time, but ends up hospitalized with a rash. Renee tells Ben that she wanted their first night together to be special, and they confess their feelings for each other. Gabrielle convinces Carlos to attend an AA meeting, but he denies he is an alcoholic. Carlos is horrified by a hallucination of Alejandro when a trick-or-treater shows up at his house, driving him to drink. After Bree fails to stop Ben's real estate development, she, Gabrielle, and Lynette travel to Chapman Woods at night to dig up Alejandro's corpse, only to find it gone.
164	7	"Always in Control"	Jeff Greenstein	Jeff Greenstein	November 6, 2011	8.78
Susan suffers a creative block after Andre criticizes her portfolio as boring and predictable. As Penny and Jane become close, Lynette tells Penny lies to turn her against Jane. Tom is upset when Penny starts to avoid him, until Lynette convinces Penny that spending time with her father is important. When Gabrielle and Carlos, afraid of going to jail, consider appointing Bob and Lee as Juanita and Celia's legal guardians, Juanita worries about how unhappy her parents have been lately, but Gabrielle comforts her. Bree learns that Ben is responsible for the disappearance of Alejandro's corpse, and she confesses that she helped bury it. When Chuck, who has been assigned to investigate Alejandro's disappearance, harasses Bree, Ben fends Chuck off and protects Bree by having Mike bury the body under the concrete foundations at the site. Susan is furious to learn that the other housewives tried to move the body without telling her. Susan and Lynette storm out after discovering Bree and Gabrielle have kept the anonymous letter a secret from them.
165	8	"Suspicion Song"	Jennifer Getzinger	David Schaldweiler	November 13, 2011	9.29
Chuck continues to stalk and harass Bree as he investigates Alejandro's disappearance. One of Carlos's biggest clients discovers his drinking problem and, being a recovering alcoholic himself, urges Carlos to seek help. When Lynette receives a bouquet of flowers from Tom for their wedding anniversary, she assumes he is still interested in her. Lynette attempts to win Tom back by surprising him with a bottle of scotch, but is embarrassed to find that he placed a standing order at the florist and forgot to cancel it. Susan creates a series of paintings that depict scenes of the night the housewives buried Alejandro, and despite her objections, Andre and art dealer Felix Bergman put the paintings on display in Felix's gallery without her consent. In despair, Susan urges Bree and Gabrielle to buy her paintings, but after Chuck arrives at the gallery and discloses his investigation, Susan and Gabrielle abandon Bree for not telling them about Alejandro's missing persons report, leading Bree to break her sobriety.
166	9	"Putting It Together"	David Warren	Sheila Lawrence	December 4, 2011	8.20
Chuck interrogates Susan, Lynette, and Gabrielle individually at the police station, but the women deny knowing Alejandro. Ostracized by her friends, Bree gets drunk at a bar and is later consoled by Ben. Renee sees Ben hugging Bree outside her house and assumes they are having an affair. Worried about their children, Lynette confesses to Tom that she is an accessory to Alejandro's murder just as he is about to leave for Paris with Jane. Tom agrees to stay, and an upset Jane boards the plane alone. At Felix's suggestion, Susan considers moving to New York City to evade Chuck and explore new career opportunities, but Mike refuses to join her. After Chuck visits Gabrielle with evidence that Alejandro was her stepfather, she attempts to contact Carlos at the rehabilitation center he is staying at, but is informed that he has checked himself out, so she leaves in search of him. Chuck is run over and killed by a hit-and-run driver. Bree checks into a motel room with a bottle of wine and a gun, where she sees a vision of Mary Alice.
167	10	"What's to Discuss, Old Friend"	David Grossman	Wendy Mericle	January 8, 2012	8.84
Just as Bree prepares to shoot herself, Renee barges into her motel room, accusing Bree of having an affair with Ben. After noticing Bree's gun and suicide note, Renee moves in with her to ensure she is okay. Bree initially resists Renee's efforts to help her, but after Renee tells Bree about her mother's suicide, the two grow closer. After hearing the news of Chuck's death due to a hit-and-run, the four housewives come together and agree to move on. Carlos comes home drunk, and at Chuck's funeral, Gabrielle learns from a policeman that Carlos went to the police station to make a confession about beating someone with a candlestick. Carlos agrees to check back into rehab. Tom is furious with Lynette for becoming involved in Alejandro's murder, though he admits that he still cares about her. Lynette encourages Tom to join Jane in Paris if she makes him happy. Susan tells Mike she is going to Oklahoma City to check up on Alejandro's family. Bree receives a second anonymous letter, which reads, "You're welcome".
168	11	"Who Can Say What's True?"	Larry Shaw	Brian Tanen	January 15, 2012	7.91
Bree shows the second letter to Gabrielle and Lynette, who continue to shun her. To cheer Bree up, Renee takes her to a dive bar, where Bree flirts with a random man and ends up going skinny dipping in the pool of his opulent house, before the real owner, his boss, catches them. Gabrielle decides to attend an important business dinner in Carlos's place, asking Lynette for business tips, but they argue when Lynette remarks how Gabrielle has always coasted on her looks, while Gabrielle accuses Lynette of being a know-it-all. Gabrielle and Lynette eventually apologize to each other and bond over their lives without their husbands. Mike stops Ben from making a deal with a loan shark, Donny, and later reveals to Ben that Renee received a large divorce settlement. In Oklahoma City, Susan meets Alejandro's wife Claudia and 15-year-old stepdaughter Marisa, writing them a check to help their financial woes. After learning that Alejandro had been sexually abusing Marisa, Susan assures her that he is never coming back.
169	12	"What's the Good of Being Good"	Ron Underwood	Jason Ganzel	January 22, 2012	7.48
Bree engages in a series of one-night stands with random men she picks up from the dive bar. At the local church bake sale, Bree encounters one of her lovers, who turns out to be married, and proudly owns up to her reputation as the "town whore". When Claudia angrily accuses Susan of having an affair with Alejandro, Gabrielle tells Claudia that she was molested by Alejandro at age 15; Claudia refuses to believe this until Marisa confesses to it herself, leading Claudia to comfort her daughter. Renee reluctantly sets Lynette up on a date with her hairdresser, Frank. The date is a disaster as Lynette tries to control Frank's life and offers him a five-year business plan, and Frank takes his revenge on Renee by giving her a huge perm. Renee happily accepts Ben's marriage proposal, but he ends up admitting that he wants to marry her for her money, prompting her to end the relationship. Ben borrows money from Donny and warns him to stay away from Renee.
170	13	"Is This What You Call Love?"	David Grossman	David Schladweiler & Valérie A. Brotski	February 12, 2012	6.40
Julie visits Susan and reveals she is six months pregnant, but to Susan's dismay, Julie plans to give her daughter up for adoption. Frank gives Lynette another chance, and they have a pleasant second date, although she is hesitant to have sex. When Lynette finally overcomes her fears, she ends up crying while having sex with Frank, realizing that her marriage is over. Juanita is upset when she does not receive a Valentine's Day card from her school crush, so Gabrielle gives her a fake card from the boy. Juanita tries to kiss her crush during recess and is nearly expelled for sexual harassment, before Gabrielle apologizes for deceiving her daughter. After learning that Bree has been drinking again and sleeping with multiple men, Susan, Lynette, and Gabrielle try to stage an intervention, but Bree lashes out at them for the way she has been treated lately, while revealing her suicide attempt. At the dive bar, a man harasses Bree until a wheelchair-using Orson Hodge comes to her rescue, claiming that her friends had called him.
171	14	"Get Out of My Life"	James Hayman	Cindy Appel	February 19, 2012	7.65
Gabrielle reluctantly lets Roy stay with her after Karen kicks him out, but is pleased to find how good he is at keeping her unruly daughters under control. Porter and Preston move back in with Lynette after being evicted from their apartment, much to her chagrin. When Porter is revealed as the father of Julie's baby, Susan supports his decision to raise the child himself, while Lynette tries to dissuade him, and Julie berates Susan for interfering with her decision. Ben admits to Mike that he is having trouble paying back Donny and is hospitalized due to stress-related chest pains. Although Ben rejects Renee's offer to help him, she pays off Donny behind Ben's back. As Orson moves back in with Bree, he tricks her into believing that the other housewives are still angry at her and proposes that they start a new life in Maine. Flashbacks reveal that Orson has been stalking Bree for months, witnessing the housewives bury Alejandro's body, and that he was the sender of the anonymous letters.
172	15	"She Needs Me"	Randy Zisk	Jason Ganzel	March 4, 2012	8.21
Despite refusing to help raise Porter and Julie's baby, Lynette clashes with Susan when the latter sets up a nursery in her house, but they make amends after Lynette learns of Susan's falling-out with Julie. Gabrielle discovers that Karen has terminal cancer and has been pushing Roy away because his first wife died of cancer. After Gabrielle informs Roy of Karen's cancer, Karen and Roy reconcile, while Gabrielle welcomes Carlos home from rehab. Donny stops by Renee's house and demands more money, but she stands up to him. While Renee is with Ben at the hospital, Mike catches Donny breaking into Renee's house and throws him out. Stopping at Orson's apartment before their trip to Maine, Bree discovers that he was behind the anonymous letters and Chuck's death. Orson admits he was trying to isolate Bree from her friends in an attempt to win her back, prompting Bree to sever ties with Orson. After Orson calls Bree, implying that he intends to commit suicide, he mails an anonymous envelope to the Fairview Police.
173	16	"You Take for Granted"	Jeff Greenstein	Matt Berry	March 11, 2012	8.39
Bree reconciles with Susan, Lynette, and Gabrielle, telling them about Orson's wrongdoings. When Karen asks Bree to help her die with dignity, Bree reluctantly agrees but eventually convinces Karen to reconsider. After finding a gun in Mike's pocket and learning that he protected Renee from Donny, Susan unsuccessfully tries to request police protection. Gabrielle is furious when Carlos suddenly starts giving money away to people in need, before he announces he wants to quit his job to do something meaningful with his life. At Penny's birthday party, Jane informs Lynette that she and Tom are moving in together, upsetting Lynette. When Jane chokes on a cheese puff, Lynette hesitates to help her before performing the Heimlich maneuver on her at the last minute, claiming to have panicked. The police receive Orson's envelope containing evidence of Bree's role in the cover-up of Alejandro's murder. While with Susan on their front porch, Mike is killed by Donny in a drive-by shooting.
174	17	"Women and Death"	David Grossman	Annie Weisman	March 18, 2012	9.03
Before attending Mike's funeral service, Bree is questioned by Detective Heredia about Alejandro and denies killing him. At Mike's funeral, Gabrielle and Lynette reflect on how he impacted their lives; Gabrielle remembers how Mike supported Carlos in rehab and told her that Carlos was afraid she might leave him if he could no longer provide for her, which prompts Gabrielle to agree to let Carlos quit his job to be a counselor, while Lynette reminisces about how Mike helped her realize she and Tom were meant to be together shortly after their separation. Susan concludes the service with an impromptu, moving eulogy to Mike, before Renee sings "Amazing Grace". After the funeral, Susan is comforted by Lynette, Bree, and Gabrielle. The police discover Alejandro's body buried at Ben's construction site. Detectives Murphy and Heredia find that the fingerprints on Bree's mug match the ones found on Alejandro's corpse.
175	18	"Any Moment"	Randy Zisk	Sheila Lawrence	March 25, 2012	8.81
Ben is questioned by the police about the discovery of Alejandro's body at his construction site, but is eventually cleared and becomes engaged to Renee. Bree is surprised that Andrew is engaged to marry Mary Beth, an heiress who is aware of his homosexuality, for her money. After convincing Mary Beth to break up with Andrew, Bree offers to help him with his financial troubles. Seeking to maintain her lavish lifestyle, Gabrielle is hired as a personal shopper at the Cumberly's clothing store after her shopping skills impress the store manager. Lynette hatches a plan to win Tom back by lying that the power in her house is out. As they bond over looking at an old photo album, Lynette accidentally sets Tom's arm on fire with a candle, and he is furious to discover the ruse. Susan helps M.J. cope with Mike's death after he becomes aggressive and insolent, throwing a stapler at his teacher's head. Bree calls Ben to thank him for keeping her secret, unaware that the police are listening to their conversation in a disguised van parked outside.
176	19	"With So Little to Be Sure Of"	Tara Nicole Weyr	Marco Pennette	April 1, 2012	8.49
Bree is arrested for Alejandro's murder at Renee's bridal shower and is referred to Trip Weston, a hotshot defense attorney, by Bob. Trip initially refuses to defend Bree, saying her case is not challenging enough, but eventually accepts the job after deducing that she knows who really murdered Alejandro. Struggling to secure female customers at Cumberly's, Gabrielle transfers to the men's department and becomes a success with male customers by flirting with them. Carlos becomes jealous and reveals he feels emasculated because Gabrielle is now the breadwinner. After Jane delivers Lynette her divorce papers behind Tom's back, an angry and hurt Lynette confronts Tom before signing the divorce papers. Tom lashes out at Jane for her behavior, declaring that he will always care about Lynette. Susan discovers that Mike had an autistic sister named Laura, whom he only learned about eight years earlier. Upon learning that Mike's mother gave Laura away because she was an inconvenience, Julie decides to keep her baby.
177	20	"Lost My Power"	David Grossman	Wendy Mericle	April 29, 2012	8.02
After seeing Tom and Jane kissing at work, Lynette accepts a date from Tom's boss, Gregg. Lynette is happy when Gregg causes friction between Tom and Jane by giving him more work, until Gregg announces plans to send Tom to India for a year. Gabrielle is hired by Doris, a wealthy elderly widow, as her personal shopper, but Doris returns her purchases after Carlos convinces her to donate to his charity helping recovering addicts. Gabrielle retaliates by redesigning Carlos's office with opulent decorations, leading Doris to think he is a swindler and leave. When M.J. rejects Susan's efforts to help him build a car for the school's father–son soapbox derby, she enlists Tom, Ben, Bob, and Lee to help M.J. instead. Renee discovers that Ben is on the witness list for Bree's trial, demanding that he tell her the truth about the dead body found at his construction site after their wedding. Trip convinces Bree to open up about her alcohol-fueled promiscuous phase. Despite warnings from her friends, Bree agrees to go to dinner with Trip.
178	21	"The People Will Hear"	David Warren	Brian Tanen	May 6, 2012	9.22
As her trial nears, Bree develops feelings for Trip. Lynette and Susan are shocked by Gabrielle's nonchalant attitude towards the trial, before it finally dawns on Gabrielle that Bree might take the fall for Carlos. After Tom tells Lynette he will miss her, Lynette convinces Gregg not to send Tom to India before ending things with Gregg, who becomes furious. When Gregg badmouths Lynette at work, Tom punches him and is fired. Jane breaks up with Tom after he admits he still loves Lynette. When Tom goes to Lynette's house, he sees a man (Lee) helping take her dress off and leaves, believing that she has moved on. With Porter working multiple jobs to provide for his unborn daughter, Susan offers to move with Julie and help raise the baby so Julie can finish her PhD degree. At the trial, Bree is painted as a promiscuous alcoholic, but Susan, Lynette, and Gabrielle all testify that Bree did not kill Alejandro. Trip discovers that Alejandro was Gabrielle's stepfather and urges Bree to tell the truth about Gabrielle, but Bree refuses to betray her friends.
179	22	"Give Me the Blame"	Larry Shaw	Bob Daily	May 13, 2012	11.12
180	23	"Finishing the Hat"	David Grossman	Marc Cherry	May 13, 2012	11.12
Susan, Lynette, Bree, and Gabrielle take turns watching over Karen so she can spend her final days at home. At Bree's trial, Ben refuses to answer the DA's questions and is held in contempt. After the DA threatens to have Ben deported, Renee reluctantly testifies that she saw Bree carrying a shovel on the night of Alejandro's murder. After Trip kisses Bree during a recess, she tells him the truth about the night of the murder and makes him promise not to use this information against her friends. Nevertheless, at Trip's request, Gabrielle is called to the stand and forced to reveal to the court that Alejandro was her stepfather. Gabrielle and Carlos argue as they both want to confess to killing Alejandro. Having overheard Gabrielle and Carlos's conversation, Karen asks Trip to put her on the stand and falsely confesses to killing Alejandro. No charges are pressed against Karen due to her age and illness, and Bree is acquitted. Lynette and Tom confess their love for each other and reconcile. Katherine Mayfair arrives in Fairview from Paris, offering Lynette a job as the head of the U.S. division of her frozen food company in New York City. When Gabrielle receives a major promotion at Cumberly's and begins to work long hours, Carlos feels neglected and hires an attractive female gardener as a joke, infuriating Gabrielle. As Bree continues to avoid Trip for betraying her, she learns from Roy that Trip has located a hard-to-find 45 rpm record that Karen wants for her funeral. At Renee and Ben's wedding, Lynette and Tom decide to move to New York; Trip convinces Bree that he truly cares for her, and they kiss; and Gabrielle and Carlos realize how much they have grown over the years. Julie gives birth to her daughter, while Karen dies with Roy by her side. After a final poker game, Susan, Lynette, Bree, and Gabrielle all move away from Wisteria Lane. As Susan drives her family around Wisteria Lane one last time before they leave, they are watched by the ghosts of many deceased residents of the lane, including Mike.

== Ratings ==
=== United States (ABC) ===
==== Live ratings ====
No. in Series	No. in Season	Episode Title	Original Air Date	Timeslot (EST)	18-49 (Rating/Share)	Viewers (m)	Rank Out of Top 25
158	1	Secrets That I Never Want to Know	September 25, 2011	Sundays; 9:00 P.M.	3.2	9.93	N/A
159	2	Making the Connection	October 2, 2011	Sundays; 9:00 P.M.	3.0	9.16	N/A
160	3	Watch While I Revise the World	October 9, 2011	Sundays; 9:00 P.M.	2.8	8.62	N/A
161	4	School of Hard Knocks	October 16, 2011	Sundays; 9:00 P.M.	2.7	8.27	N/A
162	5	The Art of Making Art	October 23, 2011	Sundays; 9:00 P.M.	3.0	9.17	N/A
163	6	Witch's Lament	October 30, 2011	Sundays; 9:00 P.M.	3.1	9.27	N/A
164	7	Always in Control	November 6, 2011	Sundays; 9:00 P.M.	2.8	8.77	N/A
165	8	Suspicion Song	November 13, 2011	Sundays; 9:00 P.M.	3.0	9.28	N/A
166	9	Putting It Together	December 4, 2011	Sundays; 9:00 P.M.	2.7	8.20	N/A
167	10	What's to Discuss, Old Friend	January 8, 2012	Sundays; 9:00 P.M.	3.0	8.84	22
168	11	Who Can Say What's True?	January 15, 2012	Sundays; 9:00 P.M.	2.7	7.91	N/A
169	12	What's the Good of Being Good	January 22, 2012	Sundays; 9:00 P.M.	2.6	7.47	N/A
170	13	Is This What You Call Love?	February 12, 2012	Sundays; 9:00 P.M.	1.8	6.40	N/A
171	14	Get Out of My Life	February 19, 2012	Sundays; 9:00 P.M.	2.2	7.65	N/A
172	15	She Needs Me	March 4, 2012	Sundays; 9:00 P.M.	2.5/6	8.21	N/A
173	16	You Take for Granted	March 11, 2012	Sundays; 9:00 P.M.	2.6/6	8.39	20
174	17	Women and Death	March 18, 2012	Sundays; 9:00 P.M.	2.6/6	9.03	17
175	18	Any Moment	March 25, 2012	Sundays; 9:00 P.M.	2.6/7	8.81	22
176	19	With So Little to Be Sure Of	April 1, 2012	Sundays; 9:00 P.M.	2.6/6	8.49	24
177	20	Lost My Power	April 29, 2012	Sundays; 9:00 P.M.	2.5/6	8.02	23
178	21	The People Will Hear	May 6, 2012	Sundays; 9:00 P.M.	2.7/7	9.22	25
179	22	Give Me the Blame	May 13, 2012	Sundays; 9:00 P.M.	3.2/8	11.12	14
180	23	Finishing the Hat	May 13, 2012	Sundays; 9:00 P.M.	3.2/8	11.12	14

==== Live + 7 Day (DVR) Ratings ====
No. in Series	No. in Season	Episode	Air Date	Timeslot (EST)	18–49 rating increase	Viewers (millions) increase	Total 18–49	Total viewers (millions)	Ref
158	1	"Secrets That I Never Want to Know"	September 25, 2011	Sundays; 9:00 P.M.	TBA	TBA	TBA	TBA	TBA
159	2	"Making the Connection"	October 2, 2011	Sundays; 9:00 P.M.	1.1	2.27	4.1	11.43	
160	3	Watch While I Revise the World	October 9, 2011	Sundays; 9:00 P.M.	.9	2.02	3.7	10.65	
161	4	School of Hard Knocks	October 16, 2011	Sundays; 9:00 P.M.	.9	2.08	3.6	10.35	
162	5	The Art of Making Art	October 23, 2011	Sundays; 9:00 P.M.	.9	2.07	3.9	11.25	
163	6	Witch's Lament	October 30, 2011	Sundays; 9:00 P.M.	.9	1.99	4.0	11.27	
164	7	Always in Control	November 6, 2011	Sundays; 9:00 P.M.	1.0	-	3.8	-	
165	8	Suspicion Song	November 13, 2011	Sundays; 9:00 P.M.	-	-	-	-	
166	9	Putting It Together	December 4, 2011	Sundays; 9:00 P.M.	.9	2.17	3.6	10.37	
167	10	What's to Discuss, Old Friend	January 8, 2012	Sundays; 9:00 P.M.	1.0	2.02	4.0	10.85	
168	11	Who Can Say What's True?	January 15, 2012	Sundays; 9:00 P.M.	.9	2.15	3.6	10.06	
169	12	What's the Good of Being Good	January 22, 2012	Sundays; 9:00 P.M.	1.0	-	3.6	-	
170	13	Is This What You Call Love?	February 12, 2012	Sundays; 9:00 P.M.	1.0	-	2.8	-	
171	14	Get Out of My Life	February 19, 2012	Sundays; 9:00 P.M.	1.0	-	3.2	-	
172	15	She Needs Me	March 4, 2012	Sundays; 9:00 P.M.	.9	-	3.4	-	
173	16	You Take for Granted	March 11, 2012	Sundays; 9:00 P.M.	.8	1.94	3.4	10.33	
174	17	Women and Death	March 18, 2012	Sundays; 9:00 P.M.	.7	1.58	3.3	10.61	
175	18	Any Moment	March 25, 2012	Sundays; 9:00 P.M.	.9	2.00	3.5	10.82	
176	19	With So Little to Be Sure Of	April 1, 2012	Sundays; 9:00 P.M.	.9	1.97	3.5	10.46	
177	20	Lost My Power	April 29, 2012	Sundays; 9:00 P.M.	.9	1.98	3.4	9.99	
178	21	The People Will Hear	May 6, 2012	Sundays; 9:00 P.M.	.9	-	3.6	-	
179	22	Give Me the Blame	May 13, 2012	Sundays; 9:00 P.M.	.9	2.10	4.1	13.22	
180	23	Finishing the Hat	May 13, 2012	Sundays; 9:00 P.M.	.9	2.10	4.1	13.22	

=== International ratings ===
List of International Ratings

==== Canadian ratings (On CTV) ====
Episode number Production number	Title	Original airing	Total viewers (in millions)	Rank per week
158; 8-01	Secrets That I Never Want to Know	September 25, 2011	1.744	#17
159; 8-02	Making the Connection	October 2, 2011	1.583	#16
160; 8-03	Watch While I Revise the World	October 9, 2011	1.186	#30
161; 8-04	School of Hard Knocks	October 16, 2011	1.631	#20
162; 8-05	The Art of Making Art	October 23, 2011	1.650	#18
163; 8-06	Witch's Lament	October 30, 2011	1.631	#16
164; 8-07	Always in Control	November 6, 2011	1.444	#23
165; 8-08	Suspicion Song	November 13, 2011	1.532	#20
166; 8-09	Putting It Together	December 4, 2011	1.533	#16
167; 8-10	What's to Discuss, Old Friend	January 8, 2012	0.946^{[A]}	N/A
168; 8-11	Who Can Say What's True?	January 15, 2012	0.574^{[B]}	N/A
169; 8-12	What's the Good of Being Good	January 22, 2012	0.723^{[C]}	N/A
170; 8-13	Is This What You Call Love?	February 12, 2012	1.058	N/A
171; 8-14	Get Out of My Life	February 19, 2012	1.334	#21
172; 8-15	She Needs Me	March 4, 2012	1.369	#19
173; 8-16	You Take for Granted	March 11, 2012	1.446	#14
174; 8-17	Women and Death	March 18, 2012	1.734	#8
175; 8-18	Any Moment	March 25, 2012	1.484	#15
176; 8-19	With So Little to Be Sure Of	April 1, 2012	N/A^{[D]}	N/A
177; 8-20	Lost My Power	April 29, 2012	1.452	#14
178; 8-21	The People Will Hear	May 6, 2012	N/A^{[E]}	N/A
179; 8-22	Give Me the Blame	May 13, 2012	1.599	#17
180; 8-23	Finishing the Hat	May 13, 2012	1.599	#17

- ^{A} This episode was delayed on its original airing, due to a football overrun on CTV.
- ^{B} This episode was moved to CTV Two, due to the Golden Globe Awards airing on CTV.
- ^{C} This episode was moved to CTV Two, due to the NFC Championship Game airing on CTV.
- ^{D} This episode was preempted to an earlier timeslot due to the airing of the Juno Awards on CTV and the airing of the Academy of Country Music Awards on CTV Two.
- ^{E} This episode was moved to an earlier time, due to the airing The Amazing Race finale.

==== United Kingdom (On Channel 4) ====
- In the UK, the season first airs on E4 on Sunday nights at 10:00 pm, and on Channel 4 on Tuesdays at 11:00 pm. Episodes 1 to 16 aired on Tuesdays on Channel 4 at 11:05 pm, with some episodes beginning at 11:15 pm. From episode 17 to 23 the show moved to Wednesdays at 11:25 pm with the finale airing Thursday June 14 at midnight. With the show airing at a later time on Tuesdays and Wednesdays the Channel 4 ratings may are not available but the ratings for E4 are available.

Episode number	Title	Channel 4		E4 (+1)		Total viewers
Episode number	Title	Airdate	Viewers^{a}	Airdate	Viewers^{a}	Total viewers
158; 8-01	Secrets That I Never Want to Know	January 10, 2012	N/A	January 8, 2012	1,000,000 - #2 (N/A)	1.00m
159; 8-02	Making the Connection	January 17, 2012	N/A	January 15, 2012	925,000 - #1 (320,000 - #3)	1.245m
160; 8-03	Watch While I Revise the World	January 24, 2012	N/A	January 22, 2012	983,000 - #1 (322,000 - #3)	1.305m
161; 8-04	School of Hard Knocks	January 31, 2012	N/A	January 29, 2012	1.163m - #1 (298,000 - #5)	1.452m
162; 8-05	The Art of Making Art	February 7, 2012	N/A	February 5, 2012	1.014m - #1 (274,000 - #10)	1.288m
163; 8-06	Witch's Lament	February 14, 2012	N/A	February 12, 2012	941,000 - #1 (N/A)	0.941m
164; 8-07	Always in Control	February 21, 2012	N/A	February 19, 2012	1.014m = #1 (284,000 - #5)	1.296m
165; 8-08	Suspicion Song	February 28, 2012	N/A	February 26, 2012	1.176m - #1 (276,000 - #6)	1.449m
166; 8-09	Putting It Together	March 6, 2012	N/A	March 4, 2012	1.173m - #1 (230,000 - #10)	1.403m
167; 8-10	What's to Discuss, Old Friend	March 13, 2012	N/A	March 11, 2012	1.240m - #1 (273,000 - #4)	1.513m
168; 8-11	Who Can Say What's True?	March 20, 2012	N/A	March 18, 2012	1.084m - #1 (240,000 - #9)	1.342m
169; 8-12	What's the Good of Being Good	March 27, 2012	N/A	March 25, 2012	1.133m - #1 (260,000 - #10)	1.393m
170; 8-13	Is This What You Call Love?	April 3, 2012	N/A	April 1, 2012	1.071m - #1 (252,000 - #7)	1.323m
171; 8-14	Get Out of My Life	April 10, 2012	N/A	April 8, 2012	1.095m - #5 (267,000 - #8)	1.362m
172; 8-15	She Needs Me	April 17, 2012	N/A	April 15, 2012	1.151m - #2 (N/A)	1.151m
173; 8-16	You Take for Granted	April 24, 2012	N/A	April 22, 2012	1.072m - #4 (266,000 - #10)	1.338m
174; 8-17	Women and Death	May 2, 2012	N/A	April 29, 2012	1.247m - #2 (311,000 - #8)	1.558m
175; 8-18	Any Moment	May 9, 2012	N/A	May 6, 2012	1.171m - #2 (N/A)	1.171m
176; 8-19	With So Little to Be Sure Of	May 16, 2012	N/A	May 13, 2012	1.168m - #2 (323,000 - #3)	1.491m
177; 8-20	Lost My Power	May 23, 2012	N/A	May 20, 2012	1.366m - #2 (N/A)	1.366m
178; 8-21	The People Will Hear	May 30, 2012	N/A	May 27, 2012	1.212m - #2 (270,000 - #9)	1.482m
179; 8-22	Give Me the Blame	June 6, 2012	N/A	June 3, 2012	1.110m - #2 (380,000 - #4)	1.400m
180; 8-23	Finishing the Hat	June 14, 2012	N/A	June 10, 2012	1.605m - #1 (394,000 - #1)	1.999m

==== Ireland On RTÉ 2 ====
- Desperate Housewives airs Tuesdays at 9:55 pm on RTÉ 2.
- All ratings below are supplied from The RTÉ Guide. The ratings are supplied by TAM Ireland/Nielsen TAM.
- As with the US ratings, the Irish ratings for season 8 saw series lows also hitting below the 300,000 mark to a low of 277,000. The series finale managed a season high and was the highest rated episode in over a year. Season 8 averaged 321,182 viewers (22 out of the 23 episodes are counted), which is down a great deal from season 7's average of 437,348.

Episode number	Title	Original airing	Timeslot	Viewers	Rank	Ref
158 (8-01)	Secrets That I Never Want to Know	3 January 2012	9:55 pm	344,000	#1	
159 (8-02)	Making the Connection	10 January 2012	9:55 pm	336,000	#1	
160 (8-03)	Watch While I Revise the World	17 January 2012	9:55 pm	312,000	#1	
161 (8-04)	School of Hard Knocks	24 January 2012	9:55 pm	294,000	#1	
162 (8-05)	The Art of Making Art	31 January 2012	9:55 pm	298,000	#3	
163 (8-06)	Witch's Lament	7 February 2012	9:55 pm	305,000	#2	
164 (8-07)	Always in Control	14 February 2012	9:55 pm	289,000	#2	
165 (8-08)	Suspicion Song	21 February 2012	9:55 pm	292,000	#3	
166 (8-09)	Putting It Together	28 February 2012	9:55 pm	300,000	#2	
167 (8–10)	What's to Discuss, Old Friend	6 March 2012	9:55 pm	323,000	#2	
168 (8–11)	Who Can Say What's True?	13 March 2012	9:55 pm	322,000	#4	
169 (8–12)	What's the Good of Being Good	20 March 2012	9:55 pm	324,000	#1	
170 (8–13)	Is This What You Call Love?	27 March 2012	9:55 pm	285,000	#2	
171 (8–14)	Get Out of My Life	3 April 2012	9:55 pm	306,000	#1	
172 (8–15)	She Needs Me	10 April 2012	9:55 pm	277,000	#1	
173 (8–16)	You Take for Granted	17 April 2012	9:55 pm	295,000	#1	
174 (8–17)	Women and Death	24 April 2012	9:55 pm	329,000	#2	
175 (8–18)	Any Moment	1 May 2012	9:55 pm	332,000	#1	
176 (8–19)	With So Little to Be Sure Of	8 May 2012	9:55 pm	350,000	#1	
177 (8-20)	Lost My Power	15 May 2012	9:55 pm	299,000	#2	
178 (8-21)	The People Will Hear	22 May 2012	10:05 pm*	423,000	#2	
179 (8-22)	Give Me the Blame	29 May 2012	9:55 pm	TBA	TBA	TBA
180 (8-23)	Finishing the Hat	5 June 2012	9:55 pm	431,000	#3	

  - Episode 8-21 airs later than normal due to the first semi final of the Eurovision Song Contest 2012 airing before Desperate Housewives.

== DVD release ==
Desperate Housewives: The Complete Eight and Final Season
Set details	Special features	
23 Episodes; 5-Disc Set; English (Dolby Digital 5.1 surround); English SDH, Spanish & French subtitles; Runtime: 986 minutes; Audio Commentaries	"I Guess This Is Goodbye" - Take one last stroll down Wisteria Lane with members of the Desperate Housewives family as they reflect on what the past eight seasons have meant to them.; Marc Cherry's Audio Commentary on "Finishing the Hat"- Marc Cherry saves the best for last as he shares insights into the show's final episode.; Bloopers; Deleted Scenes	
DVD release dates
Region 1	Region 2	Region 4
September 25, 2012	September 24, 2012	October 3, 2012
