= Secrets That I Never Want to Know =

- Desperate Housewives episode
- Gabrielle (Eva Longoria) and Bree (Marcia Cross) spearhead a plan to cover up a homicide. "Secrets That I Never Want to Know" deals with their attempts to conceal the death and overcome their guilt.
- Episode no.: Season 8 Episode 1
- Directed by: David Grossman
- Written by: Bob Daily
- Production code: 801
- Original air date: September 25, 2011
- Running time: 43 minutes

Guest appearances
- Sam McMurray as Father Dugan; Wendy Benson as Mrs. Henderson; Tony Plana as Alejandro Perez; Emily Happe as Ally; Richard Keith as Jeff; Lonnie Hughes as Shuttle Driver; Cory Belvins as Officer; Michael Blaiklock as Father Benson

Episode chronology
← Previous "Come on Over for Dinner"	Next → "Making the Connection"
- Desperate Housewives season 8

"Secrets That I Never Want to Know" is the eighth-season premiere episode of the American comedy-drama television series Desperate Housewives, and the 158th overall episode of the series. It was originally broadcast in the United States on September 25, 2011, on the American Broadcasting Company (ABC). The episode focuses on the aftermath and cover-up of an accidental killing.

The episode was written by executive producer Bob Daily and directed by David Grossman. In the episode, Bree (Marcia Cross) and Gabrielle (Eva Longoria) work together to conceal the death of Gabrielle's stepfather (Tony Plana) while Susan (Teri Hatcher) and Carlos (Ricardo Antonio Chavira) struggle with their guilt over the cover-up. Meanwhile, Lynette (Felicity Huffman) and Tom (Doug Savant) deal with their separation.

"Secrets That I Never Want to Know" received generally positive reviews from critics, most of whom agreed the episode provided a satisfactory opening to the show's final season. According to Nielsen ratings, the episode drew 9.93 million viewers, making it the least-watched season premiere in the series' history.

== Plot ==
=== Background ===
Desperate Housewives focuses on the lives of residents in the suburban neighborhood of Wisteria Lane, as narrated by their deceased neighbor, Mary Alice Young (Brenda Strong), who kills herself in the pilot episode after receiving a blackmail note. In recent episodes, Bree Van de Kamp (Marcia Cross) begins dating a detective named Chuck Vance (Jonathan Cake). Meanwhile, Lynette (Felicity Huffman) and Tom Scavo (Doug Savant) decide to separate after experiencing problems in their marriage. Carlos Solis (Ricardo Antonio Chavira) accidentally kills his wife Gabrielle's (Eva Longoria) stepfather, Alejandro Perez (Tony Plana), who raped her in her childhood and returns to inflict more harm. Gabrielle's friends, Bree, Lynette, and Susan Delfino (Teri Hatcher), agree to help cover up the killing.

=== Episode ===
Carlos and the women bury Alejandro's body in the nearby woods and, at Bree and Gabrielle's urging, make a pact to keep his death a secret. One month later, Carlos's guilt has left him irritable and depressed. He confesses to having committed an unspecified crime to Father Dugan (Sam McMurray), who tells him that he will only be forgiven if he turns himself in; however, Carlos decides not to follow his advice in order to protect the other people involved in the cover-up.

Meanwhile, Susan's guilt over the cover-up causes her to withdraw from her friends and family. Her husband, Mike Delfino (James Denton), suspects that she is unhappy in their marriage. Susan wants to tell Mike about the cover-up, but Bree and Gabrielle discourage her, warning her that Mike could be implicated if they are ever caught.

Lynette and Tom have decided not to tell their children about their separation. After Lynette has a nightmare about Alejandro, she seeks Tom's company and they sleep together. The next morning, Tom assumes that they are getting back together, but Lynette tells him she still wants to separate. Meanwhile, Renee Perry (Vanessa Williams) attempts to seduce new neighbor Ben Faulkner (Charles Mesure), but he rejects her.

Elsewhere, Bree struggles with dating a detective and covering up Alejandro's death. While trying to dispose of Alejandro's car, Bree and Gabrielle inadvertently attract Chuck's attention and have to create a series of elaborate lies to avoid him finding out the truth. Later, Bree receives a note reading, "I know what you did. It makes me sick. I'm going to tell." This is the same as the letter Mary Alice received before killing herself.

== Production ==
"Secrets That I Never Want to Know" was written by executive producer Bob Daily and directed by David Grossman. Filming for the episode began on July 11, 2011. The episode is only one of two season premieres Cherry did not write himself, as he took on a reduced production role for the eighth season in order to develop several new series while Daily was given more creative authority. According to Daily, the series' ending allowed the writers more artistic freedom while developing storylines. "You get to do story lines that you wouldn't otherwise do because you don't have to worry about the ramifications," he explained. "So people can move, people can die, people can have babies and you don't have to worry about the babies growing up." The episode introduced Bree's blackmail storyline, which recalls the first season's mystery storyline surrounding series narrator Mary Alice's suicide. Daily stated that the similarity between the storylines was intentional: "We’re kind of just diving into the DNA of the series a little bit. Are there any unanswered questions floating around out there? Any characters we need to check in with one more time?" Cherry noted that the "mystery hearkens back to the first season, going back to the roots of Mary Alice [Brenda Strong]. This feels right for that mystery to take us out this year." Brenda Strong commented that "It’s the smartest way to end the series, to finish where you began. I think it really cements it in the psyche of the audience and gives them a sense of completion."

The episode further develops the relationship between Bree and Chuck, which is complicated by her involvement in the cover-up. "Bree’s dilemma is the fact that she’s falling for a cop and trying to cover up this crime that she was sort of the ringleader on," Daily explained. "So her thing is instead of balancing work and pleasure, it’s balancing crime and pleasure." Cross stated, "I think we’ll figure out if that’s really a big love for her or if she’s able to let it go." Jonathan Cake, who appeared as Chuck in four episodes during the seventh season, was promoted to series regular with this episode. On the relationship between Bree and Chuck, Cake stated: "As a detective, he's sort of drawn to this woman who seems both quite proper and conservative and yet can't seem to stop herself from being drawn into these sort of crazy, lurid scenarios. There's a sort of wild streak in Bree somewhere that he thinks is really interesting." To prepare for the role, Cake watched key episodes of the series focusing on Bree's previous relationships.

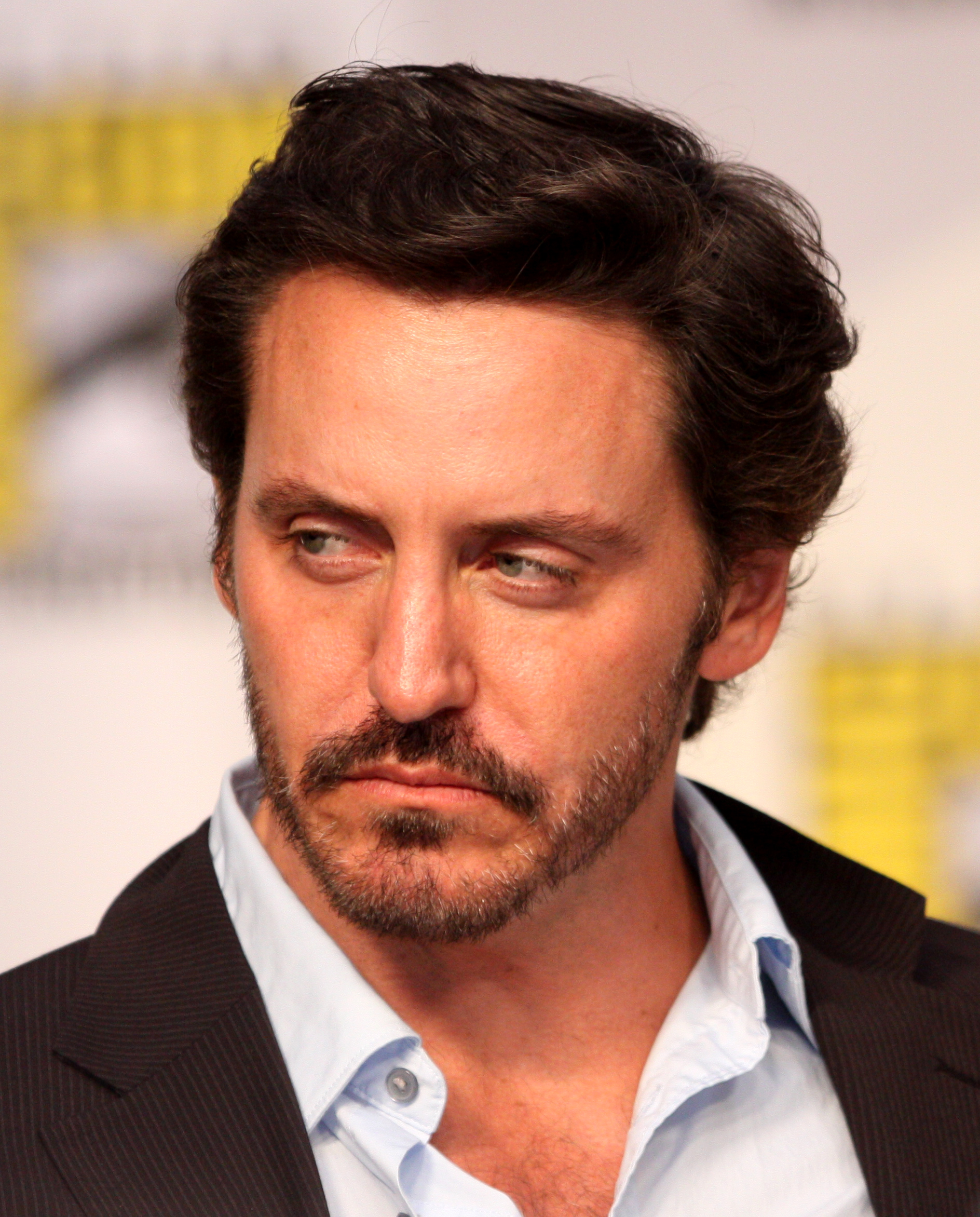
Charles Mesure made his first appearance in the episode as Ben Faulkner, a self-made contractor who moves to Wisteria Lane.

The episode also continues the storyline of Tom and Lynette's separation. Huffman enjoyed her character's storyline, stating: "I'm sure there are things that they knew the viewers want, which is for Tom and Lynette to get back together. But I do like that it's kind of up in the air and maybe they won't." Doug Savant commented, "For many years on this show, we knew that Tom and Lynette were the grounding force on the street. They were the couple that most resembled most couples in America. It just got to a point after so many years when [the writers] really wanted to explore the things that made this relationship work by first pulling it apart." Both actors expressed their desire for the couple to reunite by the series' end. Charles Mesure made his debut as new neighbor Ben Faulkner, a self-made contractor and Renee's new love interest. According to Vanessa Williams, "She’s working hard to make it happen and it’s not happening easily for her. And she’s not used to that and that’s where the comedy ensues and it gives her something to pursue."

== Reception ==
=== Ratings ===
According to Nielsen ratings, "Secrets That I Never Want to Know" was watched by 9.93 million viewers and held a 3.2 rating/7 share among viewers between 18 and 49 years of age. The episode is the least-watched season premiere in the series' history, indicating a 28 percent decrease in viewership from the seventh season premiere one year earlier. The episode was outperformed by Sunday Night Football on NBC, which averaged 20.36 million viewers and an 8.3 rating/21 share, and The Good Wife on CBS, which was watched by 10.66 million viewers but held a 2.2 rating/5 share, 45 percent lower than Desperate Housewives. The episode was also outperformed by its lead-out program, the series premiere of Pan Am. It averaged 1.2 million viewers more than "Secrets That I Never Want to Know", becoming the first lead-out program to outperform Desperate Housewives since Grey's Anatomy in May 2006. The final minute of "Secrets That I Never Want to Know" drew 12.188 million viewers and received a 7.9 rating/12 share overall with 4.1 rating/9 share in the 18 to 49 demographic. The episode gained an additional 2 million viewers and 0.9 rating in the week following the original broadcast due to DVR recordings.

=== Critical reception ===
Overall, the season premiere was comprised of suspense, jokes and touching moments amongst the housewives ... [I]t is absolutely refreshing and nice to have the ladies back.

— Christina Tran, TV Fanatic

"Secrets That I Never Want to Know" received mixed critical reviews. TV Guide's Kate Stanhope gave a mixed review of the episode, opining that "the episode moved a little slow for what was the last season premiere." She praised the sequence in which Bree and Gabrielle attempt to get rid of Alejandro's car, writing, "I always love the Bree-Gaby scenes because they contradict each other in such an interesting way." She enjoyed that the Bree character was "turning back into the controlling perfectionist we grew to love rather than the carefree woman she became" in the seventh season. Stanhope was critical of the Lynette and Tom storyline, opining: "it's annoying that their relationship has been reduced to this gimmick ... I was never on board with the whole Tom and Lynette split simply because it felt less honest and more of a last-ditch effort to cause conflict. But if they're going to go through with separating the formerly stable couple, at least go through with it all the way and show Lynette really and truly on her own." She also believed the Renee storyline to be a waste of Vanessa Williams's talents. Tanner Stransky of Entertainment Weekly called the episode's overall storyline "too juicy a landmine to not have the repercussions play out deliciously on this, the show’s last season."

TV Fanatic's Christina Tran gave the episode a positive review, awarding it 4 out of 5 stars. She picked Susan's hamster burial scene and the scene in which Gabrielle eases Carlos' conscience her favorite scenes in the episode. Tran also appreciated the writers' decision not to prolong Tom and Lynette's attempts to hide their separation, opining: "Last season, their fights were relentless and exhausting. I was glad that this storyline wasn’t dragged out too much, as Tom and Lynette were both able to rip off the band-aid and let their children know of their new status." She also enjoyed the addition of the Ben character and hoped that the Renee character would receive her own storyline this season. John Griffiths of Us Weekly awarded the episode 3.5 out of 4 stars, writing, "After last season's silly antics, the venerable dramedy pulls itself together for a clever final round." He opined that Carlos and Susan's guilt helped keep the cover-up storyline compelling. The Hollywood Reporter's Jethro Nededog was positive in his review of the episode, writing: "It was a strong return, because it relied on the series’ strength, which is the bond these women have with each other." Jamie Heller of The A.V. Club noted that "there’s almost no other plot development" in the episode apart from the cover-up and Lynette and Tom's separation.
