= List of Desperate Housewives characters =

Original and partial ensemble cast of Desperate Housewives. From left to right: Paul Young, Martha Huber, Mary Alice Young, Zach Young, Bree Van de Kamp, Rex Van de Kamp, Lynette Scavo, Tom Scavo, Susan Delfino, Julie Mayer, John Rowland, Gabrielle Solis, Carlos Solis, Edie Britt, and Mike Delfino.

Desperate Housewives is an American comedy-drama series that aired on ABC for eight seasons from October 3, 2004, to May 13, 2012. The focus is on the secret, and often shocking, lives of the residents living on fictional Wisteria Lane, specifically the four living protagonists Susan Mayer (Teri Hatcher), Lynette Scavo (Felicity Huffman), Bree Van de Kamp (Marcia Cross), Gabrielle Solis (Eva Longoria) and the late Mary Alice Young (Brenda Strong), who recently committed suicide. Each episode is narrated by Mary Alice, and from her now unique perspective, she often gives biting commentary. The ensemble cast includes the women's husbands, children, love interests, neighbors, and other acquaintances.

== Main characters ==
The following are characters whose portrayer received "Starring" billing at any point of the series. They are sorted in the order in which they were introduced to the main cast, and not by episode count, screen time, or popularity.

=== Zach Young ===
Zachary "Zach" Young (Cody Kasch) is the son (non-legal) of Paul and Mary Alice. Zach's birth parents are Deirdre Taylor and Mike Delfino; however, this, along with his original name of Dana Taylor, is not revealed until "One Wonderful Day".

Zach is put in a mental institution by his father after his mother's suicide. Zach later runs away and is found hiding in Julie's room, and after they start dating. Whilst at the institution, Zach was diagnosed with clinical depression and a borderline personality disorder. When Julie eventually ends their relationship due to his mental instability, Zach blows up her kitchen.

Zach then goes into hiding, and later Mike and Susan look for him, Mike having realized he is his father. Susan finds him, but when he speaks about reconciling with Julie, she suggests he go to Utah and find Paul and gives him money for the bus fare. Months later, when Paul is arrested, Paul begs Zach to ask his grandfather, Noah Taylor, for money to pay a lawyer. Noah refuses, and Zach turns off Noah's respirator, killing him. After, he finds that he has inherited a vast fortune and no longer wants anything to do with Paul. Zach moves to his grandfather's mansion.

Zach reappears in season three as Gabrielle's secret admirer. Zach unsuccessfully tries to impress Gabrielle with luxurious gifts and his wealth. After getting her drunk, Zach lets her believe that they had sex, which she cannot remember. Gabrielle then asks Carlos to scare Zach off, and Carlos realizes that Zach and Gaby had not slept together, after accidentally seeing Zach's penis at the urinals, and telling Gaby that if they had sex, she would have remembered. Later Zach proposes at Scavo's Pizzeria but Gabrielle declines as she does not want a relationship with him.

Zach returns in season seven, shooting Paul at the end of the episode "Down the Block There's a Riot". He first appears as a delivery guy delivering flowers to Bree. Later in the episode, a gun matching the one used to shoot Paul is found on Bree's couch after Zach planted it there. It's revealed that Zach is now addicted to drugs and gambling and has lost his entire fortune on both. Paul and Mike both momentarily put their differences aside to help Zach by placing him in a rehab clinic for treatment, where he remains for the rest of the series.

=== Karl Mayer ===
Karl Mayer (Richard Burgi) is the ex-husband of housewife Susan and father of Julie, as well as a successful practitioner of family law. According to Cherry, casting the role of Karl was difficult because he "wanted a guy that was nice looking and seemed like he would have been married to Teri, but was also someone you wouldn't like." The character was portrayed by another actor in a series of non-speaking flashbacks in the pilot episode, but the role was recast once the direction of the character changed. After making some guest appearances during the first season, Burgi joined the regular cast in the second season. However, he returned to his guest starring status from the third season until his character's death halfway through the sixth season. Burgi returned for the series finale, appearing as his character's ghost among other deceased characters.

Karl was born in 1963. He married Susan and a year later their daughter, Julie, was born. In 1992, he moved with his wife and daughter to Fairview, 4353 Wisteria Lane. Eleven years later, Karl cheated on Susan with Edie Britt and his secretary Brandi. After discovering his affair with Brandi, his wife filed for divorce with the court and kicked him out of the house, changing the locks. When Brandi cheats on him, he goes to Susan to ask for a second chance, but she declines because of her commitment to Mike Delfino. Later, he begins a relationship with Edie.

In the second season, Susan discovers that Karl is now living with Edie. However, he continues trying to get back with Susan, as he is still in love with her. Eventually he lies to Susan, claiming him and Edie are broken up, and they sleep together. Later in the season, when Susan finds out she needs to have a surgical operation to correct a wandering spleen, Karl offers to marry Susan so that she can use his health insurance to pay for it, but they plan to divorce soon after Susan's surgery. Karl becomes jealous of Susan and Dr. Ron McCready's relationship and sabotages it. Later on, Karl asks Edie to marry him; however, when Edie learns of his sham marriage with Susan, she demands that Karl throws her a lavish wedding. However, when she discovers they had also slept together, Edie burns Susan's house down, prompting Karl to buy her a new one. Karl eventually leaves Edie before the marriage.

Karl eventually marries a woman named Marissa (played by Sunny Mabrey) and even has a child with her, teasing Susan about his new life. After the five-year time jump between the fourth and fifth seasons, Karl has enrolled his son Evan in Susan's art class, where she learns Marissa has left Karl because she could not handle being a mother, leaving him to raise Evan by himself. The experience has led Karl to come to understanding the ramifications of his infidelities during his marriage to Susan. Susan sympathizes with him,. Bree later hires Karl as her divorce lawyer, and he helps her stage a fake burglary of her house to hide assets that she does not want Orson to have access to. When Orson finds out about the scheme and blackmails Bree into staying in the marriage, Karl and Bree begin an affair.

Karl and Bree continue their affair during the first part of the sixth season. Karl decides to propose to Bree during the annual Christmas party using an engine plane with a banner reading "Will you marry me, Bree? Love, Karl" flying over Wisteria Lane. At the party, Karl and Orson fight inside Santa's Workshop, until the pilot of the plane Karl hired suffers a fatal heart attack at the controls. The plane subsequently crash-lands into the party, smashing straight into the workshop, killing Karl. In the following episode, Susan and Bree both wonders what life would have been like if they had continued relationships with Karl.

Karl appears in the series finale, "Finishing the Hat", as one of the ghosts that watch Susan and her family leave Wisteria Lane.

=== Ana Solis ===
Ana Solis (Maiara Walsh) is the granddaughter of Carlos' Aunt Connie. Ana arrives to Wisteria Lane in the fifth-season finale to live with Carlos and his family when her grandmother could not take care of Ana anymore. They eventually become her legal guardians.

Later, Ana gets a job working for John Rowland, Gabrielle's ex-lover, and develops a crush on him, until Gabrielle confesses to her about her past affair with John after Ana witnesses him kissing her, and she quits her job.

Ana begins to date Danny, but Gabrielle sends Ana to New York to protect her after hearing Angie and Nick argue about their dangerous past. By the end of season 6, Ana remains in New York City, and Danny leaves to be with her.

=== Bob Hunter and Lee McDermott ===
Bob Hunter (Tuc Watkins) and Lee McDermott (Kevin Rahm) are the first gay couple to live on the fictitious Wisteria Lane. They first appeared in the season four episode "If There's Anything I Can't Stand" on October 21, 2007. Within the series, Bob is an attorney, and Lee is a real estate agent. At the end of season 7, they adopt a 10-year-old daughter named Jenny.

Prior to the fourth season of Desperate Housewives, the series' sole leading gay character was Andrew Van de Kamp, whom critics noted as having a minimal role in season three. In July 2007, two months before the premiere of season four, series creator Marc Cherry announced that a gay couple would be moving to Wisteria Lane around the fifth episode of the new season. Cherry named the characters after ABC journalist Bob Woodruff and his wife, Lee, and based them on his own experiences and interactions with neighbors as a gay man. Cherry decided not to make the new characters "issue-oriented" and treat them like the heterosexual couples on the series. Actor Tuc Watkins was cast in the recurring role of Bob in August 2007, having previously auditioned for the role of Adam Mayfair for the series only a few weeks earlier. Kevin Rahm, who was cast as Bob's partner Lee, originally auditioned for Bob.

Both Watkins and Rahm were promoted from recurring guest stars to series regulars for the seventh season. However, for the eighth and final season of the series, both of them were demoted to "Also starring".

=== Chuck Vance ===
Chuck Vance (Jonathan Cake) is introduced in the seventh season as the investigator in charge of keeping an eye on Felicia Tilman who has moved back onto the lane. He begins dating Bree Van de Kamp until she discovers he is still married, though he had filed for divorce a year ago. When Bree confronts Chuck with this information, Chuck retaliates by telling her he had also run a background check on her. After an argument, they make up and continue to date. In the seventh season finale, Lee tells Bree he recognizes Chuck as a gay man he has seen in local gay bars. Bree drops in on him at the police station, and her suspicions deepen, leading her to believe Chuck's marriage has broken down because he is gay. After a dinner date, Bree insists Chuck take her to a gay bar, where several patrons and a waiter recognize him. Chuck tells her he had worked undercover in the bar, and discloses his marriage broke down because his wife had been having an affair with his police partner.

In the eighth season, Bree continues her relationship with Chuck, but she fears that he might discover what happened with Alejandro in "Come on Over for Dinner", so she breaks up with him on the same night Chuck had planned to propose to her. Chuck is later given a missing person report for Alejandro. Chuck recalls seeing Alejandro at Wisteria Lane the night of the progressive party, so he guesses that Bree is involved in the case. Chuck investigates while harassing Bree and her friends, in an attempt to get revenge and make Bree suffer. Chuck is close to discover the truth until he is run over and killed by Orson. Chuck appears amongst other deceased characters in the series finale.

=== Ben Faulkner ===
Ben Faulkner (Charles Mesure) is an Australian real estate developer who moves to Wisteria Lane in the final season. He attracts Renee's attention, and they eventually begin dating. Bree comes to volunteer at Ben's soup kitchen and helps him get the right to build his houses for the poor in the woods, but she later finds out that it is the same place that the girls buried Alejandro. Bree first tries to prevent Ben from building the houses there, but after Ben finds the corpse, Bree decides to reveal the secret to him, and asks Mike to bury it under the concrete foundations at the site.

Ben has a financial crisis and decides to do business with a loan shark but later has trouble paying him back. After a stress-related attack, he is taken to the hospital. Mike tells Renee about the situation with the loan shark, so she pays off the loan shark behind Ben's back.

Ben decides to propose to Renee, but he gets arrested when the police find Alejandro's body at his construction site. Renee gets the ring on her finger before he is taken in for questioning. Ben is let go, but when Bree is thanking Ben for covering up the murder, the cops are listening in to their phone call. Renee confronts Ben after finding out that Ben is on the witness list for Bree's trial, but Ben tells her he cannot tell her anything because he does not want to put her at risk. Ben goes to the trial but refuses to speak. He is arrested and jailed until he speaks, and the prosecutor threatens Renee with sending him back to Australia unless she confesses what she knows. In the end, Bree is exonerated, and Ben finally marries Renee.

=== Juanita Solis ===
Juanita Solis (Kaili Say in season 4 and Madison De La Garza from season 5 onwards) is the legal daughter of Gabrielle and Carlos Solis born in the 5-year gap between seasons 4 and 5. Kaili Say was originally cast to play Juanita as seen by the end of season 4's final episode. However, Madison De La Garza replaced her from season 5 onwards. She is named after Carlos' late mother.

In Season 7, Carlos learns that Juanita was switched at birth with Grace Sanchez (Ceci Balagot), and that her biological parents are Hector and Carmen Sanchez (Ronaldo Molina and Carla Jimenez, respectively). Upon discovering the switch, Gabrielle tracks down her biological daughter, Grace. Unaware of the truth, Juanita is jealous of the attention her mother bestows on Grace. When Juanita's biological parents turn out to be illegal immigrants, Grace is forced to leave with them, causing Gabrielle to be heartbroken. She tries to get through her feelings by writing a note to Grace but Juanita finds it and discovers the truth. She yells at Gabrielle and even shoves her down before fleeing the house, ending up in the back of Lee's car during the riot caused by Paul. When the car is attacked as part of a riot, Juanita is nearly hurt but is rescued by Gabrielle and Carlos and appears ready to forgive her parents.

De La Garza is promoted to "Starring" status in the eighth season, but only in the episodes she appears in.

== Secondary characters ==
The following are characters whose portrayer received "Also starring" billing at any point of the series, but never received "Starring" billing. They are sorted in the order in which they were introduced to the cast, and not by episode count, screen time or popularity.

=== Danielle Van de Kamp ===
Danielle Van de Kamp (Joy Lauren) is the daughter of Bree and Rex Van de Kamp, and Andrew's younger sister.

After being broken up with by John Rowland, she begins dating Matthew Applewhite, who has recently moved to Wisteria Lane. Danielle is an accomplice to Matthew's scheme to have Caleb "put down" and frees Danielle when his mother catches him. The two pack to run away while Betty and Bree race to stop them. When Bree confronts the kids, Matthew threatens to kill Bree, as Danielle pleads for her mother's life. Matthew is killed by a police sniper, and Bree and Danielle tentatively reconcile.

Later, Danielle has a brief affair with her history teacher, until she is dumped by him. She reveals their affair to her teacher's wife, going as far as to get him fired and possibly criminally charged. Soon afterward Danielle begins another affair with Austin McCann, eventually blackmailing him with telling Julie about their relationship if he tries to end it.

When Danielle discovers she is pregnant with Austin's child, Bree and Orson take Danielle to a convent, and tell others that Danielle is studying abroad. Bree pretends she is pregnant, intending to raise her grandchild herself. Danielle eventually gives birth at home to a baby boy named Benjamin, during a Halloween party. The next morning she gives Bree the baby and leaves to attend college in Miami.

During the five-year gap in the series, Danielle had returned for her son, leaving Bree devastated. After several years but finally agrees to bring her son and new husband, Leo Katz, a lawyer, to visit. Bree constantly criticizes the way Danielle is raising Benjamin, including their vegetarianism, homeschooling, and practicing Judaism. An angry Danielle departs early along with her family, leaving her relationship with her mother strained once again.

By the end of the series, she has gotten divorced and started an online business selling exercise equipment. Bree soon discovers she is selling "sex swings" and while angry, she decides eventually to support her daughter in hopes of bridging the gap between them.

=== Caleb and Matthew Applewhite ===
Caleb (Page Kennedy, replaced by NaShawn Kearse) and Matthew Applewhite (Mehcad Brooks; in flashbacks portrayed by Hendrix Henrie-Erhahon) are Betty Applewhite's sons. Through conversations and flashbacks, it is revealed that prior to moving to Fairview, Matthew was dating a young woman named Melanie Foster. He had tried to break up with her, but Melanie asked him to meet her at a lumber yard. Caleb arrived first, and after telling Melanie he loves her, he tried to kiss her, but she slapped him and then hit him with an axe. Frightened, Caleb took the axe and hit Melanie in the head. When she fell to the ground, Caleb fled, thinking he had killed her. Matthew arrived later to find Melanie injured but alive. He tried to convince her that Caleb acted out of fear and would not intentionally hurt her, but she told him she would go to the police unless Matthew agreed to resume their relationship. As she walked away, he bludgeoned her with the axe, killing her. However, because Caleb arrived home first with blood on his hands, Betty is convinced it is he who murdered Melanie.

In Fairview, Betty insists on keeping Caleb locked in the basement, wanting to protect him from the authorities. One day, however, Caleb manages to escape and sneaks into Gabrielle's house. While searching for Caleb, Matthew meets Danielle Van de Kamp, who flirts with him and suggests they date. Knowing he himself is really Melanie's killer and wanting to help his brother, Matthew tries to convince Betty to allow Caleb to live upstairs. As Gabrielle has admitted, Caleb had the chance but chose not to hurt her and that his only crime was stealing a bowl of ice cream. Betty eventually concedes. Bree is displeased with Matthew and Danielle's relationship when she learns about Melanie's murder from Betty. Forbidden to see each other, Matthew and Danielle decide Caleb is the problem and devise a plan to get him out of their way. Matthew tells Caleb that Danielle likes him and wants to kiss him. Caleb goes to the Van De Kamp house and into Danielle's room, where Danielle screams for Bree. Bree enters with her gun and frightens Caleb away. Betty realizes she cannot control Caleb and decides to kill him peacefully by crushing pills into a bowl of ice cream. As Caleb eats the ice cream, he tells his mother that Matthew had told him to go to Danielle's room. Furious, Betty takes the ice cream from Caleb and locks Matthew in the basement, but he is soon freed by Danielle. Betty learns that Matthew is really Melanie's killer and informs Bree, who rushes home to find Danielle and Matthew with money they have just taken from her safe. Betty alerts the police, while a standoff ensues between Matthew and Bree. After Matthew threatens to kill Bree, he is shot in the heart by a police sniper before he can pull the trigger. Following Matthew's death, Betty and Caleb leave Wisteria Lane.

=== Preston and Porter Scavo ===
Preston and Porter Scavo (Brent and Shane Kinsman seasons 1 to 5, Max and Charlie Carver seasons 5 to 8) are Lynette's oldest twin sons. They are shown to be very rebellious, much to the distress of their parents. Their uncontrollable nature leads to hints that they may have ADHD.

In Season 5, they have continued their mischievous ways in forms such as underage drinking, smoking, and joyrides in their family's cars. However, it appears that the twins are showing signs of growing up and following their parents' rules. It is discovered later in the season that Porter was having an affair with his best friend's mother, Anne Schilling. She ultimately leaves town, and Porter is accused of starting the fire at Warren Schilling's club, although the charges are later dropped.

In Season 6, Preston leaves to backpack in Europe for a year, whilst Porter continues living at home to attend Fairview Community College. Later, Preston returns in the episode with a fiancée from Russia named Irina Korsakov, who he leaves after discovering her deceit. Eventually, with both twins living at home again, Lynette and Tom agree that it is time for them to find their own place. The boys briefly move in with Mrs. McCluskey until she kicks the twins out after a house party.

In the final season, it is announced that Porter is the father of Julie's baby. In "Finishing the Hat", his and Julie's baby is born.

=== Parker Scavo ===
Parker Scavo (Zane Huett seasons 1 to 4, Joshua Logan Moore season 5 to 8) is the youngest son of Lynette and Tom. He, just like all of Lynette's kids, drives her crazy with his unruliness and rebellious nature. In the first season, Parker stays at home while his brothers are in school. In season two, Parker starts school, although he struggles with his mom's absence with work.

He gets along very well with his half-sister, Kayla, and is most connected to McCluskey, especially when she is victim of rumors that she killed her husband, convincing her to tell everybody the truth. He gets buried alive in McCluskey's house during the tornado and is the second one to be pulled out of it. He was disgusted to learn his parents were still having sex after they tell the family Lynette is pregnant again. In "Lovely" he and his friends are doing a peeping tom on Robin in the shower. It is later revealed that he offered money to sleep with her, which she declined. His parents later had a talk with him, with Tom reassuring Parker that he will have sex when the time is right.

=== George Williams ===
George Williams (Roger Bart) is a pharmacist who begins a relationship with Bree Van de Kamp after she discovers her husband Rex's affair. George becomes increasingly obsessed with Bree, until he begins tampering with Rex's heart medication, substituting it with dangerous amounts of potassium, ultimately leading to Rex's death in the episode "One Wonderful Day."

After Rex's death, George proposes to a reluctant Bree, but she accepts. After she refuses to wear her ring, George learns Bree's therapist, Dr. Goldfine, has suggested Bree slow things down in their relationship. He attacks Dr. Goldfine, throwing him over a bridge while he is jogging. He survives the attack and is hospitalized.

After George places an engagement announcement in the newspaper, his ex-fiancée, Leila Mitzman, warns Bree that George is unstable. However, George claims that it is Leila who is obsessed with him.

After a fight at a restaurant about Bree not wearing her ring, wherein he assaulted her old college boyfriend, she ends the engagement and orders George to leave. Later, when Bree realizes that George was the one who attacked Dr. Goldfine. She notifies the police, and George retreats to a hotel where Bree is co-hosting a charity event. He sends her a note through a bellman telling her he is committing suicide, and includes his room number, hoping Bree will come to save him. Bree goes to his room but refuses to call for help when George declines to take responsibility for Rex's death. George dies from overdosing on pills.

George appears amongst other deceased characters in the series finale.

=== Austin McCann ===
Austin McCann (Josh Henderson) is Edie's troubled teenage nephew. When Edie catches him trying to break into her house, she lets him stay with her for some time instead of going to Mexico like he was planning to. He is instantly attracted to Julie, and they begin a relationship after both being held hostage by Carolyn Bigsby. However, it is revealed that Austin has also been sleeping with Danielle Van De Kamp, who blackmails him into continuing the affair. However, when Edie and Susan catch Austin and Danielle having sex, Susan tells Julie, which ends their relationship.

Later, he discovers that he got Danielle pregnant just when he managed to mend his relationship with Julie. Orson tells Austin he needs to leave town. Although Austin initially refuses, Andrew points out that sooner or later he would just hurt Julie again, and Austin agrees to leave.

=== Dylan Mayfair ===
Dylan Mayfair (Lyndsy Fonseca) is Katherine's daughter. Dylan has no memory of her childhood or Wisteria Lane, or Julie Mayer who insists they used to play together as children.

One day, Dylan is driving, and a police officer pulls her over for speeding. Later, she finds out he is her father, Wayne, who she always thought had died. Wayne asks Dylan not to tell Katherine that they have met, and they secretly meet a few times for dinner.

Wayne later discovers that Dylan is not his daughter, and Katherine explains the truth (See Katherine Mayfair).

In the fifth season Katherine reveals that Dylan has married and that she and her husband, Bradley, have had a baby. It is learned that Dylan and her family live in Baltimore.

She makes her return to Wisteria Lane in Season 6, when her mother intentionally stabs herself. Katherine had told Dylan that she was married to Mike, and that Susan had stabbed her; however, after Susan shows Dylan her wedding album, Dylan realizes that her mother has been lying to her and living in delusion. When Dylan confronts her mother, Katherine goes into a full-blown meltdown and both Susan and Dylan watch as she is restrained.

=== Kayla Huntington Scavo ===
Kayla Scavo (Rachel Fox) née Huntington is the daughter of Tom Scavo and Nora Huntington, and stepdaughter of Lynette. Tom reveals that he has just found out that a one-night stand twelve years ago (prior to meeting Lynette) had resulted in the birth of Kayla. Lynette tries to include Kayla in their family, but it becomes increasingly difficult due to Nora's hostility. Kayla's true sociopathic personality does not emerge until after Nora's death, which causes Kayla to move in with the Scavo's full-time.

In season four, Kayla seems to be closer to Lynette and fits in perfectly with the rest of the Scavo family. Later on in the season, however, she becomes more crafty and psychotic when she persuades Porter and Preston to set fire to Rick Coletti's rival pizza joint, and tricks Preston into jumping off the roof of the house by pretending that she had safely done so herself by using an umbrella as a parachute. Lynette takes Kayla to a therapist, who tells Lynette that she and Kayla should spend more time together, so Lynette takes her shopping. Kayla blackmails her to get what she wants in the store, and she then threatens to hurt Penny, causing Lynette to slap her. Later, Kayla calls her therapist and tells him that Lynette has repeatedly hit her many times before. These accusations bring Child Protective Services to the Scavo home. After intentionally overhearing the conversation between the Scavo's and their lawyer, she hears that Lynette could lose her rights of parental custody over her children. Kayla proceeds by burning herself with a curling iron, claiming Lynette did it to her, and leading to Lynette's arrest. Later that night Tom tricks Kayla into confessing everything, while her therapist listens to their conversation. Kayla insists that Tom has to let her stay within the family household, but Tom decides to call Nora's parents, and Kayla is forced to move away and live with her grandparents.

=== Penny Scavo ===
Penelope Lynne Scavo (Dylan and Jordan Cline - season 1; Darien and Kerstin Pinkerton - seasons 2–4; Kendall Applegate - season 5 and 6; Darcy Rose Byrnes - season 7 and 8) is Lynette and Tom's fourth child and first daughter. She has her first line in the season three episode "God, That's Good". She is the most well-behaved out of Lynette's children.

Penny plays a more active role in the series after the 5-year jump between seasons 4 and 5. She learns she is going to be a big sister when Lynette becomes pregnant again in season 6, and becomes jealous of the new baby. In the episode "The Chase" she celebrates her 11th birthday, but Tom and Lynette forget it. They rush to plan a party, resulting in a birthday dinner with only half the family there, and a cake with the name "Polly" on it. Upset, Penny uses her parents' credit card to check herself in a hotel. Lynette discovers this when Penny does not come home from school, and one of Penny's friends gives her mom a note explaining that she ran away. When baby Paige is born, Penny has a change of attitude and even helps Lynette babysit Paige in "The Thing That Counts is What's Inside", taking her to school with her. Throughout season eight, Penny helps Lynette try to win Tom back many times.

=== Nick Bolen ===
Nick Bolen (formerly Dominic; Jeffrey Nordling) is the husband of Angie Bolen. He had a brief affair with Julie, leading him to be a suspect for her strangling. Angie finds out about the affair when the police calls her, and she lies and provides him an alibi. Angie forgives him after punching him in the face.

Later, Patrick Logan arrives to Wisteria Lane, he runs Nick over. Gabrielle visits Nick in the hospital and shows him the note that Angie left her, and he leaves the hospital with her. However, Nick passes out in Gabrielle's car due to the influence of pain pills. After Patrick is killed, Nick and Angie leave Wisteria Lane and move to Atlanta to remain in hiding.

=== Danny Bolen ===
Danny Bolen (formerly Tyler; Beau Mirchoff) is the son of Angie and Nick Bolen. He comments that he did not want to move to Fairview, to which his mother replied "Oh, honey. Whose fault was that?" He has feelings for Julie, but is prone to random fits of anger around her, and thus becomes a suspect after Julie is strangled. Danny confronts his father after he discovers his father's affair with Julie. After Julie tells Danny she will never be with him, he attempts to commit suicide, but fails. Later at the hospital, he is being looked after by Nurse Mona Clarke, who lives on Wisteria Lane. When Mona calls him by name, a dazed Danny says that his name is Tyler. He starts dating Ana Solis, which concerns Angie, as she is afraid that Ana is going to break his heart someday. He goes to New York City to talk with Ana about her supposed modeling job and reconnects with his grandmother. It also revealed that Patrick Logan is his biological father, but he does not know this and thinks of Nick as his real dad. Patrick meets Danny Patrick in episode "We All Deserve to Die", and tells Danny that he is writing a novel, which in reality is the story of how Patrick and Angie met. Patrick asks Danny for advice on how to "end the novel" and Danny, believing it is all fiction, suggests that the main character kill "the girl", for taking away the main character's kid (who takes the role of Danny). When Patrick runs Nick over, Angie tells Danny to escape, and though she reveals Patrick's past as an eco-terrorist, she misses out the important fact of their relationship. Danny is about to leave town, but is tricked by Patrick into returning, and is held hostage along with Angie. Patrick reveals to Danny the truth about his paternity. Patrick attempts to kill Danny by making Angie build a bomb and placing it in the Bolens' house; however, Angie planted the bomb within the detonator and Patrick is killed, while Danny is saved by Gabrielle. Later, while Angie and Nick relocate to Atlanta, Danny is seen relocating to New York to be with his grandmother and Ana.

=== Maynard James "M.J." Delfino ===
M.J. Delfino (Mason Vale Cotton) is Susan and Mike's son. He is born on Mother's Day in the fourth season episode "Mother Said", shortly before the five-year time jump. His first name honors Mike's maternal grandfather and second name, his paternal grandfather.

M.J. is shy, quiet, and like his mother when she was younger, is an underachiever who struggles in school due to his lack of intelligence and common sense, prompting Susan and Mike to enroll him in private school. When Mike begins dating Katherine, M.J. resents their relationship; however, he grows fond of Katherine as her romance with Mike progresses. M.J. becomes the target of a murder scheme when Dave Williams wants revenge on Susan for killing his wife and daughter in a car accident several years earlier. However, Dave spares M.J.'s life after experiencing overwhelming guilt.

The eighth and final season sees Mike being killed and M.J. and Susan dealing with the loss. M.J. is generally depicted in a bad temper because he feels like the other children at school think of him as a "weird kid" for not having a father anymore. M.J. and his family eventually leave Wisteria Lane in the series finale, due to his half-sister Julie's new baby.

== Recurring characters ==
The following are characters whose portrayer received "Guest starring" billing at any point of the series, but never received "Starring" or "Also starring" billing. Only those relevant characters that appeared in two or more seasons, or in a major story arc during one season, are included. They are sorted first by the season in which they were introduced and then by the episode in which they first appeared.

=== Introduced in season one ===
==== Martha Huber ====
Martha Huber (Christine Estabrook) lives at 4350 Wisteria Lane. She first appears in the pilot episode as a nosey neighbor who discovers Mary Alice's body after the latter commits suicide. When Edie's house burns down, Martha discovers a measuring cup that Edie said was not hers in the ruins, making Martha curious. When she finds a new measuring cup in Susan's groceries, she realizes that Susan burned Edie's house down. Martha consequently blackmails Susan until Susan and her daughter, Julie, break into Martha's home to retrieve the cup and destroy it.

Later, it is revealed that Martha discovered Mary Alice's secret. Martha decides to solve her financial difficulties by blackmailing Mary Alice by letter, but Mary Alice commits suicide after receiving it. Mary Alice's friends find the note when packing up her belongings and give it to Paul. He hires a private eye/hit man to discover who was responsible and kill them. After discovering Martha had stationary matching the note, Paul confronts her. She explains that she was desperate for money, and Mary Alice killed herself because of "what she did to that poor baby (Zach Young)". In a rage, Paul kills Martha by bludgeoning her with the blender and strangling her. He then buries her next to a forest hiking trail.

Martha Huber has made few appearances since season one. In season five, she appears gossiping to the residents of Wisteria Lane about finding Mary Alice Young's body. Martha was seen again in the season seven premiere episode "Remember Paul?" via flashbacks. At the end of the same season, Paul finally confesses to her murder and is arrested. She again appeared in the series finale "Finishing the Hat" in a flashback to when Mary Alice arrived on the Lane, and later as among a group of the deceased who watch Susan leave.

==== Noah Taylor ====
Noah Taylor (Bob Gunton) is Dierdre's father who holds a vast fortune and heavy influence over several police officers in the city. Noah finances Mike's mission to discover what happened to Dierdre. Throughout the first season, he often checks on Mike's progress, and briefly fires Mike when he feels his focus has been pulled. He simultaneously discovers that he has a cancerous tumor and only has one more year to live. Noah is on bed rest as his imminent death draws near. Eventually, Noah learns that Mike has been keeping Zach's existence a secret. He demands to see Zach, but Mike stalls until Zach and Paul can leave town. In retaliation, Noah orders a rogue cop named Detective Sullivan (Nick Chinlund) to kill Paul, but he is unsuccessful. When Paul is framed for Felicia Tilman's murder, Zach attempts to secure his bail money from Noah, who refuses to provide it. This prompts Zach to shut off Noah's life support and subsequently inherits his entire fortune.

The character was named after John Huston's character, Noah Cross, in the film Chinatown. Gunton was selected for the role because of his performance as Juan Perón in the original Broadway production of Evita.

==== Albert Goldfine ====
Dr. Albert Goldfine (Sam Lloyd) is hailed as the number one marriage counsellor in Fairview. Rex and Bree begin seeing him in the second episode of Season 1, "Ah, But Underneath". During appointments, Bree frequently makes small talk with Dr. Goldfine, and during a private session, she fixes a loose a button on his jacket. Goldfine becomes captivated by her domesticity and later asks Rex if he has ever thanked Bree for the things she does around the house, to Rex's chagrin. In episode "Love Is in the Air", he encourages Bree to ask Rex about his true sexual feelings, refusing to divulge Rex's desire for domination despite being flustered by Bree's openness about her love of sex. He returns in the second season when Bree needs advice regarding her feelings about being widowed and about her relationship with George Williams. When George finds out that Goldfine has been advising Bree to take their relationship slowly, he lies in wait for Goldfine, slamming his head into a concrete barrier and throwing him over a bridge. Goldfine survives and informs Bree his attacker had a blue bike.

==== Ida Greenberg ====
Ida Greenberg (Pat Crawford Brown) is a neighbor on Wisteria Lane, who is close friends with Mrs. McCluskey. She first appears in the episode, "Come In, Stranger", as a neighbor at the watch-meeting complaining that somebody was watching her whenever she took a shower. She is shown to struggle with alcoholism. When Mike awakes from his coma, Ida's nephew, Dr. Lee Craig (Terry Bozeman), tells her about this, and she starts spreading the news around Wisteria Lane. When a neighborhood meeting is done for elections of the street president, Ida objects against Bob and Lee, not because of their fountain, but because they are gay. During the tornado warning, she takes cover in Mrs. McCluskey's basement with the Scavo's, but she dies sacrificing herself to save Lynette's children and husband. After her death, it is revealed that Ida was a professional baseball player during World War II. Her ashes are scattered by Lynette and Mrs. McCluskey at a baseball field where she had her glory days.

==== Juanita "Mama" Solis ====
Juanita "Mama" Solis (Lupe Ontiveros) is the nosy mother of Carlos who is convinced that Gabrielle was cheating on him. Her suspicions proved true when she discovered Gabrielle's affair with John Rowland, and she manages to obtain photographic evidence of the affair moments before being accidentally run over by Andrew Van de Kamp. She remained in a coma for five months before awakening, only to fall to her death down a flight of stairs at the hospital. Before dying, Mama told a nurse of Gabrielle's infidelity; however, the nurse could not hear her because she was wearing headphones and listening to loud music.

Mama returns in the series finale watching Susan as she leaves the lane.

==== Deirdre Taylor ====
Deirdre Taylor (Jolie Jenkins) is Mike's ex-girlfriend. Her death occurred before the series' timeline and plays an integral role in the first season mystery, which focuses on Mary Alice's suicide. Deirdre came from a wealthy family but rejected it after becoming addicted to drugs as a young adult. During this time, she dated Mike, a drug dealer at the time. Their relationship ended after Mike was incarcerated for killing a corrupt police officer who attempted to rape Deirdre. Soon after, Deirdre gave birth to Mike's son without his knowledge. She later sold her son to Mary Alice, who worked as a nurse in a rehabilitation facility in Utah. Mary Alice and Paul fled town and raised Deirdre's child as their own. Years later, Deirdre tracked down the Young family and attempted to take the child, Zach, back, but Mary Alice killed her in an attempt to stop her. Mary Alice and Paul chopped up Deirdre's body and buried it underneath the cement of their swimming pool.

Although Jenkins did not appear onscreen until the first-season finale, which was filmed in April 2005, she was cast in the fall of 2004 because earlier episodes required photographs of the Deirdre character. Because no material had been written for the character at the time of casting, Jenkins did not have to audition for the role.

==== Father Crowley ====
Father Crowley (Jeff Doucette) is the priest at the local Catholic church. Gabrielle is openly rude to him. He first appeared on "Guilty" when he prayed for "Mama" Solis, who was in a coma at the time. Father Crowley and Gabrielle clash after John told him about the affair. He appears on "Fear No More" when Gabrielle confessed her pregnancy and her unawareness of who the father is. He tells her to be thankful since children are a blessing. Father Crowley then appears on "There's Something About a War" when Gabrielle asked him to transfer Sister Mary. He is the one who informs Gabrielle in "Silly People" that Xiao-Mei will be staying with them briefly. His next appearance is in Season 5 when Gabrielle forces Juanita to work at the soup kitchen where Father Crowley is volunteering. He appears in season 6 when Gabrielle attempted to get Juanita into Catholic school, and he is also shown presiding over Karl's funeral.

==== Alejandro Perez ====
Alejandro Perez, aka Ramon Sanchez (Tony Plana) is the stepfather of Gabrielle who was sexually abusive towards her when she was a child. He is shown briefly in season 1 via flashback, illustrating how he had assaulted Gabrielle. He is the second husband of Gabrielle's mother, Lucia Marquez (María Conchita Alonso). When Gabrielle told Lucia what Alejandro did to her, Lucia believed that Gabrielle seduced Alejandro, causing Gabrielle to run away from home.

Gabrielle believed Alejandro to be dead, so in the seventh season she went to her hometown to read a letter over his grave; but she ends up not going to the grave. Towards the end of the season, however, Alejandro appears in Wisteria Lane stalking Gabrielle. In the season finale, Alejandro confronts Gabrielle, who almost kills him but cannot go through with it. She tells him to never come back. When Alejandro returns and assaults Gabrielle, Carlos hits him over the head, accidentally killing him. The housewives cover up the incident by burying the body in the forest.

It is later revealed that sometime after Gabrielle left home, Alejandro left Lucia, changed his name to "Ramon Sanchez", and married Claudia Sanchez (Justina Machado). She discovers that Alejandro also sexually abused Claudia's daughter Marisa (Daniela Bobadilla).

==== Justin ====
Justin (Ryan Carnes) is Andrew's first boyfriend. Justin first appears in season one as John Rowland's classmate. Justin has not yet come to terms with his sexuality and tries to blackmail Gabrielle into having sex with him to prove to himself that he is not gay. After she helps him accept his sexuality, his relationship with Andrew becomes more serious. However, Justin is later beaten up by Carlos, who mistakenly believes he is having an affair with Gabrielle.

In season two, Andrew forces Justin to hit him and passes off the bruises as having been inflicted by Bree. Later, Justin is heartbroken when he finds out Andrew is planning to move to Rhode Island with his grandparents. He tells Bree he loves Andrew because when his parents kicked him out after discovering he was gay, Andrew had helped through it. Bree then persuades Justin to supply her with gay magazines and videos, which she plants among Andrew's things for his grandparents to find so that they will not take him to Rhode Island. Having seen Justin's love for Andrew, Bree becomes more accepting of their relationship and regularly invites him to dinner.

==== Felicia Tilman ====
Felicia Tilman (Harriet Sansom Harris) is Martha Huber's sister, who comes to Wisteria Lane after Martha goes missing. She knows that her sister is dead and has come to uncover who is behind her sister's murder. After finding and reading Martha's journals, Felicia discovered that Martha was blackmailing Mary Alice. Felicia then realizes that it was Paul who had murdered her sister and confronts him. Felicia tells Paul to leave town for good, or she will expose Zach's true identity and the fact that he murdered Martha. When Felicia informs Zach that he will be staying with her now, he attacks Felicia with a hockey stick which causes Felicia to fall down a flight of stairs, causing severe injury to her neck.

In season two, Felicia returns to Wisteria Lane to plan a final act of revenge against Paul, by spilling her own blood all over Paul's kitchen, cutting off two fingers, and faking her own death. Paul is arrested for the supposed murder of Felicia, while Felicia goes hiding and under the alias of her dead sister.

Felicia returns in the seventh season premiere episode. It emerges that Felicia has been pulled over for speeding and was arrested for having no identification, prompting Paul to be freed. Felicia is sent to prison for eighteen months. In episode "A Humiliating Business", it is revealed that Paul's new wife Beth Young is actually Felicia's daughter, using her in order to gain proof that Paul murdered Martha. When Beth fails, Felicia berates her and dismisses her as useless.

Felicia is allowed a compassionate release after Beth kills herself. She returns to Wisteria Lane, still determined to get back at Paul. Felicia begins to poison Paul's food by sabotaging meals that Susan has been cooking for him, but the police suspect that Felicia was the culprit. After Paul is convinced of Susan's innocence, he decides to move out of the lane. However, as he is about to leave, he is knocked unconscious by Felicia, only to awaken bound to a chair and hooked to an antifreeze drip which slowly weakens and poisons him. Susan comes by the house in time to save Paul, but in turn gets attacked by Felicia herself. Paul breaks free and attacks Felicia, beginning to strangle her. However, Susan manages to convince Paul that he is not a killer, and Paul finally lets Felicia go. Felicia then escapes the house with her daughter's ashes avoiding capture from the police. While driving down the highway the next morning, Beth's ashes spill, and Felicia is killed after her car drives head-on with a semi-truck.

==== Mona Clarke ====
Mona Clarke (Maria Cominis) is a wife and mother that lived on Wisteria Lane. She is a registered nurse who works at Fairview Hospital. Mona has a reputation for having a big mouth. On different occasions she has been shown to annoy Lynette, Gabrielle, and Edie. Susan and Mike do not invite her to their wedding, unlike most of the other residents of Wisteria Lane. In season six, while caring for Danny Bolen after his attempted suicide, he awakes and reveals to her that his real name is actually Tyler and tells her the truth behind the Bolens' mystery. Mona blackmails the Bolens', asking for $67,000 so she can start a new life at a new job. Shortly after a heated confrontation with Angie at a Christmas block party, Mona is struck by the wing of a crashing airplane. In the following episode it is revealed that Mona has fallen into a coma, but she finally succumbs to her injuries and dies. Mona returns in the series finale as one of the ghosts watching Susan leave the lane.

==== Sophie Bremmer ====
Sophie Flickman (Lesley Ann Warren; née Bremmer) is Susan's neurotic mother. She is obsessed with youth, and she often tells others that she and Susan are sisters. She is characterized as "a drama queen who tends to exaggerate." Sophie became pregnant with Susan as a teenager and raised her alone. Throughout her childhood, Sophie told Susan that her father was a United States Merchant Marine who died in the Battle of Hanoi during the Vietnam War. Prior to the beginning of the series, Sophie has been married four times to three men.

She first appears in episode "Children Will Listen". She decides to stay with Susan indefinitely after alleging that her boyfriend, Morty Flickman (Bob Newhart), became violent during an argument. Her visit becomes an imposition for Susan, as Sophie continually flirts with strange men and tries to set up double dates for her and Susan. Eventually, Sophie and Morty reconcile and become engaged. Their wedding takes place, when Sophie admits to Susan that her father did not die in the Vietnam War and is actually local businessman Addison Prudy (Paul Dooley), with whom Sophie had an affair while working as his secretary. Sophie reappears in the seventh season episode "Where Do I Belong?", while Susan is in the hospital awaiting a kidney transplant. Susan feels betrayed when Sophie does not volunteer to be her kidney donor; however, Susan soon discovers that Sophie has breast cancer and does not want Susan to know because she is trying to make up for years of being self-centered.

Warren was cast in the role because of her similarities to Hatcher, who commented, "It's almost scary how much we are the same person." Series creator Marc Cherry, who had become a fan of Warren following her performances in Cinderella and Victor Victoria, deemed her "the Teri Hatcher of the 1970s". James Denton recalled that "Lesley Ann looked at some episodes, came in and basically is Susan." Warren was initially turned off by the thought of portraying the mother to Hatcher's character, as there is only an 18-year age difference between the actors; however, she was comforted when Cherry assured her that Sophie "would be portrayed as girlish and flirtatious." Entertainment Weekly's Ann Hodgman criticized Warren's four-episode storyline in the first season, opining: "Every time she's on screen... the show devolves into generic sitcom and becomes an old Bewitched episode where Endora drops in uninvited." Hodgman stated that guest actors "breach the security" of the "claustrophobic, sealed-in quality" of the series. Stransky praised the return of Warren as Sophie in the seventh season and called her final scene in the episode "touching."

==== Reverend Sykes ====
Reverend Sykes (Dakin Matthews) is reverend at the local Presbyterian church. He first appeared in the episode "Live Alone and Like It", when he met with Andrew about his sexual orientation. Sykes presided over Rex's funeral and was the celebrant at Bree and Orson's marriage. He is later seen in numerous occasions for the rest of the series, giving Bree advice whenever she needs some.

=== Introduced in season two ===
==== Phyllis Van de Kamp ====
Phyllis Van de Kamp (Shirley Knight) is Rex's mother. She has always had a very cold relationship with Bree, disapproving of her marriage to Rex and accusing her of making her son's life miserable. After Rex's death, she continues to disrupt Bree's life.

Phyllis first appears in the second season when she arrives for Rex's funeral. She clashes with Bree on the stories the minister would tell about Rex, or the tie he was going to wear. Soon after, Phyllis calls a detective who is looking into Rex's death and informs them that Bree has a boyfriend after seeing Bree being hugged by George Williams. Suspecting foul play, the detectives exhume Rex to examine his body. When Bree learns what Phyllis has done, she packs her bags and sends her home.

Phyllis appears in the episode "If There's Anything I Can't Stand" at Bree's baby shower and discovers that Danielle is actually pregnant and Bree intends to raise the baby as her own. Phyllis later leaves but goes to the convent that Danielle is staying at to take her home with her. Upon discovering this, Bree outbids Phyllis and offers Danielle a convertible and the college of her choice if she stays with them instead. Therefore, Danielle goes home with Bree and Orson. Bree feels sorry for Phyllis and tells her that she will be allowed to babysit the child on weekends.

==== Parcher & Murphy ====
"Parcher & Murphy" is an ad agency in which Lynette works during seasons two and three. Nina Fletcher (Joely Fisher) is Lynette's first boss at "Parcher & Murphy". Nina makes it clear to Lynette on her interview that she despises mothers who put their children above everything else. When Lynette brings Penny multitasks by changing a diaper and delivering a business plan at the same time, Nina's boss Ed Ferrara (Currie Graham) is very impressed and welcomes her aboard, but Nina is less welcoming. One night, Nina is caught in an affair with receptionist Stu Durber (Charlie Babcock) by Lynette, who offers to keep silent about it if Nina would be a little nicer on the job. Unfortunately, Nina fires Stu, and Lynette talks to him and ends up uttering something about a lawsuit. Next time she walks in, the place is in chaos, as it is found out Stu threatened a lawsuit against the firm and they paid him off to settle, Ed to fire the majority of staff, including Nina, and promotes Lynette to her position. Nina then explains to Lynette that being nice was one of many luxuries she gave up to keep the firm afloat, and told her that if she thought she was not seeing her kids enough before, then she will see them even less now.

Later, Ed hires Tom on "There's Something About a War". In the following episode, "Silly People", he and Tom place bets that Tom could do certain tricks. Lynette tries to stop all of these games, so Ed tells her if she could eat a package of raw bacon, they will stop. Lynette succeeds and Ed and Tom have had a business-like relationship since. But after having marital problems with his wife Fran (Penelope Ann Miller), he asks Lynette to send instant messages to her to help him with his sex life. When Fran figures out it was not Ed, she tells him to fire the person who wrote the IMs or she will leave him; he fires Tom instead. In season three, Ed threatens to fire Lynette after she fakes being ill to help Tom with his pizza business at a fair. Lynette eventually quits the job to work at the pizzeria.

In the episode "Back in Business", Stu now works for Bree for the marketing of her cookbook.

==== Xiao-Mei ====
Xiao-Mei (Gwendoline Yeo) is an illegal immigrant from China, sold by her uncle to Maxine Bennett (Jane Lynch) as a servant. After being liberated by the authorities, Father Crowley takes her to the Solis's. Discovering Xiao-Mei could not be deported if she was the mother of an American citizen, Gabrielle suggests Xiao-Mei be their surrogate. However, Xiao-Mei doesn't understand the process Gabrielle and Carlos are proposing and initially refuses, thinking that she will be worthless if she does not preserve her virginity until marriage. Gabrielle convinces her that experience is what men want, and Xiao-Mei agrees to have the baby. One day, Xiao-Mei catches Carlos in the master bath before the appointment at the fertility clinic, and undresses, preparing for sex. Gabrielle is unhappy that Xiao-Mei has misunderstood and Carlos does not correct her misconception. Later on, Gabrielle suspects Xiao-Mei is sleeping with Carlos and takes her to the hospital, and it is revealed she is no longer a virgin. Gabrielle puts baby monitors in the house to check on Xiao-Mei and Carlos, eventually discovering that they were indeed having sex. Horrified, Gabrielle kicks Carlos out and asks for a divorce but tells Xiao-Mei to stay, causing tension between them to the point that she runs away once. Her water breaks at Bree's wedding, and she looks quite guilty after giving birth to a black baby boy because Solis's' embryo had been accidentally switched during the implant. The baby was transferred to his original family. Eventually Xiao-Mei moves to Chinatown to work for her friend in her restaurant.

==== Nora Huntington ====
Nora Huntington (Kiersten Warren) was dancing on a cruise where she met Tom. The two ended up having a one-night stand and Nora became pregnant. When Tom finds out that he has a daughter named Kayla, he meets Nora in Atlantic City. Lynette thinks the two of them are having an affair until Tom explains the truth. Nora asked for back child support which Tom owes. Lynette finally agrees to give her the money, as long as Nora stays away from their family. But Nora wants the two families together and spends the money on an apartment close to Wisteria Lane.

When Tom wants to open a pizzeria, Lynette doesn't appreciate the idea, but Nora is supportive. Behind Lynette's back Nora meets Tom at a restaurant, and they have dinner together. Nora makes a move on Tom, but he swears he does not want anything more and tells her he loves his wife. Nora is very upset and leaves. After Tom tells Lynette what happened, Lynette breaks into Nora's house and threatens that if Nora ever comes near Tom again, she will hurt her. Nora decides to move to Mexico with Kayla, to work as a stripper in a dance club. Lynette tries to sue for custody of Kayla. Shopping at Field's Supermarket, she and Nora run into each other and Nora confronts her about the custody case. Meanwhile, Carolyn Bigsby creates a hostage situation, which results in Carolyn shooting Nora in the chest. Before Nora dies, Lynette promises her that she will love Kayla like she was her own daughter, and Nora dies.

Nora appeared among other deceased characters in the series finale.

=== Introduced in season three ===
==== Alma Hodge ====
Alma Hodge (Valerie Mahaffey) was Orson's first wife. Alma tricked him into marrying her by getting pregnant, thinking that having a baby together would make Orson fall in love with her. Unfortunately, she has a miscarriage. When Alma finds out that Orson had an affair with Monique Polier (Kathleen York), she leaves Orson and disappears to make people think Orson murdered her.

Alma suddenly arrives to Wisteria Lane, and Bree tries to have a good relationship with her. However, Alma buys herself the old Applewhite house, so Bree wants Orson to get rid of her. Orson tries to convince Alma to leave, but she blackmails him, threatening to reveal that it was he who ran over Mike Delfino in his car and buried Monique. Bree then proceeds to visit her to tell her to move away, but she discovers a picture of Orson and Monique and a bag containing Monique's teeth hidden under the linoleum, where they were planted by Alma. Bree gives Orson the teeth, who plants them back in Alma's house, stating that she will not find them and that she will now leave them alone, or else he will call the police and tell them that Alma murdered Monique and kept her teeth. Later, Orson's mother Gloria and Alma trick Orson into believing Alma was going to commit suicide. When Orson arrives to Alma's house, he is drugged by Gloria so that Alma could forcibly have sex with him. The morning after, Bree tells Orson that Alma raped him, and he finally tells her the truth about what happened with Monique. Orson then goes to Alma's to tell her that he does not need to worry about her anymore. She tells him she may be pregnant, to which he responds that he does not care. Alma then realizes that there is nothing else she can do to make Orson love her. Gloria, however, does not give up and locks Alma in the attic and plans to kill Bree. After Alma tries to escape from her attic through the window, she falls from the roof to her death. Orson discovers her dead body and plants the suicide note and the bag containing Monique's teeth in her house, making it seem to the police that she killed Monique and committed suicide.

Alma appeared amongst other deceased characters in the series finale.

==== Carolyn Bigsby ====
Carolyn Bigsby (Laurie Metcalf) is Orson's former neighbor. Before his move to Wisteria Lane, Carolyn had found Orson thoroughly cleaning his house, and upon learning his wife, Alma, was missing, began to suspect him of Alma's murder. By the time Orson moves to Wisteria Lane, Carolyn's suspicion has become an obsession, and she tries in vain to warn Bree several times. Bree reaches her limit with Carolyn and retaliates by revealing the affair between Monique Polier and Carolyn's husband Harvey Bigsby (Brian Kerwin). This results in Carolyn going to Harvey's supermarket with a gun, intending to kill him. Harvey locks himself in the manager's office with Edie, and Carolyn panics and creates a hostage situation, in which Carolyn kills Nora Huntington. While Carolyn is having a discussion with Lynette, a hostage manages to retrieve a large food can from the floor behind him and throws it at Carolyn's head, and she pulls the trigger before falling to the floor and dropping the gun. Carolyn attempts to retrieve the gun, but Austin struggles with her long enough for another hostage to pick up the gun and shoot Carolyn in the head, killing her instantly.

==== Ian Hainsworth ====
Ian Hainsworth (Dougray Scott) is Susan's British boyfriend and later fiancé whose wife, Jane Hainsworth (Cecily Gambrell), is in a coma following a horseback riding accident. He meets Susan in the hospital after Mike falls into a coma following a hit-and-run accident. He pursues Susan, despite her hesitation to abandon her relationship with Mike. When Mike awakens from his coma with a case of retrograde amnesia, he rejects Susan's attempts to rekindle their romance; as a result, she begins dating Ian once more. When Mike is arrested for the murder of Monique Polier, Susan insists that he is innocent. Frustrated with Susan's unwavering commitment to her ex-boyfriend, Ian offers to pay for Mike's attorney as long as Susan does not speak to him again. Following Jane's passing, Ian and Susan become engaged. Once Mike is acquitted for the murder charges, he begins to regain the memory of his relationship with Susan. He challenges Ian for Susan's affections in a game of poker, which Ian wins. When Susan learns of this betrayal, she banishes both men from her life. Eventually, she chooses to forgive Ian and they renew their engagement; however, when Ian realizes Susan will never truly stop loving Mike, he breaks up with her and moves back to the United Kingdom.

Casting for the role of Ian, a role originally intended to last only six to eight episodes, took place in June 2006. With the Ian storyline, the writers intended "to get [Susan] into a bona fide romantic-comedy kind of relationship that threatens her preexisting relationship with Mike." Scott described the character as "bumbling at time... He kind of blossoms after he rediscovers his romantic juices with Susan."

==== Gloria Hodge ====
Gloria Hodge (Dixie Carter) is Orson's scheming sociopathic mother. When Orson was a teenager, Gloria killed her unfaithful husband and staged his death as a suicide. Orson blamed himself for his 'suicide' because he was supposed to be watching over his depressed father but opted instead to sneak out. Gloria would exploit her son's guilt to make him do the things she wanted him to do. Gloria made Orson feel so guilty that he became extremely depressed and had to be committed to a mental institution.

When Gloria discovered Orson was cheating on Alma, she decided to go to his mistress Monique's house. Gloria ended up killing Monique "in self-defense" when she told her to stay away from Orson, and Monique attacked her. Orson discovered Gloria standing over Monique's body and Gloria guilted Orson, with his father's suicide, to help her hide Monique's body. Orson obliged and after the deed was done, he sent Gloria to live in a nursing home.

Gloria reappeared after Orson and Bree's wedding. She tried to convince Bree to leave Orson by telling her he was a bad person and revealing his affair with the deceased Monique, and then teams up with Alma to separate Orson and Bree. Gloria subsequently gives Orson sleeping pills combined with Viagra so that he can be raped by Alma, who thinks having a baby with Orson will get them back together. However, when Orson tells Alma he does not care if Alma is pregnant, Alma accepts defeat and threatens to call the police and implicate everyone. Gloria locks her in an upstairs closet and then attempts to kill Bree. Orson, after finding out his mother's plan, races home from the hospital. He finds Gloria trying to slit Bree's wrists in the bathroom (a scene strikingly similar to the one he found his father in). At this point, he realizes Gloria had killed his father. He stops Gloria from hurting Bree, but in doing so, causes her to have a stroke, but instead of calling her an ambulance, he takes Gloria to Alma's house. As Orson does so, he finds Alma herself, killed by a fall from the roof. He leaves Gloria with Alma in the lawn and returns home. By the time Ida Greenberg finds Alma and Gloria, Gloria's stroke has caused total paralysis, unable to speak or move (though her brain remains active).

==== Victor Lang ====
Victor Lang (John Slattery) is Gabrielle's second husband. He tells his chauffeur to intentionally rear-end Gabrielle's car so he can meet her. He tells Gabrielle he wants to make it up to her by taking her to dinner. Victor and Gabrielle begin to be intimate, though with many problems. After spending a night together at Victor's house, Victor asks Gabrielle to marry him. She does not give him a straight answer but after a violent press conference emerges from compromising photos of Victor and Gabrielle in an elevator, Gabrielle comes to Victor's rescue and accepts his proposal. When Gabrielle discusses wedding plans with Victor, she is shocked to learn the press will be at their wedding and that most of Victor's efforts are all about his image. Gabrielle becomes worried that marrying Victor will be a mistake. In the third-season finale, Victor and Gabrielle get married. Shortly after they wed, Gabrielle overhears a conversation between Victor and his father, Milton Lang (Mike Farrell), in which Victor reveals to his father that he only married Gabrielle so that he could win the Latino vote and that he plans to run for governor.

In the fourth season, Gabrielle tells Victor that she is not happy and must know where she stands with him, and she suggests they go away for a week together, but he refuses due to his tight schedule. Upon learning about Gabrielle's affair with John Rowland, Victor tells Carlos that if Gabrielle ever did that to him then he would "take care" of the man; unknown to him that Carlos is having an affair with Gabrielle. In "Now I Know, Don't Be Scared" Gabrielle tells Victor she is leaving him, but after Milton bribes her to stay married to Victor until an election is over as a divorce will hurt his political image, she agrees. But when she is picked up in a limo, she finds Victor inside and she tells him to his face but he says he loves her and rips out all his schedule for the next month so he can spend it with her. After Gabrielle heads off to do Yoga the next day, an angry Edie drops by and shows Victor the photos of Gabrielle and Carlos kissing. In "You Can't Judge a Book By Its Cover", Victor takes Gabrielle out for a boat ride and tells her that he knows everything. Gabrielle knocks Victor off the boat twice (first by herself and then with Carlos' help), fearing for her safety. Victor is taken to the hospital, and humiliates Gabrielle by saying, "I remember everything. I think I will rest now. I'm gonna need all my strength."

During a tornado, Victor finds Carlos in his house. Carlos tells Victor that he and Gabrielle never meant to hurt him, and Victor answers by shooting at him. Carlos escapes and Victor tracks him down. Victor and Carlos fight it out. During the fight, just as Victor is about to kill Carlos with a lead pipe, a flying fencepost impales Victor in the chest, killing him instantly. At Victor's funeral, Milton tells Gabrielle that he knows about the affair and that she will not get a dime from Victor and kicks her out of the funeral.

==== Travers McLain ====
Travers McLain (Jake Cherry, season 3; Stephen Lunsford, season 5) is Edie's son with her first husband Charles McLain. He lives with his father full-time. Though briefly mentioned in the pilot, he first appears in the third season, when Charles leaves him with Edie while he goes on a Doctors without Borders trip. Edie tries to leave Travers with Carlos while she goes to a party, but he declines. Seeing Travers playing by himself in the street, Carlos brings him to his home and later criticizes an intoxicated Edie for not supervising her son. She in turn reveals that she did not take custody of him because she did not feel she was capable of it. Later on, Edie uses him as a way to get closer to Carlos. When Charles comes to pick up Travers, Edie tries to get shared custody of Travers when she suspects Carlos might be losing interest in their relationship. Charles and Edie get into an argument, and she threatens to hire a lawyer so she can get full custody of Travers. Carlos learns of Edie's plan and tells her that she should think of what is best for Travers which is for him to stay with Charles and not have to go back and forth.

Travers is next seen in season 5 when the Housewives visit him at Beecher's Academy to inform him of his mother's death and to give him her ashes. While he is sad about his mother's death, he harbors anger toward her for her abandonment. He eventually forgives her after a conversation with Karen McCluskey and asks the Housewives to dispose of Edie's ashes as they see fit.

==== Rick Coletti ====
Rick Coletti (Jason Gedrick) is hired by Lynette at Scavo Pizzeria. He used to be a chef at a four star restaurant. Because of Rick's former cocaine addiction, Tom does not agree with Lynette's decision to hire him. As Lynette's marriage starts to shake, she and Rick get closer. After Lynette and Rick are locked in a freezer as a result of the pizzeria being robbed, the two cuddle close together for warmth and go to sleep. Tom confronts Rick after seeing a surveillance tape, in which Lynette and Rick were having dinner before the pizzeria was robbed. Tom makes a speech about how although his marriage to Lynette is shaky, it is rock solid, and Rick could never break it up. Tom asks Rick to quit, but Rick says he will not leave unless Lynette fires him, because "she doesn't want him gone". Later, Rick tells Lynette he has feelings for her, and that it is obvious she has feelings for him. This enrages Lynette and she fires him. While she pretends this didn't affect her, she is later seen sobbing in her bathroom, distraught over the loss of Rick. He returns in season four, informing Lynette and Tom that he is opening a restaurant around the corner from Scavo's. It is shown that Rick still has feelings for Lynette. The restaurant steals customers from the Pizzeria until it is burned down by Porter and Preston.

==== Stella Wingfield ====
Stella Kaminsky (née Lindquist, formerly Wingfield; Polly Bergen) is Lynette's mother. She used to be an abusive mother, who frequently beat her girls. She used to get drunk and abuse drugs very often, and also bring strange men over to their house. She was almost always absent, so Lynette had to take care of her little sisters and make them go to school. Stella had breast cancer when she was younger.

Stella first appeared on the show in the season three finale, after learning that Lynette had Hodgkin's lymphoma. She comes to Wisteria Lane to help Lynette with the children while she is receiving treatment, much to Lynette's chargrin.

When Lynette is cured from cancer, she and her sisters do not want her to live with them, so she leaves. After discovering she is sleeping in her car, she talks to her former stepfather, Glen Wingfield (Richard Chamberlain). He reveals that the divorce happened because he is gay, and agrees to let Stella stay with him, as he misses having her around.

In the fifth season it is revealed that Lynette has taken Stella to a retirement home after Glen's death. After an argument, Lynette tells Stella her reasons for putting her in the home and why visiting her is not a pleasant experience. Stella reveals her fear of dying and says she stays angry because it is all she has left. Lynette agrees that if Stella changes, she will visit at least twice a week and sometimes bring the children along with her.

Until season 7, Stella was married twice, but neither marriage had worked out. She marries Frank Kaminsky (Larry Hagman) for his money, no longer looking for love. When he dies a couple of days later, Stella legally becomes a rich widow.

=== Introduced in season four ===
==== Adam Mayfair ====
Adam Mayfair (Nathan Fillion) is a gynecologist and Katherine's second husband. Katherine is very jealous of any attention other women pay to her husband, and it is often implied that he has a history as a womanizer. It eventually comes to light that the couple had left Chicago because of a lawsuit initiated by a patient named Sylvia Greene (Melora Walters) against Adam. The case had been settled out of court, with Adam allowing his wife to believe the patient was a nymphomaniac. When Sylvia arrives in Fairview hoping to rekindle a relationship with Adam, Katherine is furious and asks him to leave. While packing, he finds the letter that Katherine's Aunt Lillian had left for Dylan, which explains Katherine's secret, and he decides he wants to leave her. After the separation, Dylan asks to meet with Adam to learn the truth about her father. Katherine first meets with Adam, who agrees to talk to Dylan in the interest of learning what she already knows but promises he will not reveal Katherine's secrets. Katherine tells him she wants to work on their marriage, but Adam says he is finished. In the fourth season finale, Adam tells Katherine that, though he is still finished with her, he is not finished with Dylan and wants to protect her from Wayne. He and Katherine attend Dylan's cello recital, with Adam planning to take Dylan and Katherine away afterward on a vacation. Wayne also attends the recital, unbeknownst to Adam, who had neither met nor seen a photo of Wayne. During the intermission, Wayne elicits Adam's help with a flat tire. Wayne knocks Adam unconscious with a tire iron, drives him to an abandoned shack, and beats him until he believes Adam is dead. Adam, who had only feigned death, steals a car and rushes to save Katherine. He arrives as Wayne is preparing to shoot Katherine and struggles with him, taking his gun. Later, Bree takes Adam to nurse his wounds and he comforts Katherine after she shoots Wayne to death. This is Adam's last appearance.

==== Benjamin Van de Kamp ====
Benjamin Tyson Van de Kamp (formerly Katz & Hodge; Jake Soldera) is Danielle's and Austin McCann's son and Bree's grandson. However, Bree fakes a pregnancy to make seem like he is her son by Orson. Danielle gives birth to Benjamin on Halloween when Dr. Adam Mayfair delivers him in Bree's kitchen, and Bree raises him as her son to save her family from scandal. Danielle reclaims her son when he is three years old. He is later adopted by her then husband Leo Katz. However, Leo leaves Danielle and Benjamin, resulting in Benjamin changing his name from Benjamin Katz to Benjamin Van de Kamp.

==== Wayne Davis ====
Wayne Davis (Gary Cole) is a police officer, Katherine's first husband, and the father of the "real" Dylan. It is shown in flashbacks that he beat his wife and also had a drinking problem, causing Katherine to leave him. He spent twelve years trying to track Katherine and his daughter down and discovered Katherine is back on Wisteria Lane. He wanted a relationship with who he thought to be his daughter, until Katherine informed him that Dylan is not his child. Upon hearing this, he has a DNA test done at the forensics lab. The test results come back concluding that he is not Dylan's father. He tries everything in his power to find out what actually happened to his daughter, even threatening to kill Katherine so she would tell him. He then held Katherine hostage along with Bree, until Katherine finally told him what really happened with Dylan (see Dylan's section). When Wayne finds this out from Katherine, he attempts to kill her, until Adam comes and a fight between the two ensues, resulting in Adam overpowering Wayne. While lying on the floor, Wayne threatens Katherine, telling her he may go to jail, but his friends at the police will help him get out and that he will come after her again. After realizing the truth in his statements, Katherine shoots him in the chest, killing him instantly.

==== Celia Solis ====
Celia Solis (Daniella Baltodano, Karolinah Villarreal as the 11-year-old Celia Solis in the episode "If..." and Gloria Garayua 25 to 30 years later in the same episode) is the youngest daughter of Gabrielle and Carlos Solis. Like her sister Juanita, Celia was born during the five-year-jump. Though she is often quiet and is not as rebellious as Juanita, she nevertheless gives Gabrielle a hard time in most of her appearances.

In "Boom Crunch", Celia is attending the Christmas block party on Wisteria Lane, and is nearly struck by a crashing plane, when Lynette pulls her out of the way, so she is taken to the hospital. In the episode "If...", Gabrielle is convinced that God saved Celia because she is special. Gabrielle imagines a series of hypothetical scenarios which involve an older Celia at different ages being forced by Gabrielle to become a television star. Back in the hospital room, Carlos asks Gabrielle what their daughter needs to do to be special. Gabrielle replies "Nothing" and smiles at Celia, lying in her hospital bed.

=== Introduced in season five ===
==== Jackson Braddock ====
Jackson Braddock (Gale Harold) is Susan's boyfriend throughout the fifth season. He is briefly introduced at the end of the fourth season finale, which flashforwards five years into the future. The couple continues dating in the fifth season. Meeting while Jackson was painting her home, they keep their relationship secret until Mike and M.J. soon learn of the relationship and are both supportive. Jackson sustains serious injuries in a nightclub fire. After recovering, Jackson decides to move to Riverton and pursue a career opportunity at a college in Riverton and invites Susan to come with him, but she declines. Jackson returns later in the season and asks Susan to marry him, as his visa has expired and he must marry an American citizen to avoid being deported to Canada. Dave fears that Jackson could inform police of his involvement in the club fire and reports him to immigration officials. Jackson is subsequently deported.

On October 14, 2008, Harold entered intensive care after a motorcycle accident. He sustained several injuries, including brain swelling and a fractured shoulder. While Desperate Housewives were required to rewrite one scene in the episode "City on Fire", Gale's absence did not delay production. Originally, the writers had planned to end the character's storyline around midseason, but Harold's accident forced them to push the storyline's resolution to the end of the season. Following the accident, Harold recorded dialogue for an offscreen speaking part in the January 2009 episode "Home is the Place". In April 2009, Harold returned to the series six months following the accident to continue his character's storyline. While reviewing the fifth season, TV Guide's Matt Roush commented the introduction of Harold, as well as other new cast members, "make Wisteria Lane once again an irresistible place to revisit."

==== Alex Cominis ====
Dr. Alex Cominis (Todd Grinnell) is Andrew's ex-husband. He is a plastic surgeon and resides with Andrew on Wisteria Lane, in a house which Bree purchased for them. He is quick to point out Bree's selfishness, which Bree has come to appreciate. Alex appeared in the gay porn film "Rear Deployment" while putting himself through medical school. Alex is not seen in season six, but it is revealed that Andrew cheated on him. Alex leaves Andrew in season seven, due to Andrew's severe drinking problem.

==== Principal Hobson ====
Principal Hobson (John Rubinstein) is the head of a prestigious private elementary school called Oakridge. Susan takes a job at the school in order to enroll M.J. and pay his tuition. Later, he makes sporadic appearances. In the seventh season, he fires Susan after discovering that she had appeared on a pornographic website. Susan fails to convince Principal Hobson to rehire her some episodes later. His final appearance is in the final season, when he tells Gabrielle that Juanita is sexually harassing a boy named Ryan.

=== Introduced in season six ===
==== Paige and Patrick Scavo ====
Paige Scavo (Emmett, Hudson and Noah Martin Greenberg in season 6+7, Samantha and Isabel Kahle in season 8, Mindy Montavon as Older Paige in 6x11) is the youngest child of Tom and Lynette. Lynette thinks her cancer has returned in "If It's Only In Your Head" and goes to the doctor to find that it is not cancer, but that she is pregnant with a second set of twins. In the season 6 episode "If...", Lynette has complications with her pregnancy and one of her babies needs surgery to prevent mental and physical damage. The surgery does not go as expected, and the baby Lynette was going to name Patrick (Zayne Emory as a teenager and Anthony Traina as an adult in hypothetical flashforwards) does not survive. Lynette is still pregnant with Paige. In the 6th-season finale entitled "I Guess This Is Goodbye" Lynette goes into labor with her daughter while she's held hostage by Eddie Orlofsky.

==== Roy Bender ====
Roy Bender (Orson Bean) is a retired steak salesman, who begins dating Karen at the start of the sixth season. Together they discover Julie after she is strangled. He and Karen later confess that they are in love with each other. Lynette later hires Roy as a handyman, at Karen's request. It is where Roy is revealed to be a little old fashioned when it comes to women and does not like that Lynette bosses Tom around and goes behind her back to get his approval on things. He and the Scavo's later come to an understanding. He is also hired by Bree to watch Orson when she fears he will commit suicide. However instead of watching Orson, Roy leaves him in the laundry room, puts a broom through Orson's wheelchair spokes and goes to sleep. By the seventh season, he and Karen have married. In the final season, it is revealed that the name of his first wife is Miriam, who died two weeks before their 40th anniversary from brain cancer. Roy plays a vital role in the two hours season finale, by advising Tom on telling Lynette how much he loves her, and later by contacting Trip Weston to ask her to get some music for Karen, which impresses Bree. He is by Karen's side when she dies.

==== Eddie Orlofsky ====
Eddie Orlofsky (Josh Zuckerman) is the infamous "Fairview Strangler". He is a friend of Danny's, one of the few that remained friends with him even when Danny was being accused of assaulting Julie, who was attacked by Eddie himself. Eddie is shown working at a local café where Emily Portsmith, a waitress, becomes his second known victim. Eddie mentions that he was glad he was late to work, because he does not think he could have handled discovering Emily's body. Eddie invites Julie and Danny to watch him do stand-up comedy at a local club, but he performs terribly. Eddie picks up Irina after she is dumped by Preston Scavo on their wedding night. After she insults him, Eddie strangles her and buries her in the woods.

The episode "Epiphany" reveals details of Eddie's past. Eddie had such a desperately lonely childhood, because his father abandoned him and his mother Barbara (Diane Farr), and Barbara claimed she never loved or wanted him either. Also, Eddie was always rejected by the women he was attracted to, so he developed strong hatred towards the women who rejected him. On the other hand, since he was a child, Eddie has had a friendly relationship with the women on Wisteria Lane: Mary Alice befriended Barbara after Eddie's father left his family; Gabrielle let him unpack boxes in her house when she first moved in; Bree gave him some love advice, unaware his affections would be towards her daughter Danielle; Lynette tried to include him in the Scavo family's game night to help him fit in; and Susan paid for him to attend an artist's seminar to encourage his artistic ability. Eddie develops a crush on Susan but she rejects him, so he plans to strangle Susan but mistakenly strangles Julie.

When Barbara discovers that Eddie is the Strangler, she tries to call the police. In a rage, Eddie strangles Barbara to death, and minutes later, Lynette invites him to move into her house. Lynette realizes he is the Fairview strangler when she tells him about his mother's body being found in the woods, and he locks Lynette in his childhood home. In the season finale, Eddie holds Lynette hostage when she begins to go into labor. In the end, after helping her deliver the baby, he has Lynette call the police and he turns himself in, thanks in part to Lynette stepping in and saying she believes in him.

==== Mitzi Kinsky ====
Mitzi Kinsky (Mindy Sterling) is a resident on Wisteria Lane living at 4347, the house formerly owned by Ida Greenberg, who moved in sometime during the five years between the fourth and fifth seasons. She has a reputation of being a bitter, cynical and shrewd middle-aged widow. Everyone who lives on Wisteria Lane knows who Mitzi is and they often stay away from her due to her bad temper and selfish attitude. Mitzi is first seen in "The Glamorous Life", throwing away trash and having two disputes with Angie over trash disposal and recyclables. When the environmental Angie argues with Mitzi that she throws away recyclable material, Mitzi responds with indifference about the environment or the world in general. Mitzi also tells Angie that she doesn't care about humanity because she has a dead husband, a son who's "shooting blanks", and an estranged daughter who "likes the ladies". Mitzi is later seen in the season six finale "I Guess This is Goodbye", this time arguing with both Susan and Karen. She reappeared in season seven's "Pleasant Little Kingdom" where Paul Young considers buying her house. Mitzi considers selling but decides she will not screw over her neighbors, so she stays on Wisteria Lane. During the riot, she tells some protestors that Bob and Lee sold their house to Paul, prompting the protestors to attack them. Weeks later, Bree asks if Mitzi would be a possible kidney donor for Susan, but Mitzi slams the door in her face. Later on, Mitzi finally gives in and gets herself tested, but she is not a match for Susan. In season 8, Mitzi is never seen, but she gives Susan and M.J. a basket full of homemade jams and a condolence card after Mike dies.

==== Robin Gallagher ====
Robin Gallagher (Julie Benz) is a stripper at Double D's, a strip club left to Susan when her ex-husband, Karl Mayer, is killed in the plane crash. When Susan sells her half of the business, she convinces Robin to leave stripping when she learns that Robin has higher hopes and dreams. Susan manages to get Robin a job at her school, but she is fired after it is revealed she used to be a stripper. Susan and Mike then invite Robin to stay with them. Robin accepts the offer, but the other women of Wisteria Lane are less than pleased to have their husbands, boyfriends and sons leering at Robin.

Robin decides to become roommates with Katherine, and the two become fast friends. After a night out together, Robin admits to being a lesbian and kisses Katherine. This confuses Katherine, but she ends up sleeping with her. Robin becomes frustrated as Katherine is unwilling to define their relationship or show affection in front of the neighbors. Robin is afraid that Katherine is kicking her out, but instead Katherine suggests they go away together, so they pack and leave that evening for Paris. It is revealed in the series finale that Robin and Katherine broke up three months after arriving in Paris.

==== Sam Allen ====
Sam Allen/Sam Van de Kamp (Samuel Page) is a young man who comes to work for Bree in the second half of season 6. He quickly wins Bree over with his business know-how, but he receives heavy criticism from Andrew, who believes he is hiding something. Later when Bree goes to drop off a basket of muffins after Sam and Andrew get into a violent fight, she discovers Sam is Rex's son. Bree is shocked by the revelation but later decides to speak with him. He reveals Rex and his mother had a one-night stand before he met Bree and they produced him. Rex visited him a few times but after a while Sam's mother asked him to stop, citing it hurt Sam too much. Sam tells Bree he always wondered why Rex chose his new family over him. This makes Bree feel guilty. Bree decides to incorporate Sam into the family and organizes a family dinner (including Danielle) so everyone can get to know each other. Sam becomes a rival to Andrew in the company, as well as for Bree's affection. He tries to discredit Andrew and prove him unreliable. Sam plots to make Bree fire Andrew, which she later does, but after she reveals to him since she has a love-and-hate relationship with her son, and it's most likely Andrew would return. After, an important client dinner is sabotaged, Sam points a finger at Andrew. When Bree tells Orson what occurred, he says it couldn't be Andrew because it seems something well planned. Bree begins to suspect Sam's true intentions. Bree's suspicions also arise when Sam acted weird around a woman who was working at the grocery store they were shopping at. Wanting to know the truth, Bree visits the lady and finds out it's Sam mother. Bree is shocked because Sam had previously told her his mother had recently died. When Bree confronts Sam, Sam reveals that a few months before he started working for Bree he discovered a letter from Rex offering assistance to raise Sam. When Sam asked his mother about the letter, she says she declined his offer and decided to raise Sam on her own. Sam tells Bree he was extremely angry at his mother at robbing him of a chance with his affluent father. When Bree tries to reason with Sam, Sam violently yells at Bree and throws a vase across the room. Bree becomes scared of Sam and decides to tell him to leave. Sam retaliates by telling Bree he will not be going anywhere. Bree attempts to use two detective friends to threaten and scare Sam, but her plans fail. Sam tells her if she doesn't hand over her company to him, then he'll tell the cops Andrew was the one who ran over Carlos Solis's mother. Sam tells her a drunken Danielle had told him about the incident at the dinner party in an attempt to bond with him. At the end of season six, Bree signs over her company to Sam.

==== Patrick Logan ====
Patrick Logan (John Barrowman) is the former leader of an eco-terrorist group and the father of Danny Bolen, whom Angie has been on the run from. He finds Angie and Danny after 20 years of searching. Patrick runs Nick over and then holds Angie and Danny hostage in their own house. He forces Angie to make another bomb by threatening to take Danny's life. However, Angie plants the bomb inside the detonator instead, and Patrick is killed when he triggers it.

=== Introduced in season seven ===
==== Keith Watson ====
Keith Watson (Brian Austin Green) is a contractor who helps Bree redecorate her house. Keith dates both Bree and Renee in different occasions, and the two try to sabotage the other until Renee admits defeat. Bree and Keith begin a steady relationship.

Bree is introduced to Keith's parents, Richard Watson (John Schneider) and Mary Wagner (Nancy Travis). Richard is retired from the army and Mary is Bree's gynecologist for some time. When his parents' divorce, Richard moves in with Keith. Taking pity on him, Bree frequently invites Richard to join them for dinner, much to Keith's annoyance. Richard later tries to kiss Bree, leading Keith attack Richard while the residents of Wisteria Lane are staging a protest against a halfway house. Several protestors mistake Keith for a convict and attack him, ensuing a riot on the lane.

When Keith discovers he has a son who lives in Florida, he asks Bree to move there with him. They then break up on amicable terms when she does not want to move with him.

==== Beth Young ====
Beth Young (née Tilman; Emily Bergl) is Paul Young's second wife introduced in "You Must Meet My Wife". A friendly, but troubled and sensitive woman, Beth met Paul while writing to him in prison where he was serving time for the supposed murder of Felicia Tilman. When she arrives to Wisteria Lane, Paul wants to finally have their "wedding night", but Beth refuses to have sex, preferring to take it slowly. In "Truly Content" the housewives invite Beth to their weekly poker game, during which Beth shares some information about her past and how she met Paul at prison. Later, Beth learns from Karen McCluskey that, while Paul was exonerated from the supposed murder of Felicia, everyone blames him for the murder of Felicia's sister, Martha Huber. Beth and Paul talk about this, and she claims that, even if he is really a murderer, she will remain by his side. However, Beth is worried about Paul's plans for Wisteria Lane. When his former cellmate moves into the neighborhood, Beth threatens to tell people he attacked her unless he tells her Paul's plans. She meets Paul at home in sexy underwear, revealing what she knows but she supports him, saying she knows all about revenge.

It is soon revealed that Beth is actually Felicia's daughter, aiding her mother in revenge on Paul. After she and Paul sleep together, Beth questions her mother's sanity and if she knew for certain Paul killed her sister, so the two women have a fight. When Paul is shot later in the season, Beth returns to jail, convinced her mother had something to do with it but Felicia is honestly surprised to hear it happened. Unknown to Beth, the detectives investigating the shooting told Paul how she was Felicia's daughter, making him realize that she has been using him all along. While Paul develops hatred for Beth, Beth falls in love with Paul and has turned against Felicia. He kicks Beth out of the house, but she tries to get back with Paul, telling him how she believed her mother's claims of Paul killing her aunt but now that she knows him, does not believe it. She is thus shocked when Paul confesses to having killed Martha after all. Beth goes to see Felicia in prison where her mother berates her for being so stupid as to not get the confession on tape and that Beth is useless to her, telling the guards to remove her daughter from the visitor list. Beth then learns she is a match to be a kidney donor for Susan. With nothing else to live for, Beth goes to the hospital and makes sure the nurse in the waiting room files the paperwork ensuring her kidney will go to Susan. Beth then pulls a gun out of her purse and shoots herself in the head, leaving her brain dead.

Beth appeared amongst other deceased characters in the series finale.

==== Grace Sanchez ====
Grace Sanchez (Ceci Balagot) is the biological daughter of Gabrielle and Carlos, revealed to have been switched at birth with Juanita Solis. Upon meeting, Gabrielle is immediately taken with her. She briefly spends time with the Solis family, causing jealousy for Juanita, before leaving to flee from ICE.

==== Jenny Hunter-McDermott ====
Jenny Hunter-McDermott (Isabella Acres) is the 10-year-old girl adopted by Bob Hunter and Lee Dermott. She is introduced at the end of season 7, in "I'm Still Here". She develops a close relationship with Renee, who helps her with "girl things", since she does not have a mother.

=== Introduced in season eight ===
==== Jane Carlson ====
Jane Carlson (Andrea Parker) is first introduced when Lynette suspects Tom has a new girlfriend following their separation, but she suspects Chloe, who is in fact Jane's daughter. At first, Jane and Lynette are friendly to each other, but when Lynette asks Jane to back off from Tom, Jane refuses and hostility between the two women begins. Jane and Tom continue to spend time together, leading Penny to suspect they will eventually get married, worrying Lynette. Jane and Tom organize a romantic trip to Paris, but when Lynette tells Tom about her involvement in the cover of the murder of Alejandro Perez, he decides to stay for a while. Jane leaves to Paris anyway, and Tom joins her later. When they return from Paris, Jane and Tom move together. After Mike's death, Lynette decides to get Tom back, while Tom realizes he still has feelings for Lynette. In "With So Little to Be Sure Of", Jane gives Lynette her and Tom's divorce papers, which Tom has already signed but was not ready to give Lynette. Tom then fights with Jane about ending his marriage when Tom was not ready. In "The People Will Hear", Tom confesses that he is still in love with Lynette. Jane is sad because she actually loved Tom. Jane moves out at the end of the episode, heartbroken.

==== Trip Weston ====
Trip Weston (Scott Bakula) is a criminal lawyer who defends Bree after she is accused of the murder of Alejandro Perez (aka Ramon Sanchez). Bob Hunter, who was initially Bree's lawyer, tells her she needs a criminal lawyer, and suggests Weston for the job, describing him as a "shark." At first, Weston refuses to defend Bree, claiming her case is not challenging enough; however, he later accepts the job. Bree begins to develop a crush for Trip. Besides that, Trip started to defend his client in court, until Karen McCluskey lies to claim to everybody that she killed Gabrielle's stepfather. Bree and Trip got married and move three years after Susan, who was the first to leave the lane, to Louisville, Kentucky.
