= Bob Daily =

American television producer and screenwriter

- Born: Robert Daily
- Education: Carleton College (BA); University of Chicago (MA)
- Occupations: producer; screenwriter
- Years active: 1999–present

Bob Daily is an American television producer and screenwriter.

== Career ==
Beginning as a writer for the 1990s Nickelodeon cartoon Rugrats, Daily joined the crew of the sitcom Frasier in 1999. In total, he wrote or co-wrote fifteen episodes of the series and was also one of the show's co-executive producers during its last years. He won two consecutive Writers Guild Awards in the category Outstanding Script – Episodic Comedy, for the episodes "Rooms with a View" (2002) and "No Sex, Please, We’re Skittish" (2003).

After Frasier concluded in 2004, Daily joined fellow Frasier writers Joe Keenan and Christopher Lloyd as a co-executive producer on their short lived sitcom Out of Practice.

In 2006, Daily and Keenan joined Desperate Housewives as a producer and writer. Following Keenan's departure from the show in 2007, Daily was promoted to executive producer, starting with the first episode of the fourth season. He served as showrunner for the eighth and final season. He wrote or co-wrote fourteen episodes, including the series finale in 2012, which he co-wrote with series creator Marc Cherry.

After Desperate Housewives, Daily left ABC for a development deal at CBS. He was the executive producer/showrunner for the CBS reboot of The Odd Couple, starring Matthew Perry and Thomas Lennon, for three seasons (2015–2017). In 2017, he co-created the series Superior Donuts, based on the Tracy Letts play, and served as executive producer/showrunner for two seasons.

Daily began his career as a journalist in Chicago, serving as Contributing Editor at Chicago magazine. He also wrote for Spy, Men's Journal, the Chicago Tribune and the Boston Globe.

== Early life and education ==
Daily graduated from Carleton College in 1982 with B.A. in English and received an M.A. in English from University of Chicago.

== Personal life ==
Daily is the husband of television publicist Janet Daily.
