= The Chase (Desperate Housewives) =

- Desperate Housewives episode
- Episode no.: Season 6 Episode 16
- Directed by: Larry Shaw
- Written by: John Pardee; Joey Murphy
- Production code: 616
- Original air date: February 28, 2010
- Running time: 43 minutes

Guest appearances
- Julie Benz as Robin Gallagher; Orson Bean as Roy Bender; Kevin Rahm as Lee McDermott; Tuc Watkins as Bob Hunter; Sam Page as Sam Allen; Josh Zuckerman as Eddie Orlofsky; Richard Gilliland as Dr. Brent Avedon; Shawn Pyfrom as Andrew Van de Kamp; Daniella Baltodano as Celia Solis; Earnestine Phillips as Detective Aguilar; Jeffrey Markle as Bus Driver; Eric Ian Colton as Tad

Episode chronology
| ← Previous "Lovely" | Next → "Chromolume No. 7" |
- Desperate Housewives season 6

"The Chase" is the sixteenth episode of the sixth season of the American comedy-drama series, Desperate Housewives, and the 127th overall episode of the series. It originally aired on ABC in the United States on February 28, 2010. In the episode, Gabrielle (Eva Longoria) gets a break from the children when one of them catches chickenpox, Lynette (Felicity Huffman) forgets her daughter's birthday, and Katherine (Dana Delany) continues to explore her feelings of lesbianism.

The episode was written by John Pardee and Joey Murphy, and directed by Larry Shaw. It included the third in a string of guest appearances by Julie Benz, a former stripper who serves as a romantic interest for Katherine. The pairing marked the first lesbian relationship in Desperate Housewives. "The Chase" also marked the first appearance of Samuel Page, who plays a mysterious man named Sam Allen who takes an unusually strong interest in Bree (Marcia Cross).

"The Chase" received generally mixed to negative reviews. According to Nielsen Media Research, the episode was seen by 10.89 million viewers, making it the second lowest rated Desperate Housewives episode at the time. Viewership for "The Chase" suffered due to competition from the 2010 Winter Olympics closing ceremony.

== Plot ==
=== Back story ===
Desperate Housewives focuses on the lives of several residents in the suburban neighborhood of Wisteria Lane. In recent episodes, Susan Mayer (Teri Hatcher) has encouraged a stripper Robin Gallagher (Julie Benz) to quit her job and turn her life around. Robin briefly lived with Susan but moved out after Susan became jealous of Robin living in the same house as her husband, Mike Delfino (James Denton). Robin moved in with Katherine Mayfair (Dana Delany) and revealed she was a lesbian, prompting the heterosexual Katherine to start developing romantic feelings for Robin. Lynette (Felicity Huffman) is pregnant, despite being a middle-aged career woman and already having four children. This has caused strain for Lynette and her husband, Tom Scavo (Doug Savant). Bree (Marcia Cross) is the ambitious owner of a catering company, and her son Andrew (Shawn Pyfrom) works as her personal assistant. Angie (Drea de Matteo) and Nick Bolen (Jeffrey Nordling) recently moved onto Wisteria Lane to escape circumstances in their old home in New York City that are yet to be fully explained. Gabrielle and her husband Carlos Solis (Ricardo Antonio Chavira) overheard the Bolens arguing about their circumstances, and have grown concerned about their niece Ana (Maiara Walsh) dating the Bolens' son, Danny (Beau Mirchoff). As a result, they convinced Ana to leave Danny and pursue her modeling career in New York City, but Danny has secretly gone into the city to find her.

=== Episode ===
Still struggling with her growing feelings of lesbianism, Katherine has a dream in which she seduces Robin. Katherine's therapist suggests she stop living with Robin because she is interfering with her recovery. Later, while celebrating Robin's new job, she accidentally spills champagne on her top and takes it off, causing Katherine to blurt out that she wants her to leave because she has feelings for her. Robin agrees to leave, but Katherine follows her upstairs, and they end up in bed together.

Celia Solis (Daniella Baltodano), one of the Solis' daughters, comes down with chickenpox. Since Gabrielle (Eva Longoria) has never had the illness, she is forced to leave the house. She stays with neighbors Bob (Tuc Watkins) and Lee (Kevin Rahm), and she enjoys partying and drinking with them so much she tries to prolong her visit. During a party, Gabrielle accidentally stumbles into a nursery, and learns Bob and Lee have been trying to adopt a baby. With a new appreciation for her children, Gabrielle returns home.

Distracted by her pregnancy, Lynette and Tom are horrified to realize they have forgotten their daughter Penny's (Kendall Applegate) birthday. Lynette tries to organize a last-minute party, but mistakenly has the wrong name written on her cake. Penny runs away and checks into a hotel room, where Lynette tracks her and apologizes. Penny said she is jealous of her unborn sister, but Lynette jokes the women will outnumber the men in the family when the baby is born.

One of Bree's employees, Tad (Eric Ian Colton), keeps making major mistakes, but Andrew defends him. Later, a mysterious man named Sam Allen (Samuel Page) visits Bree, insisting he understands her values and wants to work for her. Although initially hesitant, Bree is impressed and hires him. Later, Andrew gets upset when Bree plans to fire Tad, and Sam correctly assesses that Andrew is having an affair with him. Later, Sam hints to Bree that Andrew should be let go, then secretly drinks coffee from Andrew's "World's Greatest Son" mug.

Susan forced her elderly neighbor Roy (Orson Bean) to propose to his girlfriend Karen (Kathryn Joosten), and he does so after Karen indicates she wants to get married. Later, however, Roy laments to Susan about being put in the situation, and fears he will start lusting after other women now that he is engaged. Later, Karen learns she may have lung cancer. Roy tells Susan he is marrying Karen because he now realizes he does not want to lose Karen, and is sure she will beat the cancer.

Danny Bolen leaves a note claiming to be camping with his friend Eddie (Josh Zuckerman), but Angie runs into Eddie at a grocery store and realizes Danny has actually run off to New York City seeking Ana. Fearing a man from their past named Patrick will find Danny, Angie and Nick head to New York to find him.

== Production ==
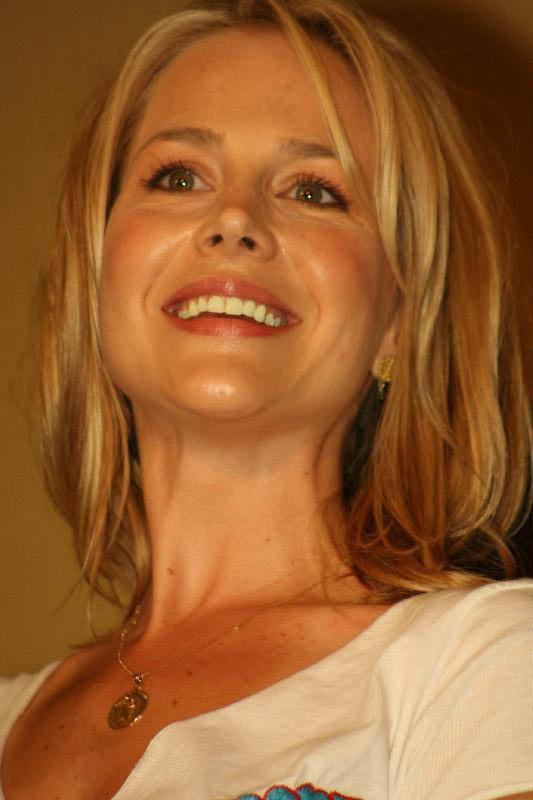
Julie Benz (pictured) continued a string of guest appearances in "The Chase" as former stripper Robin Gallagher.

"The Chase" was written by John Pardee and Joey Murphy, and directed by Larry Shaw. It originally aired on ABC in the United States on February 28, 2010, and was broadcast on CTV in Canada the same day. The episode introduced the character Sam Allen, a mysterious man who starts working for Bree and takes what appears to be an unusually strong interest in her. The character, who is set to appear in several episodes, is played by Samuel Page, an actor best known as the husband of Christina Hendricks' character Joan Holloway in the AMC drama series Mad Men. "The Chase" marked the third in a string of at least four guest appearances by actress Julie Benz as Robin Gallagher, a former stripper seeking a new life. Benz joined the show soon after her departure as a regular cast member from the Showtime drama series Dexter, where her character Rita Morgan was killed in the fourth season finale, "The Getaway".

"The Chase" continued an ongoing storyline of Katherine Mayfair exploring her sexuality. Actress Dana Delany praised the subplot. She said she did not know if the character would become a lesbian permanently, because the story lines change so often in Desperate Housewives, but that series creator Marc Cherry "is interested in playing the complexity of that". Delany compared Katherine's new realizations to that of actress Meredith Baxter, who realized she was a lesbian late in her life after entering into a relationship with a woman. Delany said she believed her character would be taken by surprise by the new feelings she is experiencing: "I think that she’s still so emotionally vulnerable from getting out of the loony bin, and I think she and Robin connect on a kind of wounded, emotional level. And I think if anything, she’s feeling this kind of emotional solace with her, and that draws her to Robin in a physical way, and that’s confusing to her."

== Reception ==
I have a few problems with [the Robin and Katherine romance] as a whole. First, isn't Desperate Housewives supposed to be all family- and Midwestern mom-friendly? I mean, I know we're progressing and all as a country, but I'm not really sure that the Betty Crockers of the world are gonna be all cheering for lady-on-lady action while their bundt cake cools.

— Tanner Stransky
Entertainment Weekly

In its original American broadcast, "The Chase" was seen by 10.89 million viewers, according to Nielsen Media Research. Among viewers between ages 18 and 49, it received a 3.6 rating/9 share, which at the time was the lowest rating for an individual episode of Desperate Housewives in series history. This continued a downward trend in the ratings for the show: each of the previous three episodes had been the lowest rated in series history until the airing of the next episode in the subsequent week. "The Chase" dropped in viewership three percent from the previous episode, "Lovely". Like that episode, "The Chase" suffered in the ratings partially due to competition from the NBC broadcast of the 2010 Winter Olympics, which drew an estimated 21.3 million viewers. Desperate Housewives was also outperformed by the CBS reality series Undercover Boss which, in its fourth episode, drew 15.15 million viewers.

The episode received generally mixed to negative reviews. Entertainment Weekly writer Tanner Stransky was highly critical of the episode, describing the Gabrielle story as predictable, the Susan subplot as boring and the overall Bolen story arc as too slow in developing. Stransky also felt the Katherine and Robin pairing was unbelievable, and questioned whether the show's audiences of families and midwesterners would respond well to a lesbian pairing. Gael Fashingbauer Cooper of MSNBC praised Longoria for turning what he said could have been a gloomy story into "a gleeful fantasy". Cooper said the character was fun and funny but ultimately heartfelt and caring. Conversely, Cooper said the subplots involving the other housewives were "all pretty standard, and dreary, stuff".

Los Angeles Times writer Gerrick Kennedy said he liked the Robin character's charm and chemistry with Katherine, and said their story arc "has already grown infinitely more interesting than the Angie Bolen mystery". He said the relationship made more sense for Katherine than her previous subplots involving her romance with Mike and her mental breakdown following their break-up. Isabelle Carreau of TV Squad said she was glad the episode was centered on the supporting cast, particularly praising the attention to Bob and Lee, but she said that did not like the direction the Andrew character had taken, and felt the relationship between Katherine and Robin had evolved too fast.
