= Lovely (Desperate Housewives) =

- Desperate Housewives episode
- Robin Gallagher (guest star Julie Benz) and Katherine Mayfair (Dana Delany) share a kiss. "Lovely" starts an ongoing storyline where Katherine explores her sexuality.
- Episode no.: Season 6 Episode 15
- Directed by: David Warren
- Written by: David Schladweiler
- Production code: 615
- Original air date: February 21, 2010
- Running time: 43 minutes

Guest appearances
- Julie Benz as Robin Gallagher; Orson Bean as Roy Bender; Eric Lutes as Guy #1; Scott Haven as Guy #2

Episode chronology
← Previous "The Glamorous Life"	Next → "The Chase"
- Desperate Housewives season 6

"Lovely" is the fifteenth episode of the sixth season of the American comedy-drama series, Desperate Housewives, and the 126th overall episode of the series. It originally aired on ABC in the United States on February 21, 2010. In the episode, former stripper Robin Gallagher (Julie Benz) interacts with each of the women of Wisteria Lane, drastically affecting their lives. She grows particularly close to Katherine Mayfair (Dana Delany), with whom she shares a kiss during a bar outing.

The episode was written by David Schladweiler and directed by David Warren. It included the second in a string of guest appearances by Benz, who had recently departed as a regular from the Showtime drama series, Dexter. "Lovely" introduced an ongoing storyline of Katherine exploring her sexuality, a subplot which was met with enthusiasm by actress Delany. The pairing between Robin and Katherine was the first lesbian relationship in Desperate Housewives.

"Lovely" received generally mixed reviews, with detractors criticizing it for failing to advance the show's plotlines. According to Nielsen ratings, the episode was seen by 10.9 million viewers, and matched the series low rating from the previous episode, "The Glamorous Life", although the subsequent episode, "The Chase", drew even poorer ratings. Viewership for "Lovely" suffered because of competition from the 2010 Winter Olympics.

== Plot ==
=== Back story ===
Desperate Housewives focuses on the lives of several residents on the suburban neighborhood of Wisteria Lane. In recent episodes, Susan Mayer (Teri Hatcher) has encouraged a stripper Robin Gallagher (Julie Benz) to quit her job and turn her life around. Susan invited Robin to move into her house until she gets back on her feet. Katherine Mayfair (Dana Delany) has been admitted to a psychiatric hospital after suffering a mental breakdown stemming from the breakup of her relationship with Mike Delfino (James Denton), who has since married Susan. Orson Hodge (Kyle MacLachlan) has recently learned that his wife, Bree Van de Kamp (Marcia Cross), was having an affair with Susan's ex-husband Karl Mayer (Richard Burgi). Orson has been using a wheelchair since Christmas, as a result of a small passenger plane crash landing into a building he and Karl were inside; Karl died as a result of the accident. Angie (Drea de Matteo) and Nick Bolen (Jeffrey Nordling) recently moved onto Wisteria Lane to escape circumstances that are yet to be fully explained; however, Gabrielle (Eva Longoria) and Carlos Solis (Ricardo Antonio Chavira) overheard the Bolens arguing about their circumstances, and have grown concerned about their niece Ana (Maiara Walsh) dating the Bolens' son, Danny (Beau Mirchoff).

=== Episode ===
As Robin becomes integrated into Wisteria Lane, she gradually begins to affect the lives of several of her new neighbors.

Lynette Scavo (Felicity Huffman), who is in the middle of celebrating her wedding anniversary with Tom (Doug Savant), grows angry when she learns her son Parker (Joshua Logan Moore) is spying on Robin while she showers next door. Lynette rudely confronts Robin, who tells Lynette that Parker offered her money to have sex with him. Later, Parker tells his parents he is the only one of his friends who have not had sex. Tom assures him it will happen when the time is right, and Lynette apologizes to Robin.

Later, Robin learns Bree has had trouble connecting with Orson due to her recent affair. Robin suggests Bree restart their sex life, prompting Bree to later try giving Orson a lap-dance. The dance proves awkward, especially when Bree falls over and Orson runs over her foot with the wheelchair. Bree explains she wants to become intimate with her husband again, and the two share a romantic moment.

Meanwhile, Gabrielle and Carlos plot to break up Ana and Danny. Gabrielle arranges for an old photographer friend in New York City to help Ana with her modeling career, but she turns down the offer because of her relationship with Danny. After Robin tells Gabrielle that she gave up a career in ballet for a boy in her youth, only for the boy to break up with her two months later, and that she then got in a car crash ruining her chances of a future in ballet, Gabrielle convinces Robin to tell the story to Ana. Ana breaks up with Danny and leaves for New York, but after Robin realizes she has been used, she speaks to Danny, who secretly leaves town in a taxi to chase after Ana.

Susan grows jealous when Robin starts giving Mike massages to ease his sore back. Susan tries to give Mike a massage, but being the klutz that Susan is, ends up putting him in the hospital. Susan confesses her jealousy to Robin, who decides to preserve their friendship by moving out.

Robin becomes a roommate to Katherine, who is still feeling depressed after her recent stint in a mental hospital. Robin encourages Katherine to go out to a bar, and the two have a great time. When two men hit on Robin and show no interest in Katherine, Robin shows them up by kissing Katherine on the lips. Katherine initially laughs at the funny moment, but later learns Robin really is a lesbian. Katherine insists she is not interested in women when Robin suggests she explores the possibility, but later it appears that Katherine may be intrigued by the idea.

== Production ==
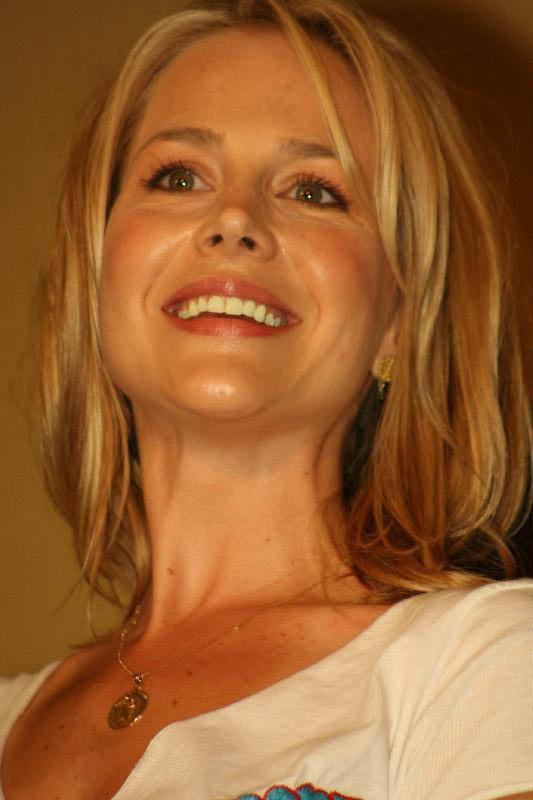
Julie Benz (pictured) continued a string of guest appearances in "Lovely" as former stripper Robin Gallagher.

"Lovely" was written by David Schladweiler and directed by David Warren. It marked the second in a string of at least four guest appearances by actress Julie Benz as Robin Gallagher, a former stripper seeking a new life. Benz joined the show soon after her departure as a regular cast member from the Showtime drama series Dexter, where her character Rita Morgan was killed in the fourth season finale, "The Getaway". Benz said of her role in Desperate Housewives, "I love the show so much, and I am honored to be part of the whole [world] of Wisteria Lane. And to work with all these great, amazing women! I've done a lot of male-dominated movies and television shows, so it's so amazing for me to be a part of a show that is female-dominated."

"Lovely" introduced an ongoing storyline of Katherine Mayfair exploring her sexuality. Actress Dana Delany, who previously played a lesbian character in the Showtime series The L Word, said she felt the subplot was an excellent idea: "A lot of the ladies on the set have said, 'Why has this not happened before?' I think everybody wanted to be the one who got to do it." In an interview with E! Online, actress Marcia Cross jokingly said of the kiss scene, "I'm a little jealous that I'm not involved. What is going on?" Delany said she did not know if the character would become a lesbian permanently, because the story lines change so often in Desperate Housewives, but that series creator Marc Cherry "is interested in playing the complexity of that".

Delany compared Katherine's new realizations to that of actress Meredith Baxter, who realized she was a lesbian late in her life after entering into a relationship with a woman. Delany said she believed her character would be taken by surprise by the new feelings she is experiencing: "I think that she’s still so emotionally vulnerable from getting out of the loony bin, and I think she and Robin connect on a kind of wounded, emotional level. And I think if anything, she’s feeling this kind of emotional solace with her, and that draws her to Robin in a physical way, and that’s confusing to her." Delany and Benz were both sick when they filmed their kiss scene. Benz said of the scene, "Dana's a great kisser." Delany said more male crew members were present for the filming of the lesbian kiss scene than usual due to the sensuality of the scene.

== Reception ==
In its original American broadcast on February 21, 2010, "Lovely" was seen by 10.9 million viewers, according to Nielsen ratings, which is 20 percent below the season average. Among viewers between ages 18 and 49, it received a 3.7 rating/9 share; a share represents the percentage of households using a television at the time the program is airing. This rating matched the previous episode, "The Glamorous Life", for the lowest rating for an individual episode of Desperate Housewives in series history. However, it held that distinction only two weeks before "The Glamorous Life", and the subsequent episode "The Chase", received even lower ratings. "Lovely" continued a downward trend in the ratings: "The Glamorous Life" was seen by 11.82 million viewers, and the previous episode, "How About a Friendly Shrink?", was seen by 11.2 million viewers and achieved the lowest rating of the series at the time. "Lovely" suffered in the ratings partially due to competition from the NBC broadcast of the 2010 Winter Olympics. The day "Lovely" was originally broadcast, the 2010 Winter Olympics drew an average of 24.67 million viewers during the episode's 9 p.m. timeslot. Desperate Housewives was also outperformed by the CBS reality series Undercover Boss which, in its third episode, drew 13.6 million viewers.

Overall, this episode was much like a 2 a.m. visit to a strip club with your too-bombed friends: a thoroughly bad idea that you always regret in the morning. Do we think the Desperate Housewives producers are feeling hungover this morning and regretting what they did with Robin the former stripper?

— Tanner Stransky,
Entertainment Weekly

"Lovely" received generally mixed reviews. Gerrick D. Kennedy of the Los Angeles Times said he was initially skeptical of the Robin and Katherine romance subplot, but said he liked how it was presented. "It wasn’t contrived like other girl-on-girl scenes on television that we see. ... I just hate it when it’s used to seem 'edgy' or to sell an episode, and I hope that isn't the case here." Kennedy said the Bree and Orson scenes led to "a tender moment", but said Susan was annoying and the Lynette plotline was somewhat insulting toward women. Isabelle Carreau of TV Squad said he was surprised Robin's back story was fleshed out so quickly, and speculated it could lead to a permanent role in the series. Carreau said the pairing of Robin and Katherine could be "very interesting", and that the best part of the episode was the comical conversation between Robin and Karen McCluskey (Kathryn Joosten) at the end.

Entertainment Weekly writer Tanner Stransky criticized "Lovely" for stringing together several uninteresting and unfunny segments rather than advancing existing plotlines or introducing new ones. He was particularly critical of the Susan and Lynette segments, but said the introduction of Katherine's possible lesbianism was "intriguing for the moment". Gael Fashingbauer Cooper of MSNBC also criticized the episode for failing to advance the plot, and sarcastically wrote of the Katherine development, "Oh, because lesbian storylines have worked so well on this show in the past, except, never." Cooper said the segment involving Robin and Bree was the only one that didn't feel "stilted and sad".
