= How About a Friendly Shrink? =

- Desperate Housewives episode
- Episode no.: Season 6 Episode 13
- Directed by: Lonny Price
- Written by: Jason Ganzel
- Production code: 613
- Original air date: January 17, 2010
- Running time: 43 minutes

Guest appearances
- Tuc Watkins as Bob Hunter; Kevin Rahm as Lee McDermott; John Rubinstein as Principal Hobson; Patricia Bethune as Orson physiotherapist; Jane Leeves as Dr. Graham

Episode chronology
| ← Previous "You Gotta Get a Gimmick" | Next → "The Glamorous Life" |
- Desperate Housewives season 6

"How About a Friendly Shrink?" is the thirteenth episode of the sixth season of the American comedy-drama series, Desperate Housewives, and the 124th overall episode of the series. It originally aired on ABC in the United States on January 17, 2010. In the episode, Tom tries to convince Lynette to seek marriage counseling, Gabrielle clashes with Susan about their children's intelligence, and Bree tries to care for an increasingly irritable Orson.

The episode was written by Jason Ganzel and directed by Lonny Price. "How About a Friendly Shrink?" marked the return of Katherine Mayfair, portrayed by Dana Delany, who had been not appeared since the episode "Boom Crunch". It also featured Jane Leeves, who previously starred as Daphne Moon on the American NBC sitcom Frasier, in a guest appearance as Tom and Lynette's therapist, Dr. Graham.

"How About a Friendly Shrink?" received generally mixed reviews. According to Nielsen Media Research, the episode was seen by 11.2 million viewers. It was the lowest rating for an individual Desperate Housewives in the series' history, a distinction it held only two weeks until the subsequent episode, "The Glamorous Life", drew even poorer ratings. The viewership for "How About a Friendly Shrink?" suffered due to competition from the 67th Golden Globe Awards on NBC and the two-hour eighth season premiere of 24 on Fox.

The title of this episode is taken from a line in the song "Country House" which was written for the London premiere of the Stephen Sondheim musical, "Follies".

== Plot ==
When he learns that Bob (Tuc Watkins) and Lee (Kevin Rahm) are seeing a counselor, Tom (Doug Savant) suggests going to one with Lynette (Felicity Huffman), but she insists therapy is for "losers". Tom starts seeing a therapist on his own and keeping a "feelings" journal, which he will not let Lynette read. Angrily, she visits the therapist, Dr. Graham (Jane Leeves), to defend herself from what she is sure is Tom's badmouthing. She admits she gets mad when she is not in control. When Dr. Graham equates this to the lack of control Lynette felt in losing her baby, Lynette reluctantly sits down on the couch. Later, when Tom returns from work, Lynette informs him they will be going to therapy together.

Using a wheelchair, Orson (Kyle MacLachlan) continues to order Bree (Marcia Cross) around at his whim and refuses to let her give him a bath. When Orson refuses to say please while Bree brings him breakfast, she places the waffles on a shelf he cannot reach. When the physical therapist arrives, he pretends to be starving and abused. The therapist tells Bree she must be more patient, or she will be reported. Later, when Orson still refuses to be bathed, Bree takes him outside and sprays him with the garden hose until he begs her to stop. He breaks down and admits he is miserable at the prospective of a life in which he needs to ask for help for everything. Bree finally understands, and asks Orson for forgiveness.

The Oakridge students are placed into learning groups named after animals in math class. Gabrielle (Eva Longoria) initially suspects her daughter Juanita (Madison De La Garza), who is in the Leopards, is among the slow group, whereas Susan (Teri Hatcher) is pleased that her son M.J. (Mason Vale Cotton) is in the Giraffes, which she believes are advanced. This leads to competitive behavior between the two women. Eventually, by taking pictures of different students' homework and studying them, Gabrielle realizes the Leopards are actually advanced and the Giraffes are slow. When Susan realizes this, she confronts a teacher in public, exposing the secret code of the animal groups to other mothers. While Susan and Gabrielle wait to talk to the principal, they both admit they got carried away and confess fears that they are letting their children down.

Angie (Drea de Matteo) takes an instant dislike to her son Danny's (Beau Mirchoff) new girlfriend, Ana (Maiara Walsh), who she fears is too fun-loving and not serious enough. However, Danny feels comfortable talking to Ana, who seems to understand what he has been through. Ana assures Angie she is not going anywhere. Meanwhile, Katherine (Dana Delany) speaks to her psychiatrist at a mental clinic. She says the medicine is working, but she now realizes the person she has become and how much she has hurt her neighbors and friends. Karen (Kathryn Joosten) visits her and asks her to return to Wisteria Lane, but Katherine refuses because she does not feel she will be forgiven. Later, Karen returns with Bree, Lynette, Gabrielle, and Susan, who comfort Katherine and say they will try to forgive her.

== Production ==
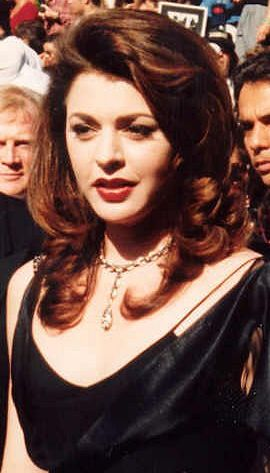
Jane Leeves, who previously starred as Daphne Moon on the American NBC sitcom Frasier, made a guest appearance in "How About a Friendly Shrink?"

"How About a Friendly Shrink?" was written by Jason Ganzel and directed by Lonny Price. It first aired on January 17, 2010 in the United States on ABC. The episode marked the return of Katherine Mayfair, who had been absent since the episode "Boom Crunch", in which she suffered a nervous breakdown. Jane Leeves, who previously starred as Daphne Moon on the American NBC sitcom Frasier, made a guest appearance as Tom and Lynette's therapist, Dr. Graham. She is slated to appear in at least one more episode.

Leeves is the third former star of Frasier to make a guest appearance in Desperate Housewives. Harriet Sansom Harris, who played talent agent Bebe Glazer on the sitcom, played recurring character Felicia Tilman in the first, second and seventh season of Desperate Housewives. Peri Gilpin, who played Roz Doyle in Frasier, has also appeared in the show, and Joe Keenan, former show runner on Frasier, serves as a consulting producer for Desperate Housewives.

== Reception ==
In its original American broadcast on January 17, 2010, "How About a Friendly Shrink?" was seen by 11.2 million viewers, according to Nielsen Media Research. At the time, it was the lowest rating for an individual Desperate Housewives in the series' history. However, it held that distinction only two weeks before "The Glamorous Life", and the subsequent episode "Lovely", received even lower ratings. The viewership for "How About a Friendly Shrink?" suffered due to competition from the 67th Golden Globe Awards on NBC (which drew 16.9 million viewers) and the two-hour seventh season premiere of 24 on Fox (which drew 11.4 million viewers). "How About a Friendly Shrink?" received a 3.7 rating/9 share among viewers aged between 18 and 49. The overall rating was a 21 percent drop in viewership from the previous week's episode, "You Gotta Get a Gimmick".

Other than perhaps Katherine's loony bin storyline, Desperate Housewives' "How About a Friendly Shrink?" didn't really push things forward, plot-wise, but it's still good for a few laughs, and a few heart-wrenching scenes and dialogues, which as we all know is the minimum requirement.

— Glenn Diaz, BuddyTV

"How About a Friendly Shrink?" received generally mixed reviews. Gerrick Kennedy of the Los Angeles Times praised the episode and was particularly excited by the guest appearance by Jane Leeves. She called the subplot between Gaby and Susan was "cute, but honest", but felt the Orson and Katherine characters have "run their course". Entertainment Weekly writer Tanner Stransky declared the reappearance of Katherine Mayfair was the only interesting element of the episode, and that it was touching to see her realize the damage she had done. Stransky wrote, "The rest of the story lines from last night just kind of sat there rather limply," and said the Orson and Bree story, and Tom and Lynette's therapy, "just seemed so dumpy for this once-sexy show".

DeAnn Welker of MSNBC complimented the Katherine homecoming, and said the best line of the episode was Karen McCluskey's response when Katherine rejected visitors: "Who says I'm visiting? Maybe I'm bonkers too." Welker, however, was critical of the subplot between Gaby and Susan, who she said were "stuck in storylines-that-don’t-matter territory." Glenn Diaz of BuddyTV felt the episode did little to advance the overall plot of the series, but included some strong scenes and good jokes. Diaz called the Orson and Bree subplot "heartbreaking", and said he was able to empathize with Katherine for the first time in many episodes. Isabelle Carreau of TV Squad called Orson particularly unlikeable in the episode, but declared the Lynette and Tom subplot "fun and touching at the same time", and said the Ana character showed new depths that had not been shown before.
