= Nice Is Different Than Good =

- Desperate Housewives episode
- Episode no.: Season 6 Episode 1
- Directed by: Larry Shaw
- Written by: Marc Cherry
- Production code: 601
- Original air date: September 27, 2009
- Running time: 44 minutes

Guest appearances
- Richard Burgi as Karl Mayer; Kevin Rahm as Lee McDermott; James McDonnell as Dr. Crane; Jennifer Radelet as Peggy; Steve Tyler as Minister; Winston Story as Johnny; Jack Impelizzeri as Moving Man

Episode chronology
← Previous "If It's Only In Your Head"	Next → "Being Alive"
- Desperate Housewives season 6

"Nice Is Different Than Good" is the sixth-season premiere episode of the American comedy-drama series Desperate Housewives, and the 112th overall episode of the series. It originally aired in the United States on September 27, 2009, on ABC. In the episode, Mike (James Denton) marries Susan (Teri Hatcher) and Angie Bolen (Drea de Matteo) and her family move onto Wisteria Lane as they attempt to escape their sordid past.

The episode was written by series creator Marc Cherry and directed by Larry Shaw. It included the introduction of the Angie character, as well as her husband, Nick (Jeffrey Nordling), and their son, Danny (Beau Mirchoff). The Bolen family is the subject of the series' yearly mystery. "Nice Is Different Than Good" enacted the long-running storylines of Katherine's (Dana Delany) nervous breakdown, Lynette's (Felicity Huffman) attempts to conceal her pregnancy, and the Fairview serial strangler.

"Nice Is Different Than Good" received generally positive reviews, with critics raving about the rivalry between Susan and Katherine and the possible connection between the Bolen and serial strangler storylines. According to Nielsen ratings, the episode drew 13.6 million viewers, the smallest audience for a Desperate Housewives season premiere until the seventh-season premiere on September 26, 2010.

== Plot ==
=== Background ===
Desperate Housewives focuses on the lives of several residents in the suburban neighborhood of Wisteria Lane. In recent episodes, Mike Delfino (James Denton) married an unidentified bride, who was either Susan Mayer (Teri Hatcher), his ex-wife, or Katherine Mayfair (Dana Delany), his fiancée and Susan's close friend. Lynette Scavo (Felicity Huffman) learned that she and her husband, Tom (Doug Savant), are expecting twins, two of what will be six children. Gabrielle (Eva Longoria) and Carlos Solis (Ricardo Antonio Chavira) agreed to take in his niece, Ana (Maiara Walsh), and she and Gabrielle began to antagonize one another. Bree Hodge (Marcia Cross) sought a divorce from her husband, Orson (Kyle MacLachlan); however, Orson refused to end their marriage and blackmailed her into staying in the relationship. As a result, Bree began an affair with her divorce lawyer and Susan's ex-husband, Karl Mayer (Richard Burgi).

=== Episode ===
In the eight weeks leading up to her wedding, Susan avoids any contact with Katherine. Katherine begins to resent Susan, even threatening to pour tomato sauce on Susan's wedding dress. Mike is concerned for Katherine, but Susan is frustrated with her behavior. On the day of the wedding, Katherine demands that Susan apologize to her in public. Susan obliges, expressing her sorrow to Katherine during the wedding ceremony. Katherine tells Susan that the apology does not help mend their friendship.

Angie (Drea de Matteo) and Nick Bolen (Jeffrey Nordling) move into a house on Wisteria Lane with their college-bound son, Danny (Beau Mirchoff). Danny takes interest in Julie Mayer (Andrea Bowen), Susan's daughter, and asks her to start tutoring him. She agrees, but at Nick's urging, tells Danny that she is not interested in a relationship. Later, elderly neighbor Karen McCluskey (Kathryn Joosten) sees Julie and Danny arguing. On Susan and Mike's wedding night, Julie is strangled outside of her home by an unidentified attacker, who flees the scene.

Lynette grows increasingly weary at the idea of having more children. She confesses to Tom that while she began loving her other children before they were born, she does not have the same feelings for her unborn twins. Tom assures her that she will love them once she is able to hold them in her arms. At Lynette's request, the couple conceals the pregnancy from their family and friends. Meanwhile, Gabrielle is irritated with Ana's poor attitude, provocative wardrobe, and disregard for her curfew or other rules. Carlos insists that Gabrielle sign a contract that would make her Ana's legal guardian, but she refuses. However, when Ana expresses interest in becoming a model, Gabrielle understands that they are more alike than she initially thought and signs the guardianship documents.

Bree continues to hide her affair with Karl, but her difficulty with adjusting to the sinful and secretive lifestyle prompt Karl to end the affair. In that time, Orson suggests that they enter marriage counseling, but Bree insists that she no longer sees herself as his wife, but rather his captive. Realizing that guilt is a small price for happiness, Bree reignites her affair with Karl.

== Production ==
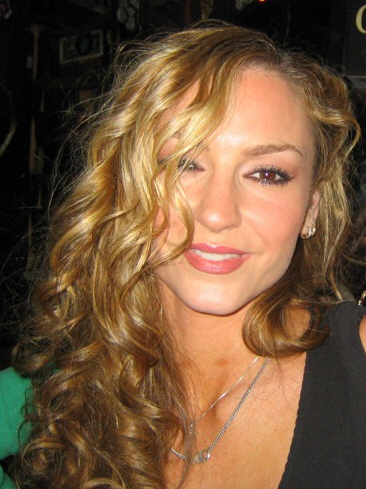
Drea de Matteo made her debut appearance as Italian matriarch Angie Bolen in the episode.

"Nice Is Different Than Good" was written by series creator and executive producer Marc Cherry and directed by Larry Shaw. It marked the debut of Drea de Matteo as Angie Bolen, the matriarch of an Italian family. While brainstorming ideas for the sixth season, the Desperate Housewives writing staff decided to introduce an Italian New Yorker housewife, as she would be unlike the other title characters. When she was offered the role of Angie, de Matteo was best known for her Emmy Award-winning performance as Adriana La Cerva on The Sopranos, an HBO drama series about the Italian Mafia. She accepted the offer without knowing the character's name or storyline. Cherry described the Angie character as "a very loving but tough Italian woman who comes [to Wisteria Lane] with her husband and her kid ... [and] will do what she has to to protect her family." Jeffrey Nordling and Beau Mirchoff made their series debuts in this episode as well, appearing as Nick, Angie's landscaper husband, and Danny, their "tightly-wound" son, respectively. Maiara Walsh also joined the cast as a series regular, having made her debut as Ana Solis in a guest starring capacity during season five.

"Nice Is Different Than Good" revealed the identity of Mike Delfino's bride, a mystery which served as the cliffhanger for the fifth season finale. Cherry revealed that he initially intended to have Mike marry Katherine Mayfair rather than Susan Mayer, but fans "were insistent" on having Mike marry Susan. As a result, Cherry decided to change the storyline "as opposed to frustrating the fans for another year by keeping Mike and Susan apart." The episode also introduced the long-running storyline of Katherine suffering a nervous breakdown after losing Mike to Susan. Cherry commented that it would be "one of the funniest breakdowns you've ever seen." Actress Dana Delany, who portrays Katherine, was not informed about the storyline change until a week before the episode began filming. She called the change "brilliant" and was pleased with her character's new storyline "because happiness is great in life, but it's kind of [sic] boring dramatically." To keep the identity of Mike's bride confidential, a stunt actress was used in the season five finale. When filming of the episode took place in July 2009, both Hatcher and Delany were photographed wearing wedding dresses on set. "Nice Is Different Than Good" also introduced the secondary ongoing mystery of the Fairview strangler. The episode ended with a cliffhanger in which Julie Mayer is strangled by an unknown attacker. Cherry said of the storyline, "I've come up with my own version of 'Who Shot J.R.?'," referencing the murder mystery plotline surrounding the J. R. Ewing character (Larry Hagman) in the popular primetime soap opera Dallas.

== Reception ==
=== Ratings ===
According to Nielsen ratings, "Nice Is Different Than Good" was seen by 13.643 million viewers and held an 8.6 rating/13 share on its original American broadcast on September 27, 2009. Among viewers between 18 and 49 years of age, the episode drew a 4.7 rating. The episode is the least-watched season premiere of Desperate Housewives at the time, with a thirty-five percent decrease in viewers from the fifth season premiere a year earlier. The seventh season premiere drew in lower ratings, with 13.056 million viewers and an 8.1 rating/12 share on its September 26, 2010 broadcast. "Nice Is Different Than Good" was outperformed by the following episode, "Being Alive", on October 4, which drew 14.641 million viewers and a 9.2 rating/14 share in the 18-49 demographic. Nevertheless, the premiere episode had a higher viewership than the season six average of 12.823 million viewers and 4.2 rating in the 18-49 demographic per episode. The episode was outperformed by Sunday Night Football on NBC, which drew 18.461 million viewers in the Desperate Housewives timeslot.

=== Critical reception ===
I say to naysayers who claim the hydrangeas on Wisteria Lane have lost their pungent fragrance: think again. In my opinion, at six seasons in, the show is better than ever.

— Tanner Stransky, Entertainment Weekly

The episode received critical acclaim. Tanner Stransky of Entertainment Weekly praised the Julie storyline and expressed sympathy for the Katherine character. Additionally, while he enjoyed the introduction of the Bolen family, he commented that "it's not even worth speculating [about the Bolens] because the family honestly didn't reveal anything much about themselves." He also noted the realness of the Lynette story and the comedic relief provided by the Gabrielle and Bree stories. Isabelle Carreau of TV Squad also gave the episode a positive review, expressing interest in Katherine's storyline now that Mike has married Susan. She declared, "Karl and Bree are now my favorite couple on Wisteria Lane. They are twisted, flawed and complex characters," calling the pair reminiscent of Bree and Orson when the first started dating. She also credited the introduction of the Ana character for making the Gabrielle story "really fun to watch" and complimented Beau Mirchoff's portrayal of the "extremely weird" Danny Bolen character, speculating that he strangled Julie.

USA Today's Robert Bianco awarded the season premiere three out of four stars, opining that the episode "starts with a bang, ends with a cliffhanger jolt, and offers a good story for each of the wives in between while dropping a possibly worthy new addition in their midst." He predicted that viewers would be satisfied with the revelation of the mystery bride's identity and commented: "There's humor and poignancy in all the stories and good work all around." Bianco praised Felicity Huffman's "strong and varied" acting skills, complimented Eva Longoria's comedic talents, and declared Richard Burgi's performance as his best in the entire series. He concluded that while the show has declined in quality since its first season, "it remains a very good TV series" and noted that "there's also the potential for a season that returns this already-solid show to top form." TV Guide writer Mickey O'Connor was negative in his review. He criticized the Lynette story as being "an awful development" and said the chemistry between actress de Matteo and her costars "a little off." However, he was more receptive of Katherine's reaction to losing Mike, saying "what could have played out as a typical weepy, hos-before-bros make-up session has been elevated to something much richer."
