= Desperate Housewives season 6 =

Desperate Housewives
- Season 6
- ABC promotional poster for the sixth season of Desperate Housewives. From left to right: Bree, Gabrielle, Susan, Katherine, and Lynette.
- Starring: Teri Hatcher; Felicity Huffman; Marcia Cross; Eva Longoria; Ricardo Antonio Chavira; Doug Savant; Kyle MacLachlan; Dana Delany; Drea de Matteo; Maiara Walsh; Brenda Strong; James Denton
- No. of episodes: 23

Release
- Original network: ABC
- Original release: September 27, 2009 – May 16, 2010

Season chronology
- ← Previous; Season 5 Next → Season 7

The sixth season of Desperate Housewives, a television series created by Marc Cherry, began airing on September 27, 2009, and concluded on May 16, 2010. The season consists of 23 episodes. The deceased Mary Alice Young continues to narrate the events in the lives of her friends and Wisteria Lane residents, Susan Delfino, Lynette Scavo, Bree Hodge, Gabrielle Solis and Katherine Mayfair. Angie Bolen and her family are the focus of this season's mystery.

The sixth season of Desperate Housewives began on RTÉ Two in the Republic of Ireland on Tuesday, January 5, 2010. The sixth season also started airing at 10:00 pm on Channel 4 in the United Kingdom on January 27, 2010, as well as on the Seven Network in Australia on February 1, 2010. It started airing at 9:00 pm on February 1, 2010, on OSN's Show Series in the Middle East. It also started airing in India on Star World from February 26, 2010, at 10 pm. In France, Season 6 began airing in the translated version on April 1, 2010 on Canal +.

The series saw lower ratings in the sixth season. In the first 12 episodes, the series attracted very similar viewership to the second half of the fifth season; however, the ratings declined heavily after the thirteenth episode, "How About a Friendly Shrink?", due to the competition with the 67th Golden Globe Awards. The series continued to lower numbers, with further competitions like the 2010 Grammy Awards, 2010 Winter Olympics, and the new CBS reality series Undercover Boss, which first aired after the Super Bowl XLIV, pulling impressive ratings. Desperate Housewives lost much steam in the second half of its season, picking up some again in the final three episodes.

Nonetheless, the show was the twentieth most watched series in the 2009–2010 television season, averaging 12.82 million viewers (tenth, in scripted shows). When adding DVR figures, the show ranked at thirteenth place (seventh, among scripted shows) with 14.13 million viewers. The sixth season ranked fourteenth in the important, advertiser-coveted 18–49 age group, with a 4.2 rating, sixth highest with scripted shows. After including DVR playback (Live+7 days), the season average number increased to a 5.0 rating, placing eighth, in terms of scripted shows.

== Production ==
The first episode of the sixth season, "Nice is Different Than Good", began airing on September 27, 2009. The series creator, Marc Cherry, told Entertainment Weekly that the bride's initial identity was to be Katherine and that Susan was the one who was going to have a nervous breakdown, until viewers informed him that they would rather see Susan and Mike reconcile. Cherry explained: "I originally was going to have Mike marry Katherine, but as I went out into the world on vacation and just started talking to people they were so determined that Mike and Susan should get together; they were so insistent on it. So I started to think, 'What if I went that way?' And it occurred to me that it might be a more effective way to go as opposed to frustrating the fans for another year by keeping Mike and Susan apart. The fans demanded it in a voice so loud I was kind of scared to go against them". Cherry also hinted that the couple's marriage "plays better for this season's mystery". Cherry also said that Katherine will suffer a breakdown, adding: "And it's going to be one of the funniest breakdowns you've ever seen". Marc Cherry revealed that the sixth season mystery will pay homage to a classic Dallas storyline. He added: "What we've planned is an interesting mystery storyline involving one of our beloved characters. It's a 'Who shot J.R.?' kind of storyline. For the mid-season cliffhanger, Marc Cherry has revealed that there would be a plane crash in season six of Desperate Housewives. The show's creator explained that the story is still in the planning stages and added that he does not yet know who will be involved in the accident. "It's going to be my cliffhanger for the first half of the season," he said, adding that it would "affect everyone's lives". However, Cherry said that none of the main characters will be killed in the crash. "I'd love to kill somebody 'cause that's just what I do," he joked. "But the truth is, right now I don't have anyone major dying."

== Cast ==
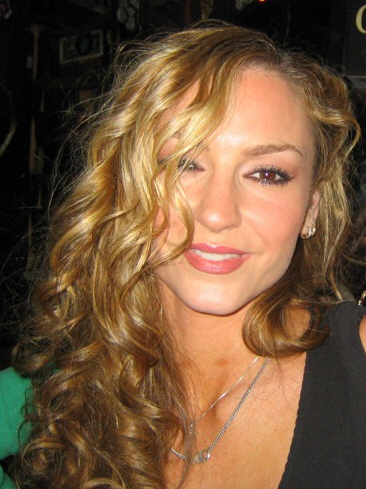
De Matteo's character was the subject of the season's main mystery.

The sixth season had twelve roles receiving star billing, with ten out of thirteen returning from the previous season. The series is narrated by Brenda Strong, who portrays the deceased Mary Alice Young, as she observes from beyond the grave the lives of the Wisteria Lane residents and her former best friends. Teri Hatcher portrayed Susan Mayer, who is married to Mike again. Felicity Huffman portrayed Lynette Scavo, who is trying to conceal her pregnancy in order to keep her job. Marcia Cross portrayed Bree Hodge, who is having an affair with her divorce lawyer. Eva Longoria portrayed Gabrielle Solis, who now deals with her teenage niece. Ricardo Antonio Chavira portrayed Carlos Solis, Gabrielle's husband and Lynette's new boss. Doug Savant portrayed Tom Scavo, Lynette's husband who returns to college. Kyle MacLachlan portrayed Orson Hodge, who suffers a terrible accident while trying to save his marriage to Bree. Dana Delaney portrayed Katherine Mayfair, who endures a mental breakdown after Mike leaves her to remarry Susan. James Denton portrayed Mike Delfino, Susan's husband who deals with his ex-girlfriend and with a financial crisis. New additions to the main cast included Drea de Matteo playing Angie Bolen, whose mysterious arc is the season's main storyline, and Maiara Walsh in the role of Ana Solis, Carlos's rebellious niece who moved to Wisteria Lane in the fifth season finale. Shawn Pyfrom did not return as a regular; he instead made guest appearances as Andrew Van de Kamp, Bree's gay son.

The "also starring" cast had many changes. Andrea Bowen re-joined the cast as Julie Mayer, Susan's daughter and victim of the Fairview strangler. Long-time supporting actress Kathryn Joosten was promoted to also starring as elderly neighbor Karen McCluskey. Jeffrey Nordling and Beau Mirchoff appeared as Nick and Danny Bolen, respectively Angie's husband and son. Charlie Carver (Porter Scavo), Joshua Logan Moore (Parker Scavo) and Kendall Applegate (Penny Scavo) all remained, while Max Carver left the also starring cast, as his character Preston Scavo has left for Europe, but made guest appearances in the season. Additionally, child actors Madison De La Garza (Juanita Solis) and Mason Vale Cotton (M.J. Delfino) were promoted from co-stars to also starring.

This season featured many established and new guest stars. Tuc Watkins and Kevin Rahm respectively played Bob Hunter and Lee McDermott, a gay couple and residents of Wisteria Lane. Part of Bree's storyline were Richard Burgi portraying Karl Mayer, Susan's ex-husband and Bree's divorce lawyer and new lover, Dakin Matthews returning as Reverend Sykes, reverend at the local Presbyterian church, Samuel Page appearing as Sam Allen, Rex's son conceived before he meets Bree, and Joy Lauren in the role of Danielle Katz, Bree's daughter. Part of Gabrielle's storyline were Daniella Baltodano playing Celia Solis, Gabrielle's youngest daughter, Jesse Metcalfe returning as John Rowland, Gabrielle's ex-lover and former gardener, Jeff Doucette portraying Father Crowley, priest at the local Catholic church, and John Rubinstein appearing as Principal Hobson, headmaster at Juanita and M.J.'s school. Part of Lynette's storyline were Helena Mattsson in the role of Irina Korsakov, Preston's Russian fiancée, and Brent Kinsman, Shane Kinsman and Zane Huett returning as the younger versions of Preston, Porter and Parker Scavo in flashbacks. Part of Katherine's storyline were Lyndsy Fonseca who returned for one episode in the role of Dylan Mayfair, Katherine's daughter, and Julie Benz portraying Robin Gallagher, a stripper and Katherine's new love interest. Part of the main mystery arc were John Barrowman appearing as Patrick Logan, an eco-terrorist and Danny's biological father, Julie McNiven playing Emily Portsmith, a barista at a local cafe and acquaintance of Nick, and Ellen Crawford portraying Iris Beckley, a neighbor of Angie's mother that informs Patrick of the Bolens' whereabouts. Orson Bean was introduced in the role of Roy Bender, Mrs. McCluskey's new boyfriend. Josh Zuckerman appeared as Eddie Orlofsky, the infamous Fairview strangler. Maria Cominis played Mona Clarke, a Wisteria Lane resident who blackmails Angie when she discovers her secret. Mindy Sterling portrayed Mitzi Kinsky, a new neighbor in Wisteria Lane. Furthermore, Mark Moses returned in the season finale as Paul Young, Mary Alice's widower.

== Episodes ==
No. overall	No. in season	Title	Directed by	Written by	Original release date	U.S. viewers (millions)
112	1	"Nice Is Different Than Good"	Larry Shaw	Marc Cherry	September 27, 2009	13.64
Mike's bride is revealed to be Susan. On the day of the wedding, Katherine storms into the church and demands a public apology from Susan. Susan obliges, expressing her sorrow to Katherine during the ceremony, but Katherine still refuses to forgive Susan. Bree continues her affair with Karl but later ends it, feeling increasingly guilty. Since Orson still refuses to grant her a divorce, Bree reignites the affair. Gabrielle grows irritated with Ana's rebellious attitude. Upon learning that Ana aspires to become a model and had a similarly difficult upbringing, Gabrielle agrees to become her legal guardian. Lynette tearfully confesses to Tom that she does not love her unborn twins; he assures her that she will love the babies once they are born. Angie and Nick Bolen move onto Wisteria Lane with their 19-year-old son, Danny, hiding a dark past. Danny becomes acquainted with Julie, but Karen later witnesses the two arguing. One night, Julie is strangled outside her home by an unidentified assailant, who flees the scene.
113	2	"Being Alive"	David Grossman	Matt Berry	October 4, 2009	14.64
The morning after the attack, Karen and her new boyfriend Roy find Julie unconscious. At the hospital, Lynette tells Susan that Julie had confided in her that she might be pregnant. Susan lashes out at Lynette, who reveals that Julie only told her because Lynette is pregnant herself. Lynette contemplates terminating her pregnancy, but Susan persuades her not to. Katherine offers her support to Mike and kisses him, but he pulls away. Bree worries that her affair with Karl may jeopardize her friendship with Susan. As the neighbors become suspicious of Danny, he tells Angie and Nick that he went out drinking the night before, while Ana tells the police that she snuck out to meet Danny the previous night. Gabrielle discovers that Ana lied to the police to cover for Danny, forcing her to confess the truth. Danny is arrested.
114	3	"Never Judge a Lady by Her Lover"	Andrew Doerfer	Bob Daily	October 11, 2009	13.42
Gabrielle and Carlos have a chance encounter with John Rowland, who is now divorced. When Ana takes a hostessing job at John's restaurant, Gabrielle voices her disapproval, and Carlos accuses her of still being attracted to John, but Gabrielle rebuffs Carlos' suspicions. Danny is released from prison due to lack of evidence against him. Susan confronts Danny about Julie and pins him underneath a car he is fixing, prompting Angie to threaten Susan. After evidence of Danny's innocence surfaces, Susan makes amends with Angie. Lynette and Tom tell their children that she is expecting twins. At work, Lynette hides her pregnancy from Carlos as he gives her a major promotion, after he had passed over another employee because she was pregnant. Karl suggests that he and Bree go on a romantic getaway to Las Vegas, but she declines and says they are not in love, upsetting him. At an event, Bree becomes jealous upon seeing Karl with another woman, and eventually reconsiders his invitation.
115	4	"The God-Why-Don't-You-Love-Me Blues"	David Warren	Alexandra Cunningham	October 18, 2009	13.68
Bree becomes concerned when Katherine begins to spy on Mike and Susan, convinced that their marriage is in crisis. At a wedding catered by Bree, Katherine makes a scene when she sees the cake she had designed for her planned wedding with Mike. Bree fires Katherine and urges her to seek counseling. As Lynette's breasts grow during her pregnancy, Carlos and her colleagues assume she has had a breast augmentation. Gabrielle becomes furious when John and Ana grow closer. John, who still has feelings for Gabrielle, kisses her just as Ana walks in. Gabrielle admits her past affair with John to Ana, but insists she has no feelings for him. Ana keeps quiet about the kiss and quits her job. Susan discovers from Andrew that Julie had been seeing a married man before she was attacked. Awakening from her coma, Julie refuses to identify the married man to Susan. Later, Nick enters Julie's hospital room while she is asleep, saying he misses her.
116	5	"Everybody Ought to Have a Maid"	Larry Shaw	Jamie Gorenberg	October 25, 2009	14.18
Following an incident during an unsupervised playdate at her house, Gabrielle gains a reputation as a neglectful mother, which threatens to derail Juanita's birthday party. Karen convinces Lynette to hire Roy as a handyman, but Lynette later fires Roy after he accuses her of emasculating Tom. Bree finds herself at odds with a motel maid who judges her for having an affair with Karl. Julie returns home from the hospital and tells Nick their affair is over. When Julie confides in Danny that she still feels unsafe, he loans his parents' gun to her. Upon learning that Katherine had flirted with Mike, Susan publicly denounces her as a liar. One night, Susan awakens to Julie holding a gun and saying someone is outside. Taking the gun, Susan accidentally shoots and grazes the person lurking outside, who turns out to be Katherine. Since the gun is registered in the Bolens' real name, Angie dissuades Katherine from calling the police by claiming she believes Mike still loves Katherine, while Nick retrieves the gun.
117	6	"Don't Walk on the Grass"	David Grossman	Marco Pennette	November 1, 2009	14.08
Having developed feelings for Karl, Bree decides to end the affair, before he gifts her his grandmother's brooch. Seeing the brooch on Bree, Susan reveals that it belonged to her before she lost it; Bree claims she bought it at an antique store. Karl proposes to Bree, but she insists that he prove he is a changed man. Orson discovers that Bree lied about where she bought the brooch. After Juanita says a swear word during a school play, the principal questions Gabrielle's parenting skills. Angered, Gabrielle pulls Juanita out of the school and is forced to homeschool her daughter, leading to conflict between the two. Lynette berates Tom after learning he is cheating on a midterm exam due to failing the class. Katherine pretends to rekindle her friendship with Susan, but when Susan discovers Katherine's plan to seduce Mike, the two women engage in a physical altercation. As Katherine begins to question Angie's past, Angie convinces Susan that Katherine may have strangled Julie as an act of revenge.
118	7	"Careful the Things You Say"	Bethany Rooney	Peter Lefcourt	November 8, 2009	13.80
Gabrielle exploits her new housekeeper—who has a PhD—by having her tutor Juanita. When Gabrielle confides in Carlos that homeschooling Juanita is affecting their mother–daughter relationship, he agrees to find another solution. As Susan attempts to prove that Katherine attacked Julie, Detective Denise Lapera offers to investigate. However, after Susan realizes that Denise is a former classmate who hated her in high school, a vengeful Denise arrests Susan for failing to report that she had shot Katherine. In order to secure a job catering an anniversary party for an Italian couple, Bree convinces Angie to share her secret family recipes with her, claiming she is cooking for a friend who is a burn victim. Angie discovers Bree's deceit, but they resolve their differences, and Angie agrees to work for Bree. After learning of Julie's past affair with Nick, Lynette and Tom, suspecting that Nick strangled Julie, inform the police about the affair. Angie tells Nick that she has known about his affair for weeks.
119	8	"The Coffee Cup"	Larry Shaw	Dave Flebotte	November 15, 2009	14.72
When Susan and Katherine are both sentenced to community service, Susan is shocked to learn that Katherine and Mike once had sex five times in one day, and sets out to beat Katherine's "record". Gabrielle becomes determined to enroll Juanita into a coveted Catholic school. When Gabrielle accidentally discovers Lynette's pregnancy, Carlos, in order to avoid a lawsuit, forces Lynette to choose between running the company's Miami branch or quitting. To help secure Bree's divorce, Karl instructs her to take pictures of Orson meeting with a fellow ex-convict, serving as proof of him violating his parole. Bree and Karl are having sex in her bedroom when Orson—who has become suspicious of the affair—arrives home unexpectedly from his weekend trip, but Angie covers for Bree. Angie catches a coffee-shop waitress, Emily, behaving flirtatiously toward Nick. While alone at the coffee shop one night, Emily is strangled to death by an unseen assailant.
120	9	"Would I Think of Suicide?"	Ken Whittingham	Jason Ganzel	November 29, 2009	12.78
As Carlos continues to punish Lynette at work, she files a lawsuit against him for workplace harassment, further straining Gabrielle and Lynette's friendship. When Carlos gives Lynette an excessive amount of work to complete in one night, she misses the deadline and he fires her. Susan is incensed when she discovers Bree and Karl's affair, but when Bree confesses that she truly loves Karl, Susan gives them her blessing. Bree executes her blackmail scheme by arranging a meeting between Orson and his former cellmate, Lamar. After being rejected by Julie and witnessing his parents in a heated argument, Danny attempts suicide by overdosing on pills and is hospitalized. In a daze, Danny tells Nurse Mona Clark, a Wisteria Lane resident, that his name is Tyler. As M.J. becomes embroiled in Katherine's schemes to win Mike back, Mike angrily confronts her and declares that he never truly loved her. In desperation, Katherine calls 911 before stabbing herself with a knife that Mike had touched.
121	10	"Boom Crunch"	David Grossman	John Pardee & Joey Murphy	December 6, 2009	14.86
Katherine falsely accuses Mike of stabbing her. Concerned about Katherine's deteriorating mental state, Susan contacts Dylan, who arrives on Wisteria Lane and has Katherine committed to a mental institution. The feud between Gabrielle and Lynette continues to escalate. After manipulating Danny into revealing that his family has been on the run since Angie killed a man 18 years earlier, Mona blackmails the Bolens for money. Bree demands that Orson sign the divorce papers, showing him the pictures of him and Lamar. At Wisteria Lane's annual Christmas festival, Bree is furious to learn that Karl has hired a private plane to fly a marriage proposal over the festival. Upon discovering Bree and Karl's affair, Orson engages in a fistfight with Karl inside Santa's Workshop, which Bree attempts to defuse. As the plane crashes onto the lane, Mona is struck, Lynette saves Celia from being hit, and the plane smashes into the workshop while Bree, Orson, and Karl are still inside.
122	11	"If..."	Larry Shaw	Jamie Gorenberg	January 3, 2010	15.35
In the aftermath of the plane crash, the housewives reflect on what their lives would have been like if they had made different choices. Susan ponders what would have happened to her life if she had stayed married to Karl; she is then notified of his death. Devastated by the news of Karl's death, Bree is sedated and envisions herself married to Karl. Upon awakening, Bree is informed that Orson has become paralyzed. Angie contemplates the consequences of Mona surviving and revealing the Bolens' secrets to the police, but is relieved to learn of Mona's death. Gabrielle wonders if Celia is destined to be a successful actress. The doctor tells Lynette and Tom that one of their unborn twins needs surgery. As Lynette goes into surgery, she imagines life with a disabled son. Tom tells Lynette that the affected baby died, but the other survived. Gabrielle and Lynette rekindle their friendship.
123	12	"You Gotta Get a Gimmick"	David Grossman	Joe Keenan	January 10, 2010	14.03
After inheriting Karl's share of a strip club, Susan learns that Mike is the club's plumber and forbids him from going back there. Mike objects to being told what to do, until Susan performs a striptease onstage to prove her point. Carlos hires Tom to fill in for Lynette while she is pregnant. Lynette is furious when Tom expects her to be a stay-at-home mother after the baby is born, while she struggles to process her grief over the loss of the other twin. Feeling guilty for Orson's paralysis, Bree brings him home so she can look after him. Orson, who still resents Bree for her affair with Karl, decides to seek revenge by exploiting her goodwill. Juanita is accepted to Oakridge School, but when she reveals she was unaware of her Mexican heritage, Gabrielle is forced to examine her own feelings of shame regarding her heritage.
124	13	"How About a Friendly Shrink?"	Lonny Price	Jason Ganzel	January 17, 2010	11.32
Tom begins seeing a therapist, Dr. Graham. Lynette visits Dr. Graham to defend herself from Tom's supposed badmouthing, but eventually agrees to couples therapy. Orson continues to order Bree around at his whim and refuses to be bathed, prompting her to spray him with a garden hose. Bree apologizes after Orson admits he is frustrated by the loss of his independence. When the Oakridge students are placed into learning groups in math class, Susan and Gabrielle compete to determine which of their children—Juanita or M.J.—is in the advanced group. Angie instantly disapproves of Danny's new girlfriend, Ana, who she feels is too fun-loving and not serious enough. Katherine is reluctant to return to Wisteria Lane, fearing she will not be forgiven, but relents when Karen visits her with Bree, Lynette, Gabrielle, and Susan, who are all willing to forgive Katherine.
125	14	"The Glamorous Life"	Bethany Rooney	Dave Flebotte	January 31, 2010	11.44
Susan sells off her share of the strip club and encourages Robin, a stripper with higher aspirations but no skills, to quit her job. After a failed attempt to get Robin an assistant job at Oakridge, Susan convinces Mike to let Robin stay with them temporarily. When Lynette and Tom watch Dr. Graham give a terrible performance in a local play, after she had claimed she had a gift for acting, they lose confidence in her as a therapist and subsequently stop seeing her. Carlos attacks Danny after catching him making out with Ana, but Angie intervenes and warns Carlos to stay away from her son. Gabrielle and Carlos later overhear Nick berating Angie for nearly blowing their cover due to her dispute with a neighbor, Mitzi. Bree is shocked to discover that Orson has decided to commit suicide. After stopping Orson's attempt to drown himself in a swimming pool, Bree tells him she wants to fall in love with him again, and they reconcile.
126	15	"Lovely"	David Warren	David Schladweiler	February 21, 2010	10.92
Robin's arrival on Wisteria Lane gradually begins to affect the lives of several of her new neighbors. After catching Parker spying on Robin while she is showering, Lynette confronts Robin but later apologizes to her. Robin advises Bree to reconnect with Orson by reigniting their sex life. Gabrielle has Robin tell Ana about how she gave up her dreams for a boy in her youth, leading Ana to break up with Danny and leave for New York City to pursue a modeling career. Realizing she has been used, Robin tells Danny the truth, and he secretly chases after Ana. Susan grows jealous when Robin starts giving Mike massages to ease his sore back. To preserve her friendship with Susan, Robin moves out and becomes Katherine's roommate. Robin reveals to Katherine that she is a lesbian, and despite insisting she is not interested in women when Robin suggests she explores the possibility, Katherine is seemingly intrigued by the idea.
127	16	"The Chase"	Larry Shaw	John Pardee & Joey Murphy	February 28, 2010	10.89
Gabrielle is forced to leave the house when Celia contracts chickenpox. Enjoying the single life again, Gabrielle initially tries to prolong her stay with Bob and Lee, but ultimately returns home with a new appreciation for her children. Distracted by her pregnancy, Lynette and Tom forget Penny's birthday. Bree hires Sam Allen, a mysterious man who takes a strong interest in her. Susan pushes Roy into proposing to Karen, who learns that she may have lung cancer. Katherine's therapist suggests she stop living with Robin because she is interfering with her recovery. Later, Katherine abruptly tells Robin to leave because she has feelings for her; Robin agrees to leave, but Katherine then follows her upstairs. Angie discovers that Danny has run off to New York to see Ana. Fearing that a man from their past named Patrick will find Danny, Angie and Nick head to New York to find him.
128	17	"Chromolume No. 7"	Lonny Price	Marco Pennette	March 14, 2010	12.01
Katherine seeks advice from Bob and Lee about her feelings for Robin, while Mike tries to show Susan how manly he is after he begins to feel like he is emasculated. Preston returns from Europe with a girlfriend, Irina, and announces that he has proposed to her, much to Lynette's dismay. After finding a picture of Sam as a toddler with Rex, Bree discovers that Sam is Rex's illegitimate son. Gabrielle joins Angie in New York after discovering that Ana knows she sabotaged her relationship with Danny. In New York, Angie convinces her mother Rose to let Danny stay in Fairview, while Gabrielle has a chance encounter with supermodels Heidi Klum and Paulina Porizkova, only to discover that they despise her because of her past attitude. Returning to Fairview, Angie confesses her past to Gabrielle, revealing that she joined a group of eco-terrorists with Danny's father Patrick, running away with Nick after killing an innocent man in an environmental protest.
129	18	"My Two Young Men"	David Grossman	Bob Daily	March 21, 2010	10.84
Bree invites Sam to a family dinner, but Andrew storms out when Bree gives Rex's old guitar to Sam. Andrew and Orson later team up to expose Sam's true intentions. Susan and Gabrielle go to shameless lengths to top each other's children in a candy bar fundraiser; Gabrielle flirts with construction workers to convince them to buy the candy bars, while Susan has M.J. pretend to be handicapped to sell more bars. Preston announces his intentions to put off college and find a job, despite Lynette's insistence that he is making a mistake marrying Irina. Katherine is unsure about announcing her relationship with Robin to the neighborhood. After being advised by Karen to do what she wants, Katherine decides to travel with Robin to Paris to help define their relationship. Nick is torn over whether to tell Danny the truth about his father. In New York, Rose's neighbor contacts Patrick to inform him of Angie's location.
130	19	"We All Deserve to Die"	Larry Shaw	Josann McGibbon & Sara Parriott	April 18, 2010	10.62
After Mike's truck is repossessed, Susan tries to help his financial woes by paying her friends to clog up their plumbing; Mike catches on and insists he does not want her help. Gabrielle offers to help Bob and Lee in having their child by being their surrogate, but backs out when Bob and Lee do not want her to have an active part in raising their child; Bob and Lee later break up. Bree fires Andrew when he suggests that Sam is manipulating her. Sam is alarmed to hear that Bree eventually plans to take Andrew back in, and he blames Andrew when the food is sabotaged at a dinner Bree is hosting. Patrick strikes a conversation with Danny at the coffee shop where he works. Lynette discovers that Irina is already married and has had several affairs with men whom she stripped of their money, causing Preston to break off the wedding. Banished from the Scavos' home, Irina walks the street and is offered a ride by Danny's friend Eddie. When Irina rejects his romantic advances, Eddie strangles her to death.
131	20	"Epiphany"	David Grossman	Marc Cherry	April 25, 2010	11.29
Flashbacks depict Eddie Orlofsky's life on Wisteria Lane. Mary Alice discovers a four-year-old Eddie home alone and lectures his single mother Barbara about prioritizing her son; Barbara later tells Eddie that he ruined her life. Gabrielle moves to Wisteria Lane and befriends a nine-year-old Eddie, but lets him down gently to make friends her own age. Bree gives dating advice to a teenage Eddie, but asks Barbara to let him down easy when his crush turns out to be Danielle; Barbara crudely mocks Eddie instead. Eddie develops a crush on Susan after bonding with her over his drawings. When Susan is nervous about marrying Mike, Eddie offers to marry her; Susan interprets it as a joke and laughs. Intent on killing Susan, Eddie accidentally strangles Julie. In the present, Lynette is horrified by Barbara's abusive treatment of her son. Barbara finds Eddie's scrapbook and discovers he is the Fairview Strangler; Eddie strangles her to death when she tries to call the police. Lynette then arrives and offers to let Eddie stay with them, to which he tearfully accepts.
132	21	"A Little Night Music"	David Warren	Matt Berry	May 2, 2010	12.12
Gabrielle discovers Carlos' loan to Mike and informs Susan. Before Susan can call Mike, the two women play a prank against their husbands to retaliate. After witnessing Sam argue with a grocery store clerk, Bree investigates and finds out that the clerk is Sam's biological mother, whom he claimed to have died. Bree confronts Sam, who becomes violent and angrily reveals his jealousy of Andrew and Danielle. Bree apologizes to Andrew and reveals that she is now afraid of Sam. The Scavos have welcomed Eddie into their home, but Eddie pins Porter to the floor when he refuses to help Lynette with the laundry. Lynette refers Eddie to a therapist, who wishes to meet with Barbara for a session; Lynette tries to contact Barbara, but discovers that the neighbors have not seen her for days. Patrick runs over Nick and leaves him for dead; Nick survives the attack and insists that Angie send Danny to a hotel. Angie returns home and is confronted by Patrick, who threatens to kill Nick if she runs away.
133	22	"The Ballad of Booth"	Larry Shaw	Bob Daily	May 9, 2010	11.36
In an effort to get rid of Sam, Bree sends police officers to intimidate him. However, Sam reveals that Danielle told him about Andrew running over Juanita Solis, and blackmails Bree into turning over her entire company to him. After meeting with an IRS agent, Susan and Mike ultimately decide to leave Wisteria Lane and rent out their house. Fearing for her life, Angie agrees to help Patrick build a bomb, while Patrick lures Danny back to Wisteria Lane and ties him up to a chair. Gabrielle arrives at the Bolen house with lasagna; Angie discreetly scribbles a note and sticks it into the lasagna before sending it back. While eating the lasagna, Celia spits out the note, which reads "Danny and I held hostage. No cops. Get Nick." The police arrive at the Scavo house to inform them about Irina's death, after which Eddie abruptly moves out. After overhearing that Barbara's body was found, Lynette arrives at Eddie's house to inform him. When she realizes that Eddie is the Fairview Strangler, Eddie locks the door.
134	23	"I Guess This Is Goodbye"	David Grossman	Alexandra Cunningham	May 16, 2010	12.75
Lynette goes into labor while being held hostage at Eddie's house. After Eddie helps deliver the baby, Lynette convinces Eddie to turn himself in, and she allows him to hold the baby while she calls the police. Bree hands over her company to Sam to silence him; Orson is angered by Bree's hypocrisy and leaves her. Gabrielle informs Nick about Angie's note, and they drive back to Wisteria Lane. Patrick plants Angie's bomb inside the house and activates it with a detonator. However, the bomb in the house is a decoy, and Angie reveals that she had planted the actual bomb in the detonator; Patrick is killed in the resulting explosion. Gabrielle offers Angie and Nick money to relocate to Atlanta, as they are still on the run from the FBI, while Danny moves to New York to be closer to Ana. After the women say goodbye to Susan, Bree privately confesses to Gabrielle about Andrew's hit-and-run. As Susan and Mike leave Wisteria Lane, the new occupant of their house is revealed to be Paul Young.

== International ratings ==
Episode number Production number	Title	US (ABC)	UK (CH4 +E4)	IRE (RTÉ 2)	FRA (M6)	NZ (TV2)
112; 6-01	Nice is Different Than Good	13.643m	3.418m	592,000	3.2m	479,100
113; 6-02	Being Alive	14.641m	3.329m	510,000	3.5m	477,080
114; 6-03	Never Judge a Lady By Her Lover	13.423m	2.916m	488,000	3.7m	447,990
115; 6-04	The God-Why-Don't-You-Love-Me Blues	13.677m	2.854m	488,000	3.3m	471,200
116; 6-05	Everybody Ought to Have a Maid	14.183m	2.664m	509,000	3.3m	448,490
117; 6-06	Don't Walk on the Grass	14.078m	2.414m	464,000	3.3m	452,490
118; 6-07	Careful the Things You Say	13.795m	2.652m	434,000	3.4m	413,820
119; 6-08	The Coffee Cup	14.718m	2.659m	485,000	4m	397,830
120; 6-09	Would I Think of Suicide?	12.781m	2.370m	414,000	3.4m	391,220
121; 6-10	Boom Crunch	14.861m	3.028m	441,000	3.7m	411,880
122; 6-11	If...	15.349m	2.750m	440,000	3.7m	419,020
123; 6-12	You Gotta Get a Gimmick	14.025m	2.675m	411,000	3.9m	429,540
124; 6-13	How About a Friendly Shrink?	11.317m	2.654m	414,000	4.1m	375,760
125; 6-14	The Glamorous Life	11.437m	2.66m	463,000	3.7m	375,620
126; 6-15	Lovely	10.924m	2.327m	381,000	3.9m	400,730
127; 6-16	The Chase	10.894m	2.428m	460,000	3.8m	391,340
128; 6-17	Chromolume No. 7	12.013m	2.136m	442,000	3.7m	425,620
129; 6-18	My Two Young Men	10.837m	2.494m	449,000	3.9m	392,270
130; 6-19	We All Deserve to Die	10.622m	2.550m	476,000	4m	444,790
131; 6-20	Epiphany	11.291m	2.340m	440,000	3.8m	524,440
132; 6-21	A Little Night Music	12.118m	2.634m	359,000	4m	464,820
133; 6-22	The Ballad of Booth	11.361m	2.691m	399,000	3.5m	447,060
134; 6-23	I Guess This is Goodbye	12.747m	2.935m	411,000	3.68m	453,320

== Detailed international schedules and ratings ==
=== United States (ABC) ===
Episode number Production number	Title	Original airing	Rating	Share	Rating/share (18–49)	Total viewers (in millions)	Rank per week	Note
112; 6-01	Nice is Different Than Good	September 27, 2009	8.6	13	4.7	13.643	#16	
113; 6-02	Being Alive	October 4, 2009	9.2	14	5.0	14.641	#10	
114; 6-03	Never Judge a Lady By Her Lover	October 11, 2009	8.2	12	4.6	13.423	#13	
115; 6-04	The God-Why-Don't-You-Love-Me Blues	October 18, 2009	8.7	13	4.6	13.677	#12	
116; 6-05	Everybody Ought to Have a Maid	October 25, 2009	9.0	14	4.7	14.183	#10	
117; 6-06	Don't Walk on the Grass	November 1, 2009	8.8	13	5.0	14.078	#12	
118; 6-07	Careful the Things You Say	November 8, 2009	8.6	13	4.4	13.795	#14	
119; 6-08	The Coffee Cup	November 15, 2009	8.9	13	5.0	14.718	#11	
120; 6-09	Would I Think of Suicide?	November 29, 2009	7.9	12	4.4	12.781	#12	
121; 6-10	Boom Crunch	December 6, 2009	9.1	14	4.9	14.861	#2	
122; 6-11	If...	January 3, 2010	9.2	14	5.3	15.349	#3	
123; 6-12	You Gotta Get a Gimmick	January 10, 2010	8.8	13	4.7	14.025	#9	
124; 6-13	How About a Friendly Shrink?	January 17, 2010	7.0	11	3.8	11.317	#20	
125; 6-14	The Glamorous Life	January 31, 2010	6.9	10	3.7	11.437	#12	
126; 6-15	Lovely	February 21, 2010	6.9	10	3.7	10.924	#15	
127; 6-16	The Chase	February 28, 2010	6.8	10	3.7	10.894	#17	
128; 6-17	Chromolume No. 7	March 14, 2010	7.4	12	3.7	12.013	#15	
129; 6-18	My Two Young Men	March 21, 2010	6.9	11	3.5	10.837	#12	
130; 6-19	We All Deserve to Die	April 18, 2010	6.8	11	3.3	10.622	#19	
131; 6-20	Epiphany	April 25, 2010	7.1	11	3.4	11.291	#13	
132; 6-21	A Little Night Music	May 2, 2010	7.6	12	3.8	12.118	#12	
133; 6-22	The Ballad of Booth	May 9, 2010	7.0	11	3.8	11.361	#15	
134; 6-23	I Guess This is Goodbye	May 16, 2010	7.9	13	4.0	12.747	#14	

=== Republic of Ireland (RTÉ 2) ===
- Desperate Housewives airs Tuesdays at 9:55 pm on RTÉ 2 in Ireland.
- All ratings below are supplied from the RTÉ Guide TV guide. The ratings are supplied by TAM Ireland/Nielsen TAM.
- Season 6 averaged 451,000 viewers when the average was calculated after the season finale.

Episode number	Title	Original airing	Airing Time	Viewers	Rank (RTÉ2 only)
112 (6-01)	Nice is Different Than Good	January 5, 2010	9:55 pm	592,000	#1
113 (6-02)	Being Alive	January 12, 2010	9:55 pm	510,000	#1
114 (6-03)	Never Judge a Lady By Her Lover	January 19, 2010	9:55 pm	488,000	#1
115 (6-04)	The God-Why-Don't-You-Love-Me Blues	January 26, 2010	9:55 pm	488,000	#1
116 (6-05)	Everybody Ought to Have a Maid	February 2, 2010	9:55 pm	509,000	#1
117 (6-06)	Don't Walk on the Grass	February 9, 2010	9:55 pm	464,000	#2
118 (6-07)	Careful the Things You Say	February 16, 2010	9:55 pm	434,000	#1
119 (6-08)	The Coffee Cup	February 23, 2010	9:55 pm	485,000	#2
120 (6-09)	Would I Think of Suicide?	March 2, 2010	10:05 pm	414,000	#2
121 (6-10)	Boom Crunch	March 9, 2010	9:55 pm	441,000	#2
122 (6-11)	If...	March 16, 2010	9:55 pm	440,000	#2
123 (6-12)	You Gotta Get a Gimmick	March 23, 2010	9:55 pm	411,000	#1
124 (6-13)	How About a Friendly Shrink?	March 30, 2010	9:55 pm	414,000	#1
125 (6-14)	The Glamorous Life	April 6, 2010	9:55 pm	463,000	#1
126 (6-15)	Lovely	April 13, 2010	9:55 pm	381,000	#1
127 (6-16)	The Chase	April 20, 2010	9:55 pm	460,000	#1
128 (6-17)	Chromolume No. 7	April 27, 2010	9:55 pm	442,000	#1
129 (6-18)	My Two Young Men	May 4, 2010	9:55 pm	449,000	#1
130 (6-19)	We All Deserve to Die	May 11, 2010	9:55 pm	476,000	#1
131 (6-20)	Epiphany	May 18, 2010	9:55 pm	440,000	#1
132 (6-21)	A Little Night Music	May 25, 2010	9:55 pm	359,000	#3
133 (6-22)	The Ballad of Booth	June 1, 2010	9:55 pm	399,000	#2
134 (6-23)	I Guess This is Goodbye	June 8, 2010	9:55 pm	411,000	#3

=== India (Star World) ===
Episode number Production number	Title	Original airing	Airing Time
112; 6-01	Nice is Different Than Good	February 26, 2010	10:00 pm
113; 6-02	Being Alive	February 27, 2010	10:00 pm
114; 6-03	Never Judge a Lady By Her Lover	February 28, 2010	10:00 pm
115; 6-04	The God-Why-Don't-You-Love-Me Blues	March 5, 2010	10:00 pm
116; 6-05	Everybody Ought to Have a Maid	March 6, 2010	10:00 pm
117; 6-06	Don't Walk on the Grass	March 7, 2010	10:00 pm
118; 6-07	Careful the Things You Say	March 12, 2010	10:00 pm
119; 6-08	The Coffee Cup	March 13, 2010	10:00 pm
120; 6-09	Would I Think of Suicide?	March 14, 2010	10:00 pm
121; 6-10	Boom Crunch	March 19, 2010	10:00 pm
122; 6-11	If...	March 19, 2010	11:00 pm
123; 6-12	You Gotta Get a Gimmick	March 20, 2010	10:00 pm
124; 6-13	How About a Friendly Shrink?	March 26, 2010	10:00 pm
125; 6-14	The Glamorous Life	March 27, 2010	10:00 pm
126; 6-15	Lovely	March 28, 2010	10:00 pm
127; 6-16	The Chase	April 4, 2010	10:00 pm
128; 6-17	Chromolume No. 7	April 11, 2010	10:00 pm
129; 6-18	My Two Young Men	April 18, 2010	10:00 pm
130; 6-19	We All Deserve to Die	April 25, 2010	10:00 pm
131; 6-20	Epiphany	May 2, 2010	10:00 pm
132; 6-21	A Little Night Music	May 9, 2010	10:00 pm
133; 6-22	The Ballad of Booth	May 16, 2010	10:00 pm
134; 6-23	I Guess This is Goodbye	May 23, 2010	10:00 pm

=== United Kingdom (Channel 4) ===
Episode number	Title	Original airing on Channel 4	Time of airing on Channel 4	Original airing on E4	Time of airing on E4	Position in Channel 4's ratings^{a}	Position in E4's ratings^{b}	Total viewers
112	Nice is Different Than Good	January 27, 2010	10:00 pm – 11:00 pm	January 31, 2010	10:00 pm – 11:00 pm	3.090m - #10	328,000 - #11	3.418m
113	Being Alive	February 3, 2010	10:00 pm – 11:00 pm	January 31, 2010	10:00 pm – 11:00 pm	2.482m - #5	874,000 - #7	3.329m
114	Never Judge a Lady By Her Lover	February 10, 2010	10:00 pm – 11:00 pm	February 7, 2010	10:00 pm – 11:00 pm	2.27m - #14	646,000 - #7	2.916m
115	The God-Why-Don't-You-Love-Me Blues	February 17, 2010	10:00 pm – 11:00 pm	February 14, 2010	10:00 pm – 11:00 pm	2.34m - #9	514,000 - #11	2.854m
116	Everybody Ought to Have a Maid	February 24, 2010	10:00 pm – 11:00 pm	February 21, 2010	10:00 pm – 11:00 pm	2.16 - #14	504,000 - #9	2.664m
117	Don't Walk on the Grass	March 3, 2010	10:00 pm – 11:00 pm	February 28, 2010	10:00 pm – 11:00 pm	1.70 - #31	714,000 - #5	2.414m
118	Careful the Things You Say	March 10, 2010	10:00 pm – 11:00 pm	March 7, 2010	10:00 pm – 11:00 pm	1.99 - #24	662,000 - #6	2.652m
119	The Coffee Cup	March 17, 2010	10:00 pm – 11:00 pm	March 14, 2010	10:00 pm – 11:00 pm	1.92 - #22	739,000 - #5	2.659m
120	Would I Think of Suicide?	March 24, 2010	10:00 pm – 11:00 pm	March 21, 2010	10:00 pm – 11:00 pm	1.69 - #31	680,000 - #5	2.370m
121	Boom Crunch	March 31, 2010	10:00 pm – 11:00 pm	March 28, 2010	10:00 pm – 11:00 pm	2.29 - #6	738,000 - #3	3.028m
122	If...	April 14, 2010	10:00 pm – 11:00 pm	April 11, 2010	10:00 pm – 11:00 pm	1.93 - #12	820,000 - #2	2.750m
123	You Gotta Get a Gimmick	April 21, 2010	10:00 pm – 11:00 pm	April 18, 2010	10:00 pm – 11:00 pm	1.90 - #13	775,000 - #2	2.675m
124	How About a Friendly Shrink?	April 28, 2010	10:00 pm – 11:00 pm	April 25, 2010	10:00 pm – 11:00 pm	1.755 - #8	899,000 - #2	2.654m
125	The Glamorous Life	May 5, 2010	10:00 pm – 11:00 pm	May 2, 2010	10:00 pm – 11:00 pm	1.86 - #11	800,000 - #3	2.66m
126	Lovely	May 12, 2010	10:00 pm – 11:00 pm	May 9, 2010	10:00 pm – 11:00 pm	1.48 - #20	847,000 - #3	2.327m
127	The Chase	May 19, 2010	10:00 pm – 11:00 pm	May 16, 2010	10:00 pm – 11:00 pm	1.60 - #14	828,000 - #2	2.428m
128	Chromolume No. 7	May 26, 2010	9:00 pm – 10:00 pm	May 23, 2010	10:00 pm – 11:00 pm	1.39 - #30	846,000 - #2	2.136m
129	My Two Young Men	June 2, 2010	10:00 pm – 11:00 pm	May 30, 2010	10:00 pm – 11:00 pm	1.65 - #3	840,000 - #2	2.494m
130	We All Deserve to Die	June 9, 2010	10:35 pm – 11:35 pm	June 6, 2010	10:00 pm – 11:00 pm	1.91 - #13	640,000 - #11	2.550m
131	Epiphany	June 16, 2010	10:00 pm – 11:00 pm	June 13, 2010	10:00 pm – 11:00 pm	1.73 - #15	640,000 - #11	2.340m
132	A Little Night Music	June 23, 2010	10:00 pm – 11:00 pm	June 20, 2010	10:00 pm – 11:00 pm	1.71 - #16	924,000 - #2	2.634m
133	The Ballad of Booth	June 30, 2010	10:00 pm – 11:00 pm	June 27, 2010	10:00 pm – 11:00 pm	1.85 - #14	841,000 - #2	2.691m
134	I Guess This is Goodbye	July 7, 2010	10:00 pm – 11:00 pm	July 4, 2010	10:00 pm – 11:00 pm	1.85 - #14	1.085m - #1	2.935m

=== New Zealand (TV2) ===
All sourced from: Throng Ratings. The season averaged 431,975 viewers.

Episode number	Title	Original airing	Timeslot	Viewers	Top 50 Ranking	Scripted Show Ranking
112	Nice Is Different Than Good	February 15, 2010	8:35 pm – 9:30 pm	479,100	12	3
113	Being Alive	February 22, 2010	8:30 pm – 9:30 pm	477,080	8	1
114	Never Judge a Lady By Her Lover	March 1, 2010	8:30 pm – 9:30 pm	447,990	9	1
115	The God-Why-Don't-You-Love-Me Blues	March 8, 2010	8:30 pm – 9:30 pm	471,200	14	4
116	Everybody Ought to Have a Maid	March 15, 2010	8:30 pm – 9:30 pm	448,490	15	5
117	Don't Walk on the Grass	March 22, 2010	8:30 pm – 9:30 pm	452,490	12	4
118	Careful the Things You Say	March 29, 2010	8:30 pm – 9:30 pm	413,820	13	5
119	The Coffee Cup	April 12, 2010	8:30 pm – 9:30 pm	397,830	23	8
120	Would I Think of Suicide?	April 19, 2010	8:30 pm – 9:30 pm	391,220	25	9
121	Boom Crunch	April 26, 2010	8:30 pm – 9:30 pm	411,880	21	8
122	If...	May 3, 2010	8:30 pm – 9:30 pm	419,020	21	9
123	You Gotta Get a Gimmick	May 10, 2010	8:30 pm – 9:30 pm	429,540	19	8
124	How About a Friendly Shrink?	May 17, 2010	8:30 pm – 9:30 pm	375,760	28	10
125	The Glamorous Life	May 24, 2010	8:30 pm – 9:30 pm	375,620	25	6
126	Lovely	May 31, 2010	8:30 pm – 9:30 pm	400,730	28	11
127	The Chase	June 7, 2010	8:30 pm – 9:30 pm	391,340	23	11
128	Chromolume No. 7	June 14, 2010	8:30 pm – 9:30 pm	425,620	25	10
129	My Two Young Men	June 21, 2010	8:30 pm – 9:30 pm	392,270	24	7
130	We All Deserve to Die	June 28, 2010	8:30 pm – 9:30 pm	444,790	21	8
131	Epiphany	July 5, 2010	8:30 pm – 9:30 pm	524,440	18	4
132	A Little Night Music	July 12, 2010	8:30 pm – 9:30 pm	464,820	19	6
133	The Ballad of Booth	July 19, 2010	8:30 pm – 9:30 pm	447,060	19	5
134	I Guess This Is Goodbye	July 26, 2010	8:30 pm – 9:30 pm	453,320/769,090*	21	6

- For episode 134, original airing only / original including prime-time repeat special before beginning of new season on January 7, 2011.

== DVD release ==
Desperate Housewives: The Complete Sixth Season (The All Mighty Edition)
Set details	Special features	
23 Episodes; 5-Disc Set (Region 1); 6-Disc Set (Region 2 & 4); English (Dolby Digital 5.1 Surround); English SDH, Spanish and French subtitles; Audio Commentaries; Runtime: 987 minutes	Bloopers; Deleted Scenes; "Dirty Little Secret" - Full unaired storyline from episode 16 "The Chase"; Cherry-Picked: Creator Marc Cherry's Favourite Scenes; Audio commentaries by Creator Marc Cherry on his favorite scenes; Miss Piggy Gets Desperate - One of America's favorite divas barges onto Wisteria Lane for One-On-One interviews with the hottest cast on TV; Master Class - Learn what it takes to be an actor on one of TV's most popular and acclaimed shows as the talented cast reveal their acting process and how they developed their craft; Desperate Housewives: Starter Kit - Seasons 1-5 recap	
DVD release dates
Region 1	Region 2	Region 4
September 21, 2010	October 4, 2010	October 2010
