= Scavo =

Scavo may refer to:

- Scavo Family, of the American comedy-drama series Desperate Housewives
  - Kayla Scavo (née Huntington), daughter of Tom and Lynette
  - Lynette Scavo (née Lindquist) and Tom Scavo, a couple of central characters
