= Karen McCluskey =

Fictional character on Desperate Housewives

- Kathryn Joosten as Karen McCluskey
- Portrayed by: Kathryn Joosten
- Duration: 2005–2012
- First appearance: "Love Is in the Air"; 1x14, February 13, 2005
- Last appearance: "Finishing the Hat"; 8x23, May 13, 2012
- Created by: Marc Cherry
In-universe information
- Other names: Karen Simonds (maiden name)
- Occupation: Former; Babysitter; Housewife
- Siblings: Roberta Simonds (sister); Gale (sister); Mr McCluskey (brother-in-law)
- Spouse: Gilbert McClusky (m. 1963; died 1997) Roy Bender (m. 2015)
- Children: Unnamed Son (deceased)

Karen McCluskey (née Simonds) is a fictional character from the ABC television series Desperate Housewives. The role was played by Kathryn Joosten, who won the Primetime Emmy Award twice for Outstanding Guest Actress in a Comedy Series in 2005 and 2008. In the series finale, Karen succumbs to cancer. This was agreed upon between Marc Cherry and Joosten, who was herself suffering from cancer, and died 20 days after the series finale was broadcast.

== Storylines ==
=== Backstory ===
Karen Simonds was born in 1943. She has two sisters: Gale and Roberta (Lily Tomlin). She worked as a model of corsets for Sears Roebuck through college.

In 1963 she became the second wife of Gilbert McCluskey (John Harnagel) and they moved into Fairview, 4358 Wisteria Lane in 1982. They had a child who died when he was 12 years old, for an unknown reason.

=== Season 1 ===
Karen McCluskey becomes the neighborhood nemesis of Lynette Scavo, until Lynette helps her when she collapses, leading them to become friends.

=== Season 2 ===
On one occasion, Karen accidentally tasers Lynette's co-worker Stu when she believes he was trying to abduct Lynette's kids. She is also one of the first to become aware of Danielle Van de Kamp's relationship with Matthew Applewhite. Later, she finds Bree passed out on the front lawn after drinking heavily. She subsequently alerts Lynette that Bree had been drinking while babysitting her kids. Afterwards, she frequently babysits the Scavo kids and eventually supports Lynette's decision to follow Tom to Atlantic City when she suspects infidelity.

=== Season 3 ===
Karen becomes closer to her neighbors and is often seen gathering with Lynette Scavo, Gabrielle Solis and Susan Mayer.

After Karen breaks her arm and is in the hospital, first Parker Scavo, then Ida Greenberg discover the dead body of Gilbert, her husband, in her freezer. Ida goes to the police, and Karen is briefly jailed for improper disposal of a body. Karen becomes the subject of rumormongering as a result. While enduring harassment from her neighbors, Parker continues to defend her and tells Karen to just tell the truth to stop the rumors. After some time, Karen decides to come clean to the neighborhood and explains that after her husband's death, she realized Gilbert had neglected to update his pension files, accidentally leaving all of his assets to his first wife. Karen kept his body in a freezer in her basement for the next 10 years so she could continue cashing his pension checks. The neighborhood accepts her again, and Lynette hires her back as their babysitter.

=== Season 4 ===
When a tornado hits Wisteria Lane, Karen reluctantly invites the Scavo's to take shelter in her house, along with herself, Ida and Ida's cat Toby. Karen refuses to evict Toby when Lynette argues that Tom is allergic to cats, and she catches Lynette trying to smuggle Toby from the basement. During the argument, the door blows open and Toby escapes. As Karen tries to get Toby back into her house, Lynette catches her. They try to get back into the house, but when things block their way, they take refuge in Lynette's bathtub. After the tornado passes, they step outside, only to find Mrs. McCluskey's house in ruins. Although Tom and the Scavo kids miraculously survive, Ida is killed. Toby also survives and is adopted by Karen.

As Lynette and Karen pack Ida's belongings, they think of spreading the ashes at a baseball stadium where Ida used to play, but Ida's niece and nephew want to take the urn back to Omaha, Nebraska. Karen and Lynette then switch Ida's ashes for dust from a vacuum cleaner, and later break into the baseball stadium and spread Ida's ashes around the field.

=== Season 5 ===
After the five-year leap for the fifth season, when Edie returns to Fairview with her new husband, Dave Williams (Neal McDonough), Karen welcomes her back and teases her like they used to do. When Edie gets upset, Dave asks Karen to stop, but she refuses. As retaliation, Dave abducts her cat Toby and refuses to return him until she apologizes to Edie. Karen's suspicions of Dave grow, and she begins to investigate him.

After Dave breaks into Karen's house and moves things around in order to feign her dementia, she tries to attack him with a bat at her 70th birthday party. She is stopped and taken away in an ambulance. In the hospital, Karen apologizes to Edie, claiming her pills had made her attack Dave. However, she asks her sister Roberta to come to town, and they continue to investigate him.

Later, after Edie dies in a car accident, Karen, along with Susan, Gabrielle, Bree and Lynette, are asked by Dave to take her ashes to her son Travers. Travers declines keeping the ashes, leaving Karen to figure out what to do with the ashes. She decides to spread Edie's ashes through the neighborhood, with the help of the other housewives.

=== Season 6 ===
After Karen watches Julie Mayer fight with Danny Bolen, Julie is attacked by an unknown assailant and ends up in a coma. Karen is initially hesitant to tell the police about the altercation between Julie and Danny. Her boyfriend, Roy Bender, convinces her to go through with it, rationalizing that she doesn't have to do it alone, and using this as an opportunity to confess his love for her. Karen later watches as Danny is brought in for questioning.

Later, Karen visits Katherine at the mental hospital she is staying at, to encourage her to come back to Wisteria Lane. She later brings the housewives with her to convince her to come back.

After Karen becomes engaged to Roy, she learns she has lung cancer. However, two episodes later in "My Two Young Men" we learn that Karen has already beaten cancer, and Roy throws a party for her, which all the neighbors of Wisteria Lane attend.

=== Season 7 ===
Karen alerts the women of Paul Young's return in the first episode "Remember Paul?", and she later tells Paul's wife Beth about Martha Huber and that everybody believed Paul had killed her. Roy returns in "A Humiliating Business" where it is revealed that he and Karen have now married. She later then lets Porter and Preston live at her house when Lynette tells them to find a place of their own, however their time is short lived as Karen kicks them out after they have a house party.

After her prison release Felicia Tilman moves next door to Karen, and they talk and reveal that Karen witnessed Felicia faking her death and kept her secret.

=== Season 8 ===
Karen is once again diagnosed with terminal lung cancer. In the series finale, Karen is preparing to head to a hospice, but the women of the Lane insist on taking care of her themselves. After she overhears Gabrielle and Carlos talking about Carlos killing Gabby's stepfather, Karen goes on the stand at Bree's murder trial and falsely confesses to killing Alejandro herself, using details she had overheard to convince the jury. While doubtful of Karen's story, the district attorney throws the case out, and no charges are pressed against Karen due to her age and illness.

Karen dies at home, listening to the song "Wonderful! Wonderful!" sung by Johnny Mathis. Then her spirit is seen joining those who have died over the years on Wisteria Lane. She is seen in the final scene of the show reunited with her son.

== Behind the scenes ==
- Kathryn Joosten mentioned on the talk show The View and subsequent interviews that Marc Cherry promised her not to kill off her character. Joosten explained that Marc Cherry felt badly about all her previous characters being killed off. In a subsequent interview Kathryn said, "Marc (Cherry) did not vow to not kill Karen because she was 'loved'. He and I made that agreement when I came on the show because I'd just been killed off on a bunch of shows and I didn't want that to happen again." Joosten reported that Cherry came to her and asked her if she minded if he broke his promise and change her fate for the last episode of the series. She did not, but she mentioned to him that she wanted her opinion considered on the way it would be done. Her character, Karen, was eventually killed off but lasted until the series final episode "Finishing the Hat."
- After frequently appearing as a guest star for the first five seasons, Kathryn Joosten was promoted at the start of Season 6, listed as "also-starring", but still is only credited for the episodes that she appears in. Due to a relapse of cancer, Joosten was absent for several episodes during the first half of the sixth season. Kathryn Joosten was promoted yet again, and starting with Season 7 is credited as "starring", but still only in the episodes she appears. For the eighth and final season, Joosten has returned to her previous status as "also-starring".
- Kathryn Joosten was a two-time lung cancer survivor and was the national spokesperson for the Lung Cancer Profiles campaign on behalf of Pfizer.
- Kathryn Joosten herself died of lung cancer just 20 days after the final episode of Desperate Housewives was broadcast. Her character died of the same disease.
- Kathryn Joosten won the Primetime Emmy Award for Outstanding Guest Actress in a Comedy Series in 2005 and 2008, and received another nomination in 2010. In 2012, Joosten received her first Primetime Emmy Award for Outstanding Supporting Actress in a Comedy Series nomination, which was also her last Emmy nomination before she died.
