= Katherine Mayfair =

Fictional character on Desperate Housewives

- Desperate Housewives character
- Dana Delany as Katherine Mayfair
- Portrayed by: Dana Delany
- Duration: 2007–2010, 2012
- First appearance: "Now You Know"; 4x01, September 30, 2007
- Last appearance: "Finishing the Hat"; 8x23, May 13, 2012
- Created by: Marc Cherry
In-universe information
- Other names: Katherine Davis (first married name); Kathy (nickname by Wayne)
- Occupation: Owner of French Pastry Company; Former; President of the Homeowners Association; Caterer; Housewife
- Husband: Wayne Davis (m. 1989; div. 1995) Adam Mayfair (m. 1998; div. 2007)
- Daughters: Dylan Davis (deceased)
- Adoptive daughters: Dylan Mayfair
- Grandchildren: Unnamed grandchild (via Dylan with Bradley)
- Uncles: Mr Simms (deceased)
- Aunts: Lillian Simms (deceased)
- First cousins: Mr Simms
- Other relatives: Bradley (son-in-law)

Katherine Irma Mayfair is a fictional character created by Marc Cherry for the ABC television series Desperate Housewives. The character was portrayed by Dana Delany and first appeared in the series' fourth season premiere on September 30, 2007, as the focus of the yearly mystery.

Katherine is generally characterized by her cold demeanor and impressive domestic skills. Though initially a homemaker, Katherine started a catering business with neighbor Bree Van de Kamp (Marcia Cross), with whom she shares "a heated rivalry." She has been married twice, to Wayne Davis (Gary Cole) and Adam Mayfair (Nathan Fillion), but both relationships ended in divorce. Katherine has had two children; Dylan Davis (Hailee Denham), her daughter who died as a young child, and Dylan Mayfair (Lyndsy Fonseca), her adoptive daughter. The character was later paired with Mike Delfino (James Denton) in the fifth season, which later ended when he returned to and remarried Susan Mayer (Teri Hatcher), leading to Katherine's nervous breakdown in the sixth season. Later that season saw Katherine written into the series' first lesbian relationship with Robin Gallagher (Julie Benz). Delany left the series soon thereafter, when the character relocated to Paris indefinitely with Robin. Delany returned for a guest appearance during the series finale of Desperate Housewives in 2012.

Delany's portrayal received praise from critics and audiences, with many critics attributing the improved quality of the series' fourth season to Delany's performance. The actress was a critics' favorite for a Primetime Emmy Award nomination for Outstanding Supporting Actress in a Comedy Series in 2008.

== Development and casting ==
Delany auditioned for the series' pilot episode in 2004 for the role of Bree Van de Kamp. Creator Marc Cherry thought she delivered "a fantastic audition." Delany was offered the role but rejected it three times. Delany has since insisted that she was not ready to do another television series at the time and that the character of Bree was too similar to her character on Pasadena. The role eventually went to Marcia Cross, Cherry's second choice. Delany reportedly regretted not accepting the part.

I've never ever been in this for the money. I just like to do what challenges me. Thankfully, Marc [Cherry] circled back. That's unusual in Hollywood. Usually when you say "no," they hold it against you for the rest of your career. I've experienced that. [Cherry] said I was sly, and that I got the slyness of the show.

— Dana Delany

When Cherry was developing Katherine, a character with "a lot of Alpha female qualities and some slyness and darkness," he offered Delany the role. She accepted the role and remained on the series until the end of the sixth season. Following her multi-episode guest role on another ABC series, Castle, network executives offered Delany the lead in a new pilot for the 2010-2011 television season. Delany filmed the pilot for Body of Proof in April 2010; her absence in Desperate Housewives was explained by having Katherine and her girlfriend, Robin Gallagher (Julie Benz), leave town indefinitely. In May, ABC picked up Body of Proof for thirteen episodes; thus, Delany did not return for the seventh season of Desperate Housewives as a series regular. Delany admitted that her exit from the series was quick, but insisted that she may return to the series at some point, regardless of whether or not her new series is successful. She returned during the series finale in 2012.

== Personality ==
When Katherine was introduced to the series, many critics noted that she was very similar to Bree Hodge (Marcia Cross), in that both prided themselves on their domestic skills. Cherry noted that Katherine "was clearly different" before her arrival in the fourth season, which Susan confirms when she claims Katherine is "not as fun as she used to be." Her cold exterior is noted by many characters, including Gabrielle Solis (Eva Longoria Parker), who remarks that Katherine is "smug and 'holier than thou'" and is "getting a reputation around [the neighbourhood] for having a stick up [her] ass!" Though Katherine immediately conflicts with the other women on the street, most notably Bree, she eventually develops close friendships with her neighbours. Nevertheless, her rivalry with Bree continues but as a natural part of their sisterly relationship. In the sixth season, however, Katherine "[morphs] into the person the housewives have to hate" in the absence of Edie Britt (Nicollette Sheridan).

Katherine appears to be dependent on a romantic partner. Her first husband, Wayne, was abusive but she eventually left him and married Adam Mayfair. When he leaves, she tries convincing him to come home, saying that she is "lonely," despite having discovered that he had an affair. Later, in the fifth season, Katherine contemplates leaving Fairview because she is single, later revisiting the option in an attempt to force Mike to realize he loves her. She also resorts to trickery in order to ensure that Mike does not end their engagement. When Mike leaves Katherine for Susan, she suffers a complete nervous breakdown. When she becomes romantically involved with a woman, she puts her life in Fairview on hold indefinitely while trying to evaluate everything during an extended vacation in Paris.

== History ==
=== Past ===
Katherine was born on September 8, 1963, and married to abusive police officer Wayne Davis (Gary Cole). Together, they had a daughter named Dylan (Hailee Denham). Wayne became increasingly violent, forcing Katherine to flee with Dylan, and seek refuge with her aunt, Lillian Simms (Ellen Geer) on Wisteria Lane. While living there, Katherine befriended her neighbors, Mary Alice Young and Susan Mayer. One year later, she discovers that Wayne had found them after he dropped off a doll for Dylan, which Katherine takes away and puts on a dresser. That night, she discovers Dylan had tried to retrieve her doll and died when the dresser fell over and crushed her. Fearing Wayne’s wrath, Katherine and Lillian bury Dylan in nearby woods, and she leaves Wisteria Lane, adopting a girl very similar to Dylan from a Romanian orphanage.

Katherine moved to Chicago to raise her new daughter, Dylan (Lyndsy Fonseca). Later Katherine married gynecologist Adam Mayfair (Nathan Fillion). She lied to Adam that Wayne had killed her biological daughter, so he agreed to keep her secret and protect them. After a sexual harassment lawsuit involving her husband, the Mayfairs move back to Wisteria Lane to care for Lillian, now terminally ill.

=== Season 4 ===
Twelve years after leaving Wisteria Lane, Katherine, Adam and Dylan move into Lillian's house. Susan introduces Katherine to Bree, Lynette and Gabrielle. Katherine immediately clashes with each of them, particularly Bree. Meanwhile, Dylan doesn't remember living on Wisteria Lane. Katherine's mysterious exterior and Dylan’s lack of memories raise the suspicions of their neighbors. Dylan questions Katherine about her birth father but Katherine only says that he is too dangerous to let back into their lives.

Lillian writes a detailed account of the original Dylan’s death in a note addressed to the current Dylan but dies before she can give it to her. Sylvia Greene (Melora Walters), the woman who accused Adam of sexual harassment in Chicago, visits him, and Adam is forced to admit to an affair with her. After Katherine kicks Adam out of the house, he finds Lillian's note while packing. He leaves after confronting Katherine, and she throws the note in the fire. However, Dylan salvages a few pieces and deduces that Katherine killed Wayne.

Meanwhile, Wayne finds out about Dylan when he sees a photograph of her. He tracks her down and the two start meeting. Hoping to drive Wayne away, Katherine tells him that Dylan is not his daughter, something Wayne confirms. Adam learns that Wayne has located Katherine and Dylan and offers to help them escape, but Wayne kidnaps Adam. Fearing Wayne has killed Adam, Katherine begs Dylan to leave, Dylan demands the entire truth. Katherine tells her, prompting Dylan to walk out. Later, Wayne corners Katherine and takes her hostage. Before he can shoot her, Adam arrives. Knowing Wayne will always track her, Katherine shoots him dead. Bree, Susan, Lynette, and Gabrielle tell the police that her actions were in self-defense and Katherine is finally integrated into their social group. Dylan returns and reunites with her mother.

==== Five-year jump ====
Bree and Katherine open up a catering company, where Katherine is the head chef. briefly moves in with Bree, a recovering alcoholic who relapses when her husband, Orson Hodge (Kyle MacLachlan), leaves for jail. Katherine's rivalry with Bree continues despite their shared business.

=== Season 5 ===
Katherine is unhappy when she realizes that Bree has used her recipes in her cookbook and leaves her to run the business while she publicizes it. Her resentment deepens when Bree hires Orson as an employee. Meanwhile, Katherine secretly begins dating Mike Delfino (James Denton), Susan's ex-husband. When Susan finds out about the relationship, she feels betrayed but eventually gives them her blessing.

Katherine moves in with Mike, and Susan and Mike's son, M.J. (Mason Vale Cotton). Susan tells Mike and Katherine that she's marrying Jackson but is horrified to learn that Mike will no longer have to pay her alimony. Katherine deceives Susan by letting her think Mike will pay alimony regardless but doesn't tell him the marriage is a green card marriage, afraid that Mike would leave her for Susan. When Susan wants to thank Mike herself, Katherine admits to the lie. Katherine and Mike elope to Las Vegas, but Mike leaves Katherine at the airport when he learns that their neighbor, Dave Williams (Neal McDonough), plans to kill M.J. in revenge.

=== Season 6 ===
In the sixth season premiere, Mike breaks up with Katherine and decides to re-marry Susan. Katherine does not take this very well. Katherine eventually crashes the wedding and demands Susan publicly apologize, but Katherine's remains bitter. When Julie is attacked, Katherine visits Mike while Susan is away at the hospital and kisses him. Katherine then tells Orson that Mike made a pass at her, hoping this will get back to Susan. Bree becomes concerned when she sees Katherine spying through Susan and Mike's windows. After Katherine throws a fit over Bree using one of her cake designs at a wedding they are catering, Bree fires her and advises her to seek professional help. Furious, Katherine keys Bree's car.

Katherine's rivalry with Susan intensifies as she continues pursuing Mike. At a neighborhood watch meeting, Susan publicly threatens Katherine to leave her and Mike alone. Later, Susan accidentally shoots Katherine in the shoulder, mistaking her for the strangler when Katherine was once again spying through her windows. Later, Mike hears that Katherine has told M.J. that Susan is a bad mother, he coldly tells her off and warns her to stay away from M.J. When he leaves, Katherine stabs herself in the stomach with a knife that has Mike's fingerprints on it. Katherine frames Mike and he is temporarily sent to jail while she is in the hospital. Susan worries that Katherine has suffered a nervous breakdown and asks Dylan to visit and have her mother committed for psychiatric observation. She then learns that Katherine has been telling Dylan that she, not Susan, was married to Mike. When Katherine realizes she's been caught, she has a complete breakdown and is institutionalized.

Several months later, when Katherine returns to Wisteria Lane, she develops a friendship with Robin Gallagher (Julie Benz), who moves in with her. Katherine is surprised to learn that Robin is a lesbian and is confused when she develops feelings for her. Soon, the two become sexually involved. When their relationship is made public, Katherine and Robin decide to take a vacation in Paris while they work on defining their relationship.

=== Season 8 ===
Katherine returns to the series in the final episode "Finishing the Hat". Katherine has made a small fortune as the owner of a frozen food company in France. She returns to Wisteria Lane to offer Lynette Scavo a job as the head of her United States expansion. It is revealed she and Robin broke up three months after arriving in Paris as Katherine decided she would rather focus on her professional life.

== Reception ==
=== Critical ===
Katherine's arrival to the series in the fourth season received positive reviews. Robert Bianco of USA Today praised Delany's portrayal of the character, noting that the season was "shaping up to be the best since the first" due to Delany's performance. Other critics agreed that Delany's performance helped the series return to the quality of its first season. Tim Stack of Entertainment Weekly confessed that while he is not a fan of Delany's acting, she is "perfect for this role and looks to be a choice adversary for Bree." He also praised the set-up for their mystery storyline. Matt Roush of TV Guide complimented the addition of Katherine, writing "while she's obviously harboring a dark secret, at least there's no one trapped in the basement," referencing the Betty Applewhite (Alfre Woodard) storyline from the second season.

=== Awards ===
Following the 2007-2008 television season, Delany was a promising contender for an Emmy Award in the Outstanding Supporting Actress in a Comedy Series category, though she did not receive a nomination. In 2009, Delany received a Prism Award for Best Performance in a Comedy Series.
