= Maiara Walsh =

US actress and singer (born 1988)

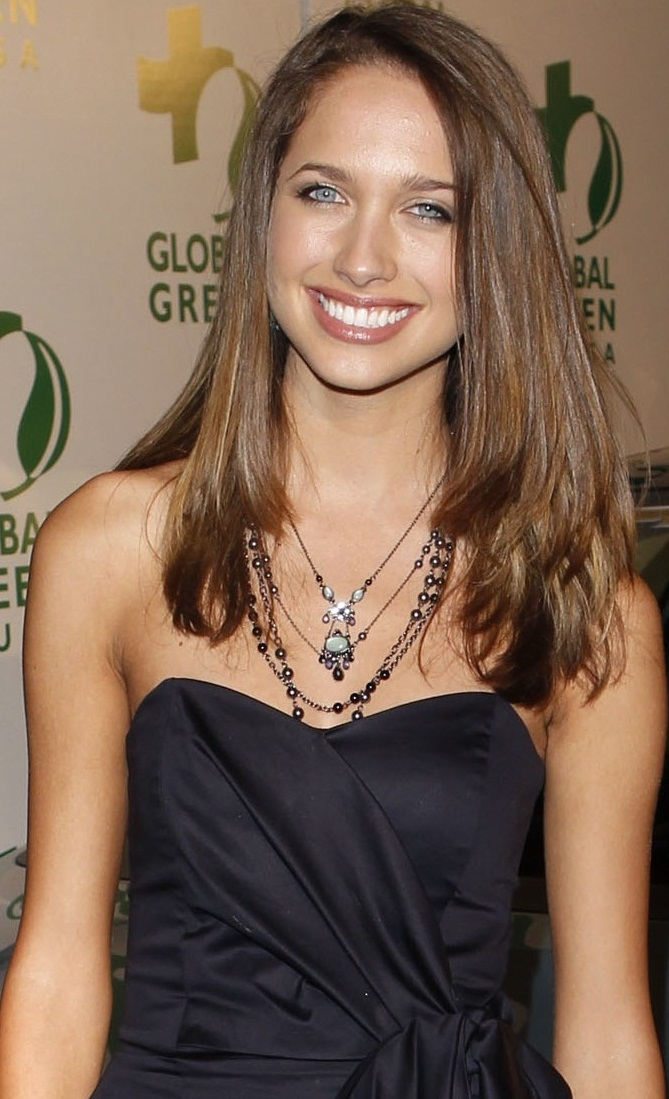
- Walsh in 2010
- Born: February 18, 1988 (age 38); Seattle, Washington, U.S.
- Occupation: Actress
- Years active: 2005–present

Maiara Walsh (/maɪˈɑːdə/; Brazilian Portuguese: [maˈjaɾɐ]; born February 18, 1988) is an actress and singer with citizenship in Brazil and the United States. She played Ana Solis on the sixth season of the ABC show Desperate Housewives, Meena Paroom on the Disney Channel sitcom Cory in the House and Simone Sinclair on the Freeform series Switched at Birth. She also portrayed Vicky Patterson in the film Identity Theft of a Cheerleader by Lifetime and Mandi Weatherly in the film Mean Girls 2 on Freeform.

== Early life ==
Walsh was born in Seattle, Washington to a Brazilian mother and an American father. Her family moved to São Paulo, Brazil when she was one year old where Portuguese became her first language. Walsh has said she was bullied as a child. After a few years, they moved back to Seattle where Maiara took an interest in music and the arts, diving into every musical and play offered by her school. At 11, she moved to Simi Valley, California, to pursue her acting career and graduated from Royal High School.

== Career ==
Walsh first appeared in the spin-off series Cory in the House (2007–2008) based on Disney Channel's original series That's So Raven (2003–2007). Walsh played the character Meena Paroom, who is an ambassador's daughter that attends the same private school as Cory Baxter. Meena (Maiara Walsh) is a series regular playing Cory Baxter’s best friend alongside Newt (Jason Dolley), heir to a political dynasty, become Cory's new friends.

In 2010, Walsh appeared in the second season of The Vampire Diaries as Sarah. In 2011, she co-starred in Mean Girls 2 as Mandi Weatherly, an A-list cliché girl also known as a "Plastic".

Walsh was the female lead in the pilot for the television series Zombieland as Wichita, taking over the role from Emma Stone. However, the series was not picked up.

Walsh had a recurring role as Simone Sinclair, in the ABC Family drama series Switched at Birth.

In 2019, Walsh starred in the Lifetime film Identity Theft of a Cheerleader as Vicky Patterson, a woman in her 30’s who pretends to be a high school student to have a second chance at education and becoming a Cheerleader. Walsh’s character was modeled after the real-life case of Wendy Brown. In 2020, she starred in Lifetime original movie Killer Dream Home alongside John DeLuca.

== Filmography ==
=== Film ===
Year	Title	Role	Notes
2008	Lullabye Before I Wake	Megan	
2010	The Prankster	Sage Ryan	
2011	Mean Girls 2	Mandi Weatherly	TV movie
2011	Empty Sky	Samantha McDonnell	Short
2012	General Education	Katie	
2012	Last Hours of Suburbia	Jennifer	
2013	Chocolate Milk	Lucy	Short
2013	The Starving Games	Kantmiss Evershot	
2014	The Armadillo	Molly Gardner	Short
2014	The Jazz Funeral	Emily	
2015	Vanish	Emma	
2015	Glitch	Sophie	
2015	Summer Camp	Michelle	
2016	Hopeless, Romantic	Summer	TV movie
2018	Her Boyfriend's Secret	Carrie	
2018	Ryder	Tanya	Short
2019	Babysplitters	Taylor Small	
2019	The Ex Next Door	Louisa	TV movie
2019	Identity Theft of a Cheerleader	Vicky Patterson	TV movie
2019	Young Blood	Ama Mendoza	Short
2020	Killer Dream Home	Jules Grant	TV movie
2020	Chasing the Rain	Kelley	
2021	The Accursed	Zara	
2021	The Secret Diary of an Exchange Student	Katherine Kenner (Kat)	
2021	Cash Cow	Jessica	Short
2026	Bight	Charlie	

=== Television ===
Year	Title	Role	Notes
2005	Unfabulous	Girl Cousin	Episode: "The Bar Mitzvah"
2007–08	Cory in the House	Meena Paroom	Main Cast
2009–10	Desperate Housewives	Ana Solis	Guest: Season 5, Main Cast: Season 6
2010	The Secret Life of the American Teenager	Girl in Light Blue Pajamas	Episode: "Lady Liberty"
2010	The Vampire Diaries	Sarah	Recurring Cast: Season 2
2011	Dr. Phil	Herself	Episode: "Mini Mean Girls"
2012–17	Switched at Birth	Simone Sinclair	Recurring Cast: Season 1-2, Guest: season 5
2014	Agents of S.H.I.E.L.D.	Callie Hannigan	Episode: "Seeds"
2015	Elizabeth Stanton's Great Big World	Herself	Episode: "Equestrian Adventures"
2016	Notorious	Willow	Recurring Cast
2018	The Last Ship	Mia Valdez	Recurring Cast: Season 5
2019	Criminal Minds	Nikki Pareno	Episode: "Night Lights"
2020	Girls from Ipanema	Sarah	Episode: "Choices"
2022–23	Reis	Abigail	Main Cast: Season 4-6
2022–24	Good Trouble	Jenna Peréz	Recurring Cast: Season 4-5

=== Music videos ===
Year	Title	Artist(s)
2008	"7 Things"	Miley Cyrus
2013	"Go With It"	Tokimonsta featuring MNDR
2015	"The Warrior"	Diego Boneta
2016	"Coming Over"	Dillon Francis and Kygo featuring James Hersey
2017	"Window"	MAGIC GIANT
2021	"THE BREACH"	Starset
