= Tom Scavo =

Fictional character on Desperate Housewives

Thomas Scavo
- Desperate Housewives character
- Doug Savant as Tom Scavo
- Portrayed by: Doug Savant
- Duration: 2004–2012
- First appearance: "Pilot"; 1x01, October 3, 2004
- Last appearance: "Finishing the Hat"; 8x23, May 13, 2012
- Created by: Marc Cherry
In-universe information
- Occupation: Chief Financial Officer (CFO); Corporate Executive; Owner of Scavo's Pizzeria; Stay-at-home dad Advertising Executive
- Father: Rodney Scavo
- Mother: Allison Scavo
- Brothers: Peter Scavo
- Sisters: Theresa Scavo
- Wife: Lynette Scavo (m. 1997)
- Children: Kayla Huntington Scavo; Porter Scavo; Preston Scavo; Parker Scavo; Penny Lynn Scavo; Paige Scavo; Patrick Scavo (miscarriage)
- Grandchildren: Sophie Mayer-Scavo (via Porter with Julie Mayer); Five other grandchildren
- Uncles: Vito Scavo
- Aunts: Penny Scavo
- Other relatives: Polly (aunt-in-law); Stella Wingfield (mother-in-law); Mr Lindquist (father-in-law; deceased); Glen Wingfield (first step-father-in-law; deceased); Frank Kaminsky (second step-father-in-law; deceased); Lucy Lindquist (sister-in-law); Lydia Lindquist (sister-in-law); Dave (brother-in-law; via Lucy); Herbert "Rashi" Brickmeyer (future brother-in-law; via Lydia)

Thomas Scavo /ˈskɑːvoʊ/ is a fictional character on the ABC television series Desperate Housewives, played by actor Doug Savant.

During Season 1, Tom was credited as a recurring role, but became credited as a series regular in Season 2. Early storylines often focused on Tom's position at an advertising firm and his need to travel often, usually leaving his wife Lynette alone to run the family. In Season 3, Tom's storylines focused on his attempts to find a new job after becoming tired of advertising. He opens "Scavo's Pizzeria", much to Lynette's dismay. Five years later, it becomes apparent that Tom is experiencing a mid-life crisis when he purchases and restores an early model convertible. After Lynette gives birth to Paige, Tom is diagnosed with male postpartum depression, which Lynette laughs off as a ridiculous notion. Tom separates from Lynette at the end of season 7 and dates Jane for the majority of season 8. Tom and Lynette reunite at the end of season 8.

== Storylines ==
=== Past ===
Thomas "Tom" Scavo was born in 1969. He is the eldest of three children (Tom, Theresa and Peter) born to Allison and Rodney Scavo. He has had three relationships prior to the events of the series, starting with one-night-stand Nora Huntington in 1994. He then dated Annabel Foster in 1997, but told her he is not a husband material when they worked together in advertising. He also had a one-night-stand with Renee Perry, during the short time when breaking off his engagement with Lynette Lindquist.

Tom met Lynette while working at the same advertising company. They married in 1997, and one year later, they moved to Fairview, 4355 Wisteria Lane.

Tom and Lynette had five children together: twins Preston and Porter born in 1998, Parker in 2000, Penny in 2004 and Paige, in 2016. Tom also has a daughter, Kayla Huntingoton, with Nora, as a result of his one-night stand. She is the eldest of his children, born in 1995.

=== Season 1 ===
Tom is frequently out of town and seems oblivious to Lynette's problems. Tom has been keeping his one-night stand with Renee a secret from his wife, and only his father, Rodney Scavo, knows about it. Tom decides to become a househusband after losing his promotion to Tim Douggan and quitting his job.

=== Season 2 ===
Midway through the second season, Tom returns to the workplace, sharing an employer with his wife for the second time. When Lynette's boss, Ed Ferrara (Currie Graham), asks Lynette to send explicit messages to his wife to help him improve his sex life, his wife finds out and threatens to leave him unless he fires the person who sent the IMs. Feeling he cannot fire Lynette, Ed tells his wife it was Tom, deciding to fire him instead, but Lynette warns him he will need a reasonable cause. To Lynette's horror, Ed finds one when he discovers that Tom has been falsifying expense reports. When Ed confronts him, the conversation ends with Tom punching Ed, and Tom is fired. Tom is found out to be meeting with another woman after Lynette follows him to Atlantic City and sees them embracing. Lynette later finds out that this woman is the mother of his daughter, born long before he married Lynette.

=== Season 3 ===
It is revealed that the woman Tom was embracing is Nora Huntington (Kiersten Warren). They had a one-night stand years before he met Lynette. She claims she conceived his child, a daughter named Kayla (Rachel G. Fox), but never told him.

Tom confesses to Lynette that he wants to open up a pizzeria. Nora consistently undermines Tom behind his back and tries to get Lynette to tell him to drop the idea, while planning to tell him that she will support him. Nora wants to restart her relationship with Tom, determined to make a proper family for Kayla, but Tom rejects her and tells Lynette, who warns Nora to keep her distance in the future. Tom and Lynette plan to fight Nora for custody of Kayla. Before they get to court, Nora is shot during a hostage situation at the supermarket and dies. Kayla moves in with Tom and their family.

Tom opens his pizzeria and, with Lynette's help. A little while later, Tom injures his back while working, leaving him confined to bed rest. Lynette hires a new chef, Rick Coletti (Jason Gedrick), as well as Mrs. McCluskey to look after Tom and the children when she is at work.

After Tom becomes jealous of Rick and suspicious of their relationship, he demands that he is fired, which Lynette refuses. Tom asks Rick to quit but he will not, claiming Lynette "doesn't want him gone". However, Lynette fires him after he confirms Tom's concerns and confesses his feelings to Lynette.

Lynette and Tom's marriage continues to decline and they don't speak for days. Trying to rebuild their marriage, Tom gets his old college friend and marriage counsellor to talk to them both without Lynette knowing his profession. She realizes and becomes even angrier about his 'ambush therapy'. When Tom's doctor informs him that his back has recovered, Tom and Lynette agree to have sex, which quickly turns violent and Lynette falls off the bed, banging her head on the bedside table. She goes to the hospital to be treated, and Tom finds out that Lynette has fallen for Rick and misses him. The doctor performs a CAT scan on Lynette, finds swollen lymph nodes, and suggests a biopsy, as it could be a sign of lymphoma.

=== Season 4 ===
In the third episode "The Game", Tom attends a party held by his friend Susan. Lynette shows up later, high from unknowingly eating marijuana brownies. When his mother-in-law Stella informs him, he helps her take all the brownies back to prevent the partygoers from eating them.

Later, a tornado hits Wisteria Lane. The Scavos take shelter in Mrs. McCluskey's basement with Ida Greenberg. Tom and the children are left in the basement while Lynette and Mrs. McCluskey go out looking for Ida's cat. Tom falls unconscious after having an asthma attack, due to a cat allergy. While the Scavos and Mrs. McCluskey survive the tornado, Ida is killed while saving Tom and Lynette's kids.

Rick returns, announcing that he is opening a new restaurant near the Scavos' pizzeria. Tom lies to the police when they investigate vandalism happening at Rick's restaurant but later admits to Lynette that he did vandalize Rick's restaurant out of jealousy. He is investigated again when a fire occurs in Rick's restaurant. Tom is confronted by Lynette, and Tom swears he left the founders ball to listen to a football game on the car radio and tells the same story to Rick after he finds a matchbox from Scavo's. The incident breaks out into a fight, and the police arrest Tom. He is later released after Lynette lies to them to provide him an alibi.

Eventually, it is revealed that Porter and Preston are responsible for starting the fire at Rick's restaurant. Tom and Lynette are unsure how to handle the situation, with Tom thinking they should go to therapy. Lynette discovers that Porter and Preston got the idea for starting the fire from Kayla, and she takes Kayla to therapy behind Tom's back. Tom soon discovers Kayla had lied to police with claims of abuse by Lynette, leading to Lynette being arrested. Kayla threatens to continue causing problems if Lynette comes back, forcing Tom to send Kayla away to live with her maternal grandparents

In the season finale, Tom and Lynette help with catering Bob and Lee's wedding. Tom gives advice to Lee about standing up for himself for wanting the ice sculpture be castle rather than a cherub, which escalates to Bob and Lee arguing then cancelling the wedding. Lynette and Tom get the two in the same room and Tom tells them that if they cannot decide over small decisions that they might as well not marry at all, and they should ask themselves whether they love each other enough that no problem can possibly tear them apart. His speech gets Bob and Lee to reconcile and to reaffirm to Lynette that their marriage is stronger than she thought.

=== Season 5 ===
In the first episode of season 5, Tom is going through a midlife crisis and he buys a Ford Mustang. He has difficulty disciplining his teenage sons as they treat him less respectfully than Tom was used to when he was their age. Lynette uses that against him by tricking Tom into letting the twins borrow his Mustang for a dance. When they come back a half-hour late, Tom angrily grounds them. When they claim he is more worried about the car than them, he kicks a mirror off it. Later, Tom confesses to Lynette that it was already broken and he had ordered a replacement, impressing her.

In "Mirror, Mirror," flashbacks show that Tom was electrocuted in an accident and nearly died, which pushes him to enjoy life as much as he could. In the present, he tells Lynette his plan to sell the pizzeria, buy an RV and spend a year traveling the country with his family. Lynette is not happy about this, leading to tensions between them. When Tom contacts one of Porter's friends' mothers, realtor Anne Schilling, she finds him a rehearsal space for the garage band he and some of the other Wisteria Lane men have started. He spends a lot of time there, and Lynnette confronts him about him allegedly having an affair with Anne, who has 'dropped by' with some items for the rehearsal space, among them a futon. Tom denies it but then finds a condom wrapper. He deduces that Porter is sleeping with some girl there, which is eventually revealed to be Anne Schilling. In the last episode, it is revealed that the Scavos' pizzeria has lost its business to low sales, and Tom is forced to throw a going-out-of-business sale to raise the money to repay his loans and repay Bree.

Tom becomes depressed from being out of work, and Lynette getting a new job working for Carlos Solis. In the season 5 finale, Tom decides to go back to college as a Chinese language major, to help him get back into marketing. Tom scored in the top five on the exam. However, his college plans are disrupted when Lynette reveals she is 3.5 months pregnant with twins.

=== Season 6 ===
Tom is excited about becoming a dad again, but Lynette is not sure if she loves her unborn children. Tom reassures her that when she holds them in her arms, she will love them with all her heart. These twins are Tom's sixth and seventh children, but Lynette loses one of them to a miscarriage when she pushes Celia Solis out of the way of a plane crash-landing on Wisteria Lane. It is also revealed that Tom has been cheating on some of his college courses out of fear of failing them. He is eventually forced to drop out of college and take over Lynette's job working for Carlos while she is on maternity leave.

=== Season 7 ===
Tom is diagnosed with postpartum depression, and is prescribed marijuana as a cure, which stuns Lynette. In the episode "Let Me Entertain You", Tom decides to hire his own mother, Allison, as a nanny for the new baby.

After an argument, Lynette fires her mother-in-law, but Tom overrules her. Tom and Lynette discover Allison has dementia, and admits her to a nursing home. Tom is deeply upset by his mother's illness.

After Renee finally admits to Lynette about their one-night affair that had occurred when Lynette and Tom had been "broken up", before their marriage. Lynette decides not to confront Tom and instead pulls continuous pranks on him as revenge. When Renee finds out what Lynette is doing, she tells Tom about it. Tom confronts Lynette and tells her that he wanted to tell her about Renee, but there was never a good time for that because he did not want to ruin the wonderful life they have together. Lynette understands and then forgives Tom.

Tom gets a major promotion at a new company and enjoys the work. Lynette is concerned about his over-working, but Tom tells her he feels more alive than ever. When Tom attends a conference, Lynette becomes jealous and refuses to be excluded from the seminars and meetings. Back home, Tom snaps at Lynette that after so many years supporting her, it hurts that she can't do the same for him. Renee tells Lynette that she has to choose between her own wants or being a good wife. Tom then hires the duo to decorate his office, but the two disagree on how to decorate. Renee overrules Lynette to give Tom the office he wants and Lynette yells at Tom over how he's changing. Tom retorts that he has to be this way in order to succeed, and Lynette needs to stop thinking of him the way he's been at home the last several years.

When Tom decides to book a luxurious holiday for the family and announces it, Lynette is annoyed at Tom for not consulting her first. While pitching holiday ideas to their kids, they begin to fight again. When they insult each other, they decide that it is only them who need to spend a holiday together. The holiday turns out badly and the relationship deteriorates, becoming awkward. When they return home, they decide to separate after a misunderstanding led them both to realize that that is what they both want.

=== Season 8 ===
By the beginning of season 8, Tom has moved away from Wisteria Lane. He and Lynette agree to work on their marriage by attending couples counselling, however when Tom begins dating a woman from his new building, Jane, Lynette seems to think there is no point anymore in continuing counselling if Tom doesn't still have faith in their marriage. Later, Tom and Jane plan to go on a trip to Paris, although Lynette stops him at the airport and confesses to him that she is involved in the murder of Gabrielle's stepfather. He then agrees to stay with her to help her cope, and Jane is left to go to Paris without him. In "With So Little to Be Sure Of", Lynette and Tom sign their divorce papers, but the document does not make it to court. Tom later breaks up with Jane due to his feelings for Lynette. The married couple reconcile in the final episode, and Tom and Lynette move to New York so Lynette can pursue her new career for Katherine Mayfair. The couple later buy a penthouse looking over Central Park, and they take care of their six grandchildren.
