= Lynette Scavo =

Fictional character on Desperate Housewives

- Desperate Housewives character
- Portrayed by: Felicity Huffman
- Duration: 2004–2012
- First appearance: "Pilot"; 1x01, October 3, 2004
- Last appearance: "Finishing the Hat"; 8x23, May 13, 2012
- Created by: Marc Cherry
- Spin-off appearances: Desperate Housewives: The Game (2006)
In-universe information
- Other names: Lynette Lindquist (maiden name); Lynnie (by her mother)
- Occupation: CEO; Former; Interior designer Restaurant Manager; Vice President of Advertising; Housewife
- Father: Mr. Lindquist (deceased)
- Mother: Stella Wingfield
- Siblings: Lucy Lindquist (sister); Lydia Lindquist (sister); Dave (brother-in-law; via Lucy); Herbert "Rashi" Brickmeyer (future brother-in-law; via Lydia); Peter Scavo (brother-in-law); Theresa Scavo (sister-in-law)
- Husband: Tom Scavo (m. 1997)
- Children: Porter Scavo; Preston Scavo; Parker Scavo; Penny Lynn Scavo; Paige Scavo; Patrick Scavo (miscarriage)
- Stepchildren: Kayla Huntington Scavo
- Grandchildren: Sophie Mayer-Scavo (via Porter with Julie Mayer); Five other grandchildren
- Other relatives: Glen Wingfield (first step-father; deceased); Frank Kaminsky (second step-father; deceased); Allison Scavo (mother-in-law); Rodney Scavo (father-in-law); Polly (aunt); Penny Scavo (aunt-in-law); Vito Scavo (uncle-in-law)

Lynette Scavo is a fictional character from the American comedy drama television series Desperate Housewives, which aired on ABC from 2004 to 2012. Developed by series creator Marc Cherry, Lynette was portrayed by Felicity Huffman. Lynette is introduced as a frustrated stay-at-home mother of four children, who she had with her businessman husband Tom (Doug Savant). Formerly a high-powered businesswoman herself, Lynette aspires to return to working life as she struggles with the day-to-day tasks of motherhood, whilst also surviving cancer post season 4.

While show creator Marc Cherry based Bree Van de Kamp's family on his teenage years, he based Lynette's on his childhood life. Other actresses who claim to have auditioned for the show include Alex Kingston, who was apparently turned down for being too curvy. Huffman won the Emmy Award for Outstanding Lead Actress in a Comedy Series for the role in 2005, and was nominated for Golden Globe Award for Best Actress – Television Series Musical or Comedy for 2005 to 2007.

== Storylines ==
=== Backstory ===
Lynette Lindquist was born on July 22, 1967, as the eldest of three daughters born to Stella and her husband, Mr. Lindquist. After he died, their mother had a series of unpleasant and unstable boyfriends and a drinking problem. She also beat her children and had cancer, when Lynette was 13 years old. Lynette told her that this was a punishment from God. Stella marries Glenn Wingfield, whom Lynette adores. After a short time, Glenn leaves, and Lynette blames her mother for driving him away for a long time. Lynette often attributed her need to control her environment as a result of her mother's sporadic alcoholic behaviour, something she addresses later in the series following a separation from Tom.

During college at Northwestern University, around 1990, Lynette met Renee Perry and two of them become loyal friends. She graduated and, while working in advertising, she became a "business shark" and almost a vice president, but she met Tom Scavo at the same company. He was so in love that he broke up with his girlfriend, Annabel Foster. Tom and Lynette married in 1997 and moved to Wisteria Lane the following year. Lynette had five children with Tom: twins Preston and Porter born in 1998, Parker born in 2000, Penny born in 2004 and Paige, born in 2016. She had a very successful career, but she gave up all that to become a stay-at-home mother.

In 1998, the Scavos met Mary Alice Young, Bree Van de Kamp, and Susan Mayer, followed by Gabrielle Solis in 2003, all becoming close friends.

=== Season 1 ===
As the series begins, Lynette is near to breaking point – she has been stuck at home alone with four kids for 6 years. Her husband is always away on business trips or at work. Lynette struggles to cope with her four children until Preston and Porter are prescribed medication for ADHD (attention-deficit hyperactivity disorder). Lynette decides not to medicate them and starts taking the medication herself so she can have more energy to make the costumes for a school play. Realizing she is addicted, Lynette manages to stop taking the pills after she and Tom hire a nanny. Unfortunately, she demands the nanny is fired after she discovers Tom is attracted to her. When Tom discovers Lynette had sabotaged a promotion Tom was going to accept, he quits his job, and in the season finale informs her that she will be going back to work while he becomes a stay-at-home dad.

=== Season 2 ===
Lynette gets a job at an advertising agency and for much of the season, dealing with obstacles at work and with her colleagues. Later she also testifies for Bree when she is accused of child abuse, but makes Bree realize she has a problem with alcohol. At the end of the season, Lynette thinks Tom is cheating on her when she follows him to Atlantic City, but instead discovers Tom has another child as a result of a one-night stand before he met Lynette–a daughter named Kayla Huntington.

=== Season 3 ===
Lynette has trouble adjusting to Kayla and her mother, Nora Huntington, being around. Lynette learns Nora wants Tom back and warns her to keep her distance. When Nora decides to move to Arizona with Kayla, Lynette and Tom plan to sue for custody. However, a court date becomes unnecessary when Nora and Lynette are held hostage in a supermarket by Carolyn Bigsby, and Nora is shot and killed during the standoff. As Nora lays dying, Lynette pledges to always care for Kayla. Lynette is shot in the arm but survives. Lynette and Kayla struggle to get along, as Kayla blames Lynette for her mother's death. When an out-of-work Tom follows his lifelong dream to open a pizzeria, Lynette attempts to support him. When a back injury leaves Tom bedridden and Lynette solely responsible for the operation of the restaurant, Lynette hires a manager, Rick, for whom she quickly develops romantic feelings. Tom, jealous and suspicious, demands that Rick leave the business, but Rick refuses. When he confesses to Lynette that he is attracted to her, she fires him, establishing firmly that her family matters more than her business. However, she is shown to be crying and upset afterward.

Following a nasty fall out of bed, Lynette undergoes a CAT scan which reveals swollen lymph nodes. In the season finale, Lynette tells her sister Lucy that she has been diagnosed with Hodgkin's lymphoma and asks her for a loan. Lucy is sympathetic but unable to help as her husband has just lost his job. Tom borrows the money from Lynette's mother, Stella Wingfield, much to his wife's chagrin. Stella tells Lynette that she is moving in to help with the family while Lynette fights cancer.

=== Season 4 ===
While undergoing chemotherapy, Lynette wears wigs to conceal her illness and avoid the pity of friends and neighbors. When she finally confesses, her friends are shocked but supportive. In a fit of pique at being served marijuana-laced brownies, Lynette decides that Stella has to go. While she soon changes her mind and asks her mother to stay, Stella is hurt and leaves the Scavo home. When Lynette learns that Glenn left Stella because he is gay, she tells her mother that she appreciates the time they've spent together. Stella, not wanting to ruin the happy memories, decides not to return and moves in with Glenn. A short time later, a tornado threatens Fairview and Lynette persuades her elderly neighbor, Karen McCluskey, to let the Scavos shelter in her cellar. Ida Greenberg and her cat join them but Tom, allergic to cats, starts struggling to breathe. Lynette attempts to sneak the cat out of the shelter, and Karen follows her into the storm. As the tornado hits, Karen and Lynette are forced to shelter in a bathtub in the Scavo house. After the tornado, Lynette and Karen find the McCluskey house in ruins. Lynette's family is safe, but only because Ida Greenberg died to save them. Kayla begins a pattern of disrespectful behavior, which culminates when Lynette slaps her for threatening Penny. Kayla takes revenge by burning herself with a curling iron and blaming Lynette, who is arrested. While in jail, Lynette tells Tom what Kayla did. When Kayla confesses that she lied, Tom sends her to live with her grandparents.

=== Season 5 ===
After the five-year time jump, Tom and Lynette are still running the pizzeria and having trouble with their twin sons, now teenagers. Tom is having a mid-life crisis – he often sides with his disobedient sons, and he starts a band with the other neighborhood husbands, all to the irritation of his wife.

Lynette and Tom discover that Porter is having an affair with Anne Schilling, an older married woman. Anne tells Porter that she is having his baby and they make plans to run away together. When Lynette confronts Anne about her affair with Porter, they are overheard by Anne's abusive husband Warren. When Lynette later finds Warren beating Anne severely, Warren jeeringly dares the women to phone the police, because Anne is guilty of statutory rape. Unfortunately, after the legal bills from Porter's court battle, and the payoff to Anne, the Scavos are broke and Tom is forced to sell the pizzeria.

Lynette returns to the workforce, working for Carlos Solis. In the finale, Lynette starts feeling ill and fears her cancer is recurring but discovers instead that she is pregnant with another set of twins.

=== Season 6 ===
In her first trimester, Lynette is depressed about the prospect of having twins so late in life and fears she will not love them. She hides the pregnancy from her boss, Carlos, so as not to jeopardize her promotion. She eventually reveals her secret to him without knowledge, assuming Gabrielle had told him the truth. He tells her that her options are to move to Miami or to quit. He then gives her a huge amount of work to do in one night, but when Lynette attends her daughter's Christmas pageant instead, Carlos subsequently fires her. Lynette and Gaby's friendship becomes strained, but is restored when Lynette saves Celia Solis from being hit by a plane that crashes on Wisteria Lane. Following the crash, Lynette is in pain and realizes something is wrong with the babies. Her doctor discovers one of the twins needs circulatory surgery. While unconscious, Lynette dreams of the struggle of life with a disabled child. The dream ends with her disabled son's graduation, where he thanks her for always challenging him. When she awakens, Tom tells her that the ill baby died but the other survived. Despite her early reluctance to have these twins at all, Lynette sobs for her lost baby. She has trouble processing her grief until Tom suggests that she stay home with their daughter after she is born.

Later in the season, Preston returns from Europe with a Russian woman named Irina. Lynette investigates and learns that Irina is a gold digger and prostitute, but Irina is killed by the Fairview Strangler. She invites the troubled teen Eddie Orlofsky to live with her family, unaware that he is the Fairview Strangler. Eddie becomes protective of Lynette, attacking Porter and nearly attacking Tom when each of them treats her in a way Eddie regards as disrespectful. Tom and Lynette agree that Eddie must see a therapist. The therapist suggests that Eddie's progress would improve if his mother accompanied him to therapy. However, no one answers the door at Eddie's house even though his mother's car is still there, and Lynette's suspicions are raised. When she learns that both Irina and Eddie's mother have been found dead, she confronts Eddie at his house, and he traps her inside. With her life at Eddie's mercy, Lynette goes into labor. She gives birth to her daughter, Paige, with Eddie's help. Eddie attempts to flee, but Lynette begs him to turn himself in, telling him that she would be proud to have a son like him. Eddie asks Lynette to do it for him. Lynette agrees, letting him hold the baby while she dials 911.

=== Season 7 ===
While raising their new baby daughter Paige, Tom is diagnosed with male postpartum depression. She invites her old college roommate, Renee Perry, to stay when she learns of her on-going divorce. But she is astonished that Renee is taking Tom's diagnosis seriously. Renee (who is still staying in the Scavo home) warns Lynette that she should take Tom's concerns more seriously, but Lynette ignores this. After Tom and Renee go out to dinner, Lynette tells her she needs to spend less time with Tom. That night, Lynette realizes she needs to be there for her husband more often and the two decide to simply talk to each other rather than make love, thus making progress in their marriage. Renee later apologizes to Lynette and is forgiven and reveals that she has just bought Edie Britt's former home on Wisteria Lane. Lynette is hesitant to the idea, but happy, nonetheless.

Lynette and Renee start a new business in interior design, after a little persuasion from Renee. Renee suggests hiring Susan as Lynette's nanny. Lynette ends up comforting Susan when she feels bad about not being as financially stable as her friends. Mike has taken the job in Alaska, and Susan accepts Lynette's offer to be baby Paige's nanny.

Lynette is shown to be insecure in their marriage when Tom complains that she never "talks him up" to her friends. She admits to him that this is because she believes he is so perfect, that she doesn't deserve to be with him. He tells her that she is the type of person who still cries when their last child grows out of their onesies, even after raising four other children. Lynette learns that Renee and Tom had a one-night stand 20 years ago, which happened right after Tom and Lynette became engaged and she was visiting her parents, while Tom and Lynette were "taking a break". While she is very upset, she doesn't confront Tom and instead begins a series of pranks against him as payback. When Renee finds out what Lynette is doing, she tells Tom about it. After Tom confronts Lynette, they make amends after he apologizes.

Tom gets a new job that provides well, and Renee encourages Lynette to spend money more freely but also warns her that Tom will be spending more time away. They have another argument after returning home from attending a conference, when Lynette tires of being a stay-at-home mom again. Tom confides that he is hurt that she won't support him the way he had supported her for years. Lynette complains to Renee, who advises that Lynette has to choose whether to be a good wife or not. Tom hires the duo to decorate his office in the style of an arrogant boss but Lynette vetoes it as she feels it's not right for him. Renee overrules her to give Tom the office he wants, which leads to more arguing between Tom and Lynette.

When Tom decides to book a luxurious holiday for the family and announces it Lynette is annoyed, having her own ideas for a holiday. The two then pitch to their kids what they think is the best idea, which leads to yet another fight between them; this time however they insult each other. After the argument, they decide they should take the trip together, without the kids. The holiday turns out badly and the relationship deteriorates further. When they return home Tom leads Lynette to believe that he will be spending a while in an apartment near to his work offices. Lynette is surprised to find that Tom's unpacked suitcase from the holiday is not in the bedroom, convincing her that Tom had left her--however he comes back home that evening. He tells Lynette that he had only gone to buy the ingredients. Lynette questions him why it had taken him two hours, leading Tom to reveal that he had left but came back when he considered that Lynette would have to lie about where Tom was to her friends. The two talk for a while and Lynette confesses that when she thought Tom had left, she felt relieved, leading the pair to finally decide to separate.

In the same evening that Lynette decides to separate from Tom, she, along with Bree and Susan, walk into Gaby's living room to find that Carlos has murdered Alejandro, Gaby's stepfather. The four ladies agree to cover up the murder to protect Carlos, stuffing the body in a wooden box used as a table at the evening's dinner party.

=== Season 8 ===
Not only is Lynette suffering strain from the murder but she is also having a tough time with her separation from Tom. At first she is post reluctant to tell the children, but after she has a one-night stand with Tom, he decides to tell them. They then clash over Tom letting the children have whatever they want, making Lynette the bad person who always says "No". Lynette talks to Tom about booking couples therapy to try to heal their relationship. However, after Renee comments that Tom has been taking care of himself lately (dressing smartly and working out) and suspects he has been dating someone, Lynette becomes worried. She goes to a gym class with Renee to spy on the trainer she believes Tom is seeing, but realizes he is actually dating the woman's mother, Jane, leaving Lynette devastated. Terrified of what would happen to her children if she is caught by Chuck, Lynette confesses her secret to Tom just as he is about to leave for Paris with Jane. He decides not to go, leaving his relationship on the rocks, which leaves him furious with Lynette. Lynette then feels bad about him having to stay for her, as he thinks that she might be the "one". Lynette then tells him to go to Paris. This leads Lynette to try to experiment with new dates herself, and meets a new man, who seems very keen on her. She finally sleeps with Renee's hairdresser and moves on, though at first she cries during the sex. She along with her friends finally find out that Bree tried to commit suicide because of them, and after Bree rejects them, was loss for words. Just as Lynette is getting used to single life, Porter and Preston move back home, needing a place to stay after losing their apartment. Lynette is already frazzled when she learns that Porter is the father of Julie Mayer's baby, making Susan and Lynette grandmothers.

Her rivalry with Jane becomes more heated at Penny's birthday party when they continually try to one up each other. Her world is further shocked when Jane announces that she and Tom will be moving in together. Lynette is devastated even more when Tom suggests they see a lawyer regarding divorce. Jane then later tries to reconcile with Lynette, but then she begins to choke on a snack. Lynette hesitates to help Jane, but ultimately comes to her aid and saves her. However, Jane is alarmed at Lynette thinking such an action over believing she thought of letting Jane die. Then on the day of Mike Delfino's funeral, Tom and Lynette comfort each other as Jane looks on. Sparks of their marriage appear and while sitting at the service Lynette thinks back to the day Tom moved out. Mike tries to understand why Lynette isn't fighting for her marriage. He then reveals that everyone in the neighborhood knows that she and Tom belong together. This memory finally causes Lynette to make the decision to fight for her marriage, win Tom back, and dissolve his romance with Jane. In With So Little to Be Sure Of Lynette and Tom officially sign their divorce papers ending their marriage. When Lynette hears Tom hasn't filed the papers, she is hopeful but after seeing Tom and Jane kiss at the office, she accepts a date from Tom's boss. It goes well at first but when he plans to transfer Tom to India, Lynette breaks it off. The boss sardonically insults Lynette before Tom about her being hung up on another man and after insults to her, Tom punches him. He and Jane argue with Jane realizing that Tom still loves Lynette and they break up. Tom goes to see Lynette but sees her hugging Lee and (not seeing who it is), thinks Lynette has moved on. He tells her he is filing but in a later talk, they realize how much they love each other and reconcile.

Katherine Mayfair comes back to Wisteria Lane, offering Lynette a job at her new food company. Lynette doesn't want it as she and Tom are together again but wants to prove herself. At first taken aback, Tom lets Lynette know he'll support her no matter what. It's revealed in the final moments that the two move to New York, Lynette becoming a successful businesswoman and eventually watching over six grandchildren.

In the finale, Julie gives birth to Porter's daughter, who is Lynette's granddaughter.

== Creation and casting ==
Series creator Marc Cherry partially based Lynette off of his mother Martha in being an overwhelmed mother.

In 2019, Eva Longoria wrote a letter claiming that she was bullied on the set of Desperate Housewives and that it was Huffman who helped her by telling the "bully" to leave her alone and it ceased: "Felicity could feel that I was riddled with anxiety even though I never complained or mentioned the abuse to anyone."

== Reception ==
Along with costars Marcia Cross and Teri Hatcher, Huffman was nominated for the Golden Globe Award for Best Performance by an Actress in a Television Comedy Series in 2005. She lost to Hatcher.

Reviewing the first season, Tricia Mayes wrote that Lynette was "perhaps the person we cheer for the most". Mayes cites Lynette's storylines with her children as proof that Cherry "recognizes that every mother has been driven to the edge by her kids at one point." In a review of the second season, James O'Neill quipped, "If Marcia Cross was the real star of season one then it's Felicity Huffman who really shines this time around." Admitting that her stories "do take a while to get going", O'Neill was drawn to the plot of Lynette and Tom working together.

Screen Rant ranked Lynette as the 4th best Desperate Housewives character, writing that she was "definitely nicer and more watchable than Edie" and not "always the most sympathetic character".
