= Desperate Housewives season 4 =

Desperate Housewives
- Season 4
- ABC promotional poster for the fourth season of Desperate Housewives. From left to right: Bree, Edie, Susan, Gabrielle, and Lynette.
- Starring: Teri Hatcher; Felicity Huffman; Marcia Cross; Eva Longoria; Nicollette Sheridan; Ricardo Antonio Chavira; Andrea Bowen; Doug Savant; Kyle MacLachlan; Dana Delany; Brenda Strong; James Denton
- No. of episodes: 17

Release
- Original network: ABC
- Original release: September 30, 2007 – May 18, 2008

Season chronology
- ← Previous; Season 3 Next → Season 5

The fourth season of Desperate Housewives, an American television series created by Marc Cherry, premiered on September 30, 2007, on ABC. Filming for the series was interrupted by the 2007–2008 Writers Guild of America strike in November 2007, after production on the two-episode tornado storyline wrapped. The first part, "Something's Coming", aired on December 2, 2007. "Welcome to Kanagawa", the second part and the last episode filmed before the strike, was originally going to be aired after the strike's resolution, but aired on January 6, 2008. Seven additional episodes were produced for the fourth season after the strike, the first of which aired on April 13, 2008. The final two episodes served as a two-part finale and were aired consecutively on May 18, 2008. A total of 17 episodes aired as part of the season, with one recap special airing on September 23, 2007.

The series continues to focus on Wisteria Lane residents Susan Delfino, Lynette Scavo, Bree Hodge, Gabrielle Solis and Edie Britt, with Mary Alice Young returning as the series' narrator. Katherine Mayfair and her family are introduced in this season and are the center of the season's mystery. Critical reception for the season was positive, and ratings increased from the third season. The series drew in an average of 17.9 million viewers per episode during the 2007-08 American television season, becoming the sixth most-watched program of the year and the most-watched scripted program for the first time.

The series was released on a five-disc DVD box set by ABC Studios on September 2, 2008, in Region 1, October 29, 2008 in Region 4, November 3, 2008 in Region 2, and March 17, 2009, in Region 5.

== Production ==
Joe Keenan, one of the three executive producers during the third season, as well as writer of the critically acclaimed season episode "Bang", did not return for season four as executive producer, but as consulting producer. Replacing Keenan, and joining Marc Cherry and George W. Perkins as executive producers, is season three writer and co-executive producer Bob Daily, whose previous work include sitcoms Frasier and Out of Practice, as well as cartoon series Rugrats. Keenan will serve as Cherry's second-in-command for the next two years. Also joining as executives producers are writers and former co-executive producers John Pardee and Joey Murphy who have been on the show since its first season.

This is also the first season the synthesized version of Danny Elfman's main title theme was used, as it would be the rest of the series.

== Cast ==
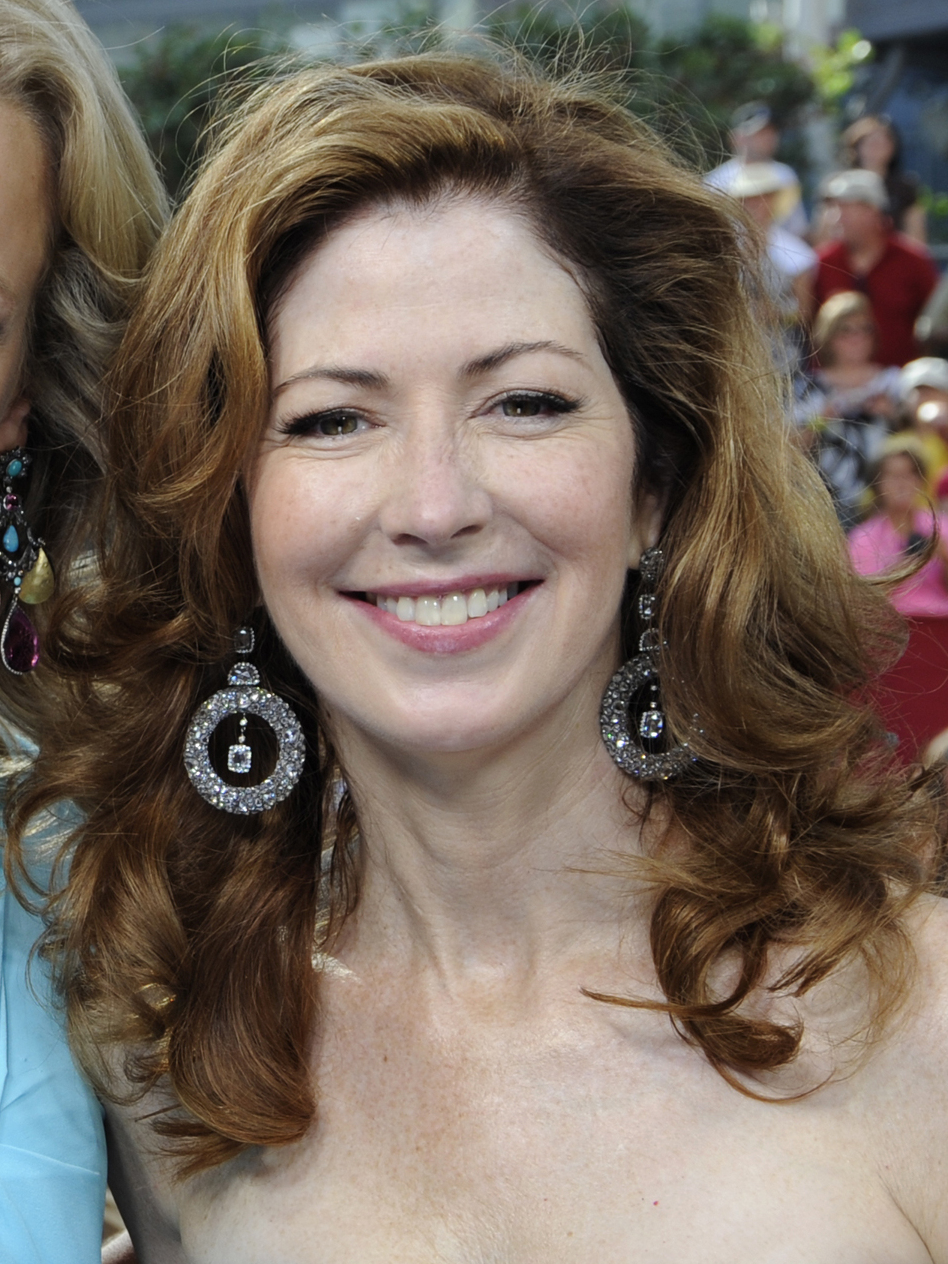
Delany's character was the subject of the season's main mystery.

The fourth season had twelve roles receiving star billing. All eleven starring actors from the previous season returned for this season. The series is narrated by Brenda Strong, who portrays the deceased Mary Alice Young, as she observes from beyond the grave the lives of the Wisteria Lane residents and her former best friends. Teri Hatcher portrayed Susan Delfino, who is finally married after three seasons searching for a stable relationship. Felicity Huffman portrayed Lynette Scavo, who fights cancer during the first half of the season and deals with her step-daughter's behavior in the second half. Marcia Cross portrayed Bree Hodge, married for the second time and faking pregnancy in an attempt to protect her daughter. Eva Longoria portrayed former model Gabrielle Lang, now the wife of Fairview's mayor. Nicollette Sheridan portrayed Edie Britt, who faked suicide in the previous season finale. Ricardo Antonio Chavira portrayed Carlos Solis, now divorced from Gabrielle but still in love with her while involved in a relationship with Edie. Andrea Bowen portrayed Julie Mayer, the responsible and caring daughter of Susan. Doug Savant portrayed Tom Scavo, Lynette's husband and now owner of a pizzeria. Kyle MacLachlan portrayed Orson Hodge, Bree's second husband and the man that ran over Mike in the second season finale. James Denton portrayed Mike Delfino, now Susan's husband who starts using drugs. Dana Delany is introduced in the role of Katherine Mayfair, whose mysterious arc is the season's main storyline.

Five out of six actors who received "also starring" billing from the previous season returned. Shawn Pyfrom, portrayed Bree's gay son Andrew Van de Kamp. Lyndsy Fonseca was cast in the new role of Dylan Mayfair, Katherine's daughter and part of the season's mystery. Joy Lauren reappeared in the role of Danielle Van de Kamp, Bree's pregnant daughter. Brent Kinsman, Shane Kinsman and Zane Huett, played Preston Scavo, Porter Scavo and Parker Scavo, Lynette's troublesome children. Rachel Fox was promoted to regular after guest starring in several episodes in the previous season as Kayla Huntington Scavo, Tom's mischievous daughter and the result of an affair he had before meeting Lynette.

This season featured many established and new guest stars. Kathryn Joosten portrayed Karen McCluskey, one of the most prominent residents of Wisteria Lane, Richard Burgi appeared as Karl Mayer, Susan's ex-husband who is also married again, Pat Crawford Brown played elderly neighbor Ida Greenberg, whereas Tuc Watkins and Kevin Rahm made their debut in this season respectively as Bob Hunter and Lee McDermott, a gay couple from Chicago who move to the lane. Part of Lynette's storyline were Polly Bergen in the role of Stella Wingfield, Lynette's mother who moves to the Scavo family home to support her daughter in her battle against cancer, and Jason Gedrick playing Rick Coletti, who had feelings for Lynette in the previous season and now opens his own restaurant to compete with Scavo Pizzeria. Part of Bree's storyline were Shirley Knight returning as Phyllis Van de Kamp, Bree's first mother-in-law, and Dakin Matthews appearing as Reverend Sykes, reverend at the local Presbyterian church. Part of Gabrielle's storyline were John Slattery playing Victor Lang, Gabrielle's new husband and the mayor of Fairview, Mike Farrell in the role of Milton Lang, Victor's father, Jeff Doucette portraying Father Crowley, priest at the local Catholic church, Justine Bateman playing Ellie Leonard, a drug dealer who rents a room in the Solises' house, and Jesse Metcalfe reappearing as John Rowland, Gabrielle's ex-lover and former gardener. Part of the main mystery arc were Nathan Fillion portraying Adam Mayfair, a doctor and Katherine's second husband, Ellen Geer appearing as Lillian Simms, Katherine's aunt, Melora Walters playing Sylvia Greene, Adam's former patient and ex-lover from Chicago, and Gary Cole in the role of Wayne Davis, a cop and Katherine's abusive first husband. Additionally, Gale Harold was introduced as Susan's new lover Jackson Braddock during the five-year jump featured at the end of the season.

For the 14th Annual Screen Actors Guild Awards, Fillion, Joosten and Slattery were nominated along with the rest of the main cast for the Outstanding Performance by an Ensemble in a Comedy Series award due to their many appearances this season.

== Episodes ==
No. overall	No. in season	Title	Directed by	Written by	Original release date	U.S. viewers (millions)
71	1	"Now You Know"	Larry Shaw	Marc Cherry	September 30, 2007	19.32
Edie's suicide attempt is revealed to be a ploy to manipulate Carlos, but she almost dies when Carlos does not show up in time to rescue her. Carlos takes Edie to the hospital and is forced to call off plans to run away with Gabrielle. One month later, former Wisteria Lane resident and Susan's old friend Katherine Mayfair moves into her aunt's house with her second husband Adam, a gynecologist, and her daughter Dylan. Julie reunites with Dylan, but is puzzled to learn that Dylan has no recollection of their childhood friendship. Lynette tells her friends about her cancer, while Bree and Orson continue to hide her fake pregnancy from the neighbors. Edie learns about Carlos' illegal offshore bank account in the Cayman Islands. Susan worries she might be entering menopause, but discovers that she is actually pregnant, much to her and Mike's delight.
72	2	"Smiles of a Summer Night"	David Grossman	Bob Daily & Matt Berry	October 7, 2007	17.82
Susan tries to involve Mike as a parent in her house, but she becomes torn when he convinces her to forbid Julie from attending a wild house party. Lynette bans Tom from her chemotherapy sessions for being too emotional and asks Gabrielle to accompany her instead, but discovers she dreads the prospect of visiting Lynette because she had watched her father die of cancer. Bree is infuriated when Katherine refuses to share her secret lemon meringue pie recipe with her, prompting Bree to sneak into Katherine's house and steal the recipe. In the process, Bree overhears Katherine slapping Dylan for asking about her birth father. Edie blackmails Carlos with the Cayman Islands account and forces him to get engaged to her.
73	3	"The Game"	Bethany Rooney	Joey Murphy & John Pardee	October 14, 2007	18.89
Julie and Dylan break into Dylan's old room to investigate Dylan's past, but Katherine catches them and orders Dylan to stay away from Julie. Susan and Mike host a charades party at their house, which is disrupted by a series of misfortunes: Stella feeds an unsuspecting Lynette pot brownies to help her through the side effects of chemotherapy, causing Lynette to behave erratically at the party; Gabrielle is unhappy upon learning of Carlos and Edie's engagement and tries to flirt with Adam, which infuriates Carlos; Katherine accuses Gabrielle of flirting with Adam and brings up Gabrielle's affair with John, upsetting Victor; Gabrielle, in turn, reveals that Bree heard Katherine slap Dylan, which prompts Katherine to reveal that her first husband did "the worst thing that a father can do" to their daughter; Susan and Bree argue when Bree, in an effort to cover up her fake pregnancy, sends Susan to a sketchy gynecologist in a rough neighborhood, though the two eventually make amends; and Carlos is alarmed when Victor hints that he would murder the man who would have an affair with his wife.
74	4	"If There's Anything I Can't Stand"	Larry Shaw	Alexandra Cunningham & Lori Kirkland Baker	October 21, 2007	18.21
Susan is determined to win over Bob and Lee, the new gay couple on Wisteria Lane, but fails miserably when she ruins Bob's expensive designer suit, forcing Mike to pay for a new suit. Realizing that Tom is repulsed by her baldness, Lynette shops for a new set of wigs to improve their sex life. Edie learns she has crabs, which she has transmitted to Carlos, Gabrielle and ultimately Victor. Bree is thrown a surprise baby shower and reunites with Phyllis, who discovers her fake pregnancy. After the two argue, Phyllis threatens to expose Bree's hoax to the guests at the shower, but decides against it. Nevertheless, Phyllis secretly takes Danielle away from the convent to help her raise the baby. When Katherine brings her ailing aunt Lillian Simms home, Lillian attempts to talk to Dylan about the "incident" that happened during her childhood, but Katherine intervenes. Lillian writes Dylan a secret note and dies.
75	5	"Art Isn't Easy"	David Grossman	Jason Ganzel	October 28, 2007	18.28
Lynette runs against Katherine for president of Wisteria Lane's homeowners' association in order to protect her children's tree house, while Katherine wants to remove Bob and Lee's noisy fountain, which has made it difficult for Susan and Mike to sleep at night. Susan votes for Katherine, giving her the win, but Katherine decides to let Lynette keep her tree house after Adam asks her to be friendly with the neighbors. Bob and Lee refuse to take down the fountain and threaten Katherine by revealing that they know what happened with Adam at the Chicago hospital. Bree convinces Danielle to let her raise the baby and invites Phyllis to babysit on weekends. Gabrielle runs into John, who is unhappily married and wants to rekindle their affair, but she refuses. Carlos visits John and forgives him for his affair with Gabrielle. Carlos proposes that he and Gabrielle break up with Edie and Victor and then reunite in a few months. Edie hires a private investigator who takes pictures of Gabrielle and Carlos making out.
76	6	"Now I Know, Don't Be Scared"	Larry Shaw	Susan Nirah Jaffee & Dahvi Waller	November 4, 2007	18.58
Susan discovers that Mike's father, Nick, whom he claimed was dead, is actually in prison for murder. Susan meets Nick, who shows no remorse or guilt but laments how his arrest affected Mike in his youth. Lynette is informed by her oncologist that she has been cured of cancer. Adam delivers Danielle's baby boy, named Benjamin Tyson Hodge, and Bree offers to take care of him when Danielle leaves for college. After Edie unsuccessfully attempts to report Carlos' offshore account to the IRS, Carlos ends things with her. Gabrielle leaves Victor a voicemail saying that she is leaving him, but is bribed with a large check by his father, Milton Lang, to stay married to Victor for 13 more months until he has been elected as governor. When Gabrielle tells Carlos about Milton's offer, Carlos admits he embezzled $10 million years earlier. Realizing Carlos had that money during their divorce, Gabrielle angrily throws him out. Victor tells Gabrielle he is willing to do anything to save their marriage, before Edie vengefully exposes Gabrielle and Carlos' affair to Victor.
77	7	"You Can't Judge a Book By Its Cover"	David Warren	Chuck Ranberg & Anne Flett-Giordano	November 11, 2007	18.63
Bree discovers that Mike may be addicted to painkillers and tells Susan about it, who finds a large bag of pills hidden in his flashlight. Mike explains to her that he started taking the pills after hurting himself while on a job, as he did not want to take time off from work in order to continue providing for his family. Mike flushes the pills down the drain, but secretly retrieves them while Susan is asleep. Katherine tries to keep Dylan from the truth about her father by revealing that he was physically abusive. Stella leaves after learning none of her daughters want her to live with them. Bree gets her grandson, Benjamin, circumcised despite Orson's objections, since Benjamin is not related to Orson by blood. During a boat trip, Gabrielle knocks Victor overboard after mistakenly assuming he was going to kill her for her affair with Carlos. After Gabrielle and Carlos bring Victor back on board, Victor threatens Carlos with a knife; Gabrielle knocks Victor overboard again, but they are unable to find him.
78	8	"A Distant Past"	Jay Torres	Joe Keenan	November 25, 2007	18.64
Adam receives a susprise visit from Sylvia, a former patient from Chicago with whom he might have had an affair. Susan tries to set up Julie with Barrett, unaware that he is Mike's drug dealer. Mike tries to obtain a prescription for pills from Adam or Orson, to which Orson agrees when he learns that Mike's shoulder pain stems from the hit-and-run he caused; Susan discovers the pills hidden in Mike's truck. Lynette tries to find Stella with the help of her stepfather, Glen, only to discover that Glen left Stella because he is gay. The police question Gabrielle about Victor and find his body washed ashore. Victor pretends to suffer from memory loss in front of the police, but privately tells Gabrielle that he remembers everything. Bree makes Benjamin sleep on the bed between her and Orson as she believes it will help them all bond, disrupting the couple's sex life. Andrew moves out of Bree's house and into an apartment in order to be independent.
79	9	"Something's Coming"	David Grossman	Joey Murphy & John Pardee	December 2, 2007	20.65
The residents of Wisteria Lane prepare to protect themselves from an impending tornado. While arguing with Mike about his intake of pills, Susan accidentally falls down a flight of stairs. Susan threatens to leave Mike if he does not check himself into rehab, to which he agrees. After witnessing Katherine spit on Sylvia, Bree invites Sylvia inside for a cup of tea and learns about Adam's supposed affair. Sylvia barricades herself in Bree's bathroom, causing Katherine, Adam, Bree, Orson, and Benjamin to be trapped in a closet, where Katherine discovers from Bree that the affair is true. Lynette and Karen take refuge in a bathtub in the Scavo house, while Tom, Ida, and the children get buried in Karen's basement. Gabrielle and Edie fight for the only copy of the paperwork for Carlos' Cayman Islands account but lose it because of the tornado. They ultimately get stuck together in a crawlspace in Edie's house. Victor pursues Carlos with a gun, but is fatally impaled by a flying fence post, while Carlos suffers a serious injury from flying debris.
80	10	"Welcome to Kanagawa"	Larry Shaw	Jamie Gorenberg & Jordon Nardino	January 6, 2008	19.78
Lynette learns that Ida sacrificed herself to save her children and Tom. She tries to pay her back by scattering her ashes on the baseball field where she used to play, but gets caught by the police. Katherine and Adam identify Sylvia's body at the morgue. Adam finds Aunt Lillian's note and leaves Katherine, accusing her of hiding the truth about her ex-husband. Desperate to have her roof repaired, Bree attempts to secure the services of a gay contractor by "pimping out" Andrew while staying with Susan, who schemes to extend Bree's stay in her house because she enjoys her housekeeping skills. Gabrielle discovers she has been cut out of Victor's will, as Milton owns all of it and refuses to give her anything because of her affair. She decides to remarry Carlos, who hides from her that he may permanently lose his eyesight. Dylan finds burned parts of Aunt Lillian's note, which contains the words "Your father was murdered".
81	11	"Sunday"	David Grossman	Alexandra Cunningham & Lori Kirkland Baker	April 13, 2008	16.37
Lynette asks to accompany Bree to church, but embarrasses her by asking questions to the minister. Lynette later explains that she turned to religion to help her understand why she survived both her cancer and the tornado, and Bree apologizes for judging her earlier. Gabrielle learns from Edie that Carlos' blindness is permanent and punishes him for lying to her. When Carlos confesses that he was afraid Gabrielle would leave him because he is broke and blind, she reassures him that she loves him. While Mike is in rehab, Susan receives a visit from her handsome cousin Tim, whom she catches having sex with Katherine. Tim reveals to Susan that he lost his virginity to Katherine when he was 16 but later witnessed her hitting her ex-husband with a candlestick during a heated argument. Dylan shows the note to Julie and turns to Adam for help, but after agreeing to give Katherine one last alibi, he lies to Dylan that Katherine did not kill her father.
82	12	"In Buddy's Eyes"	Larry Shaw	Jeff Greenstein	April 20, 2008	15.75
Orson starts sleepwalking because of his guilt over running over Mike and confesses the truth in front of Julie. Bree and Katherine join forces to plan the Founder's Ball, but Bree feels that Katherine is trying to steal the spotlight and purposely gives her food poisoning; the two ultimately realize they are more alike than they thought. Struggling to adjust to Carlos' blindness, Gabrielle takes advantage of his condition by parking in handicapped spaces. Rick Coletti opens a pizzeria across the street from the Scavos, angering Tom, who throws a brick through his window out of jealousy. Lynette learns that a fire took place at Rick's restaurant and suspects that Tom is responsible for the arson. Julie convinces Dylan to come to the Founder's Ball to enjoy herself and take her mind off her father. An unknown person circles Dylan's photo in the newspaper.
83	13	"Hello, Little Girl"	Bethany Rooney	Susan Nirah Jaffee & Jamie Gorenberg	April 27, 2008	16.35
As Bree and Orson move back to their house, Mike returns home from rehab. Katherine convinces Bree to start a catering business together. When Mike and Susan learn the truth about the hit-and-run, Susan forbids Orson from coming near her family, while Bree throws him out of her house. Lynette and Tom argue over the fire and Rick's feelings for Lynette, culminating in a physical altercation between Tom and Rick at Scavo Pizzeria. Porter and Preston confess to Lynette that they set Rick's restaurant on fire, after they overheard Tom saying that Rick would take Lynette away from her family. Carlos, feeling that he is demanding a lot from Gabrielle, adopts a female dog guide named Roxy. The dog causes issues for Gabrielle and she decides to get rid of her. Wayne Davis, Katherine's ex-husband, catches up to Dylan, who starts meeting secretly with him.
84	14	"Opening Doors"	David Grossman	Dahvi Waller & Jordon Nardino	May 4, 2008	16.76
Bree gives Orson an ultimatum to turn himself in for running over Mike, but he refuses and moves in with Edie, who kisses him while they are drunk; Bree sees them through a window. Gabrielle rents out her guest room to Ellie, an art student, but when Gabrielle starts suspecting that Ellie is a prostitute, she enlists the help of Bob and Lee to catch her in the act. Ellie later confesses to Gabrielle that she is using her room as a tattoo parlor so that she can raise money to open her own shop, but is shown hiding drugs in her drawer. At a Lamaze pregnancy class, Susan runs into Karl, who makes snide remarks to her and brags about his current wife Marisa, a young law professor, until Mike reveals that he went to rehab. Upon learning that Kayla was the one who convinced Porter and Preston to burn down Rick's restaurant, Lynette takes Kayla to a therapist, but Kayla threatens to tell the police that the twins committed the crime. Katherine discovers that Dylan is secretly meeting Wayne and declares that she is no longer afraid of him.
85	15	"Mother Said"	David Warren	Chuck Ranberg & Anne Flett-Giordano	May 11, 2008	15.43
Adele Delfino, Mike's overbearing Southern mother, arrives for a visit and continuously insults Susan for not being a "complete" housewife. Susan asks Mike to make Adele apologize and goes into labor, giving birth to a baby boy. Gabrielle and Carlos discover that Ellie is a drug dealer, and the police ask the couple to pretend not to know anything so they can catch Ellie's supplier, in exchange of ending Carlos' probation. Bree sabotages Edie's real estate business to exact revenge on her for kissing Orson. Edie learns that Danielle and Austin are Benjamin's biological parents and blackmails Bree, prompting Bree to confess the truth to her friends. Bree, Susan, Lynette, and Gabrielle sever ties with Edie, who then decides to leave Wisteria Lane to spend time with Travers. Lynette and Tom hire a family counselor, who encourages Lynette to spend time with Kayla to develop their mother–daughter bond. When Kayla threatens to hurt Penny, Lynette slaps Kayla, who in turn calls to tell the counselor that Lynette has been hitting her. Wayne discovers that Dylan is not his biological daughter and may not be the same girl he raised.
86	16	"The Gun Song"	Bethany Rooney	Bob Daily & Matt Berry	May 18, 2008	16.84
87	17	"Free"	David Grossman	Jeff Greenstein	May 18, 2008	16.84
Lynette, Bree, and Gabrielle meet Susan and Mike's newborn son, whom Mike wants to name Maynard after his recently deceased grandfather. Susan despises the name and secretly tries to change it to Connor, but eventually agrees to the name Maynard after Mike explains to her why he admired his grandfather. Bree pretends to be dating Reverend Green so that Orson stops stalking her, but later rejects Reverend Green's advances. As Reverend Green plans to publicly humiliate Bree, Orson confronts Reverend Green and tries to beat him up, but is knocked unconscious. Ellie confides in Gabrielle that she resorted to drug dealing due to a rough childhood. Gabrielle, having developed a strong bond with Ellie, tells her of the police's sting operation and instructs her to escape. Lynette is arrested by Child Protection Services for abusing Kayla, who aggravates the situation by burning herself with a curling iron to implicate Lynette. Tom forces Kayla to confess, before sending her off to live with her grandparents. Wayne kidnaps Adam to discover the truth about Dylan's biological father. Susan is dismayed when Julie announces she is leaving home for a summer internship before college. After brutally injuring Adam, Wayne holds Katherine hostage and demands to know what happened to his daughter. Gabrielle and Carlos find a large sum of money in Ellie's teddy bear; Ellie comes to retrieve it, but gets tailed by the police. Taking cover in Katherine's house, Ellie is shot dead by Wayne to provide him an alibi after he murders Katherine. Bree is forced to cater Bob and Lee's engagement party without Katherine, receiving help from Orson, who is determined to earn her forgiveness. While looking for Katherine, Bree is taken hostage by Wayne before Adam arrives in time to save both women. Katherine reveals that she adopted a Romanian orphan to replace the real Dylan, who died in an accident as a child. Katherine shoots Wayne dead when he threatens to ruin her life, but is not arrested as her friends convince the police that she acted in self-defense. Five years later, Gabrielle has two young daughters, Bree's business is extremely successful and she is still married to Orson, and Susan has a new love interest, having broken up with Mike.

== Ratings ==
=== United States ===
Episode number Production number	Title	Original airing	Rating	Share	18-49 (ratings)	Total viewers (in millions)	Rank per week
1; 4-01	Now You Know	September 30, 2007	12.2	18	7.5	19.317	#4
72; 4-02	Smiles of a Summer Night	October 7, 2007	11.7	17	6.8	17.817	#5
73; 4-03	The Game	October 14, 2007	11.8	18	7.4	18.892	#4
74; 4-04	If There's Anything I Can't Stand	October 21, 2007	11.5	17	7.3	18.214	#4
75; 4-05	Art Isn't Easy	October 28, 2007	11.8	17	7.2	18.280	#3
76; 4-06	Now I Know, Don't Be Scared	November 4, 2007	11.8	18	7.0	18.579	#6
77; 4-07	You Can't Judge a Book By Its Cover	November 11, 2007	11.9	18	7.2	18.632	#5
78; 4-08	Distant Past	November 25, 2007	11.6	17	7.0	18.638	#4
79; 4-09	Something's Coming	December 2, 2007	12.7	18	7.8	20.650	#4
80; 4-10	Welcome to Kanagawa	January 6, 2008	12.1	18	7.3	19.782	#5
81; 4-11	Sunday	April 13, 2008	10.1	15	5.9	16.371	#8
82; 4-12	In Buddy's Eyes	April 20, 2008	10.0	15	5.5	15.746	#2
83; 4-13	Hello, Little Girl	April 27, 2008	10.2	16	5.9	16.346	#5
84; 4-14	Opening Doors	May 4, 2008	10.8	17	6.3	16.757	#4
85; 4-15	Mother Said	May 11, 2008	9.7	15	5.6	15.427	#5
86; 4-16	The Gun Song	May 18, 2008	10.7	17	6.2	16.837	#6
87; 4-17	Free	May 18, 2008	10.7	17	6.2	16.837	#6

== International season debuts ==
Date	Country	Channel	Timeslot
September 30, 2007	USA	ABC	9:00 pm/8.00pmc
September 30, 2007	Canada	CTV	9:00 pm/8:00pmc
October 15, 2007	Poland	n (Poland)	Video on Demand
December 4, 2007	Turkey	CNBC-e (cable TV)	Tuesdays 9:00 pm
December 5, 2007	Italy	FOXlife (Sky Italia - SAT TV)	9:00 pm
January 7, 2008	Arab World	Showtime Arabia	9:00 pm
January 8, 2008	Ireland	RTÉ Two	9:50 pm
January 8, 2008	Portugal	Fox Life	9:00 pm
January 31, 2008	South Africa	M-Net	8:30 pm
February 4, 2008	New Zealand	TV 2	8:30 pm
February 11, 2008	Switzerland	SF2	8:00 pm
February 11, 2008	Austria	ORF1	9:00 pm
February 11, 2008	Australia	Seven	8:30 pm
February 13, 2008	Germany	Pro7	Wednesdays 8:15 pm
February 13, 2008	Latin America	Sony Entertainment Television	10:00 pm
February 14, 2008	Poland	FOXlife	9:00 pm
February 19, 2008	Norway	TV 2	9:45 pm
March 10, 2008	Finland	Nelonen	9:00 pm
March 25, 2008	Malaysia	8TV	10:30 pm
March 26, 2008; August 27, 2008	United Kingdom (excluding Wales)	Channel 4	10.00 pm - main UK showing See notes below.
March 27, 2008; August 27, 2008	United Kingdom (Wales)	S4C	2:20 am See notes below.
March 30, 2008	Israel	yes stars 1	9:15 pm
March 30, 2008; August 31, 2008	United Kingdom	E4	9.00 pm - repeat 10.00 pm - premiere UK showing See notes below.
April 2, 2008	Spain	La 2	Wednesdays 10:15 pm
April 25, 2008	Hungary	TV2	Wednesdays 10:15 pm
May 20, 2008	Mexico	TvAzteca	10:00 pm
September 16, 2008	Asia	Star World	11:00 pm
Fall 2008	Bulgaria	BTV	9:00 pm
October 2, 2008	Poland	Polsat (free-TV premiere)	10:05 pm
Fall 2008	Latvia	TV3	Mondays, 10:00 pm
Fall 2008	Lithuania	TV3	10:00 pm
October 14, 2008	Republic of Macedonia	A1 Televizija	Tuesday 9:00 pm
October 20, 2008	Singapore	Channel 5	10:00 pm
January 2009	Serbia	RTS	9:00 pm
August 28, 2008	France	Canal +	8:50 pm
February 2, 2009	Slovenia	POP TV	8:50 pm/11.15 pm
June 23, 2009	France	M6	8:45 pm

Note

The late season start in the United Kingdom was because of the strike. Channel 4 intended to begin showing season 4 in January, but it did not want to begin showing the season, only to have to take a break halfway through because of lack of episodes available.

Desperate Housewives was eventually forced to take a break because of Big Brother 9 in the summer. It was anticipated that Desperate Housewives would have finished by June, but this was not the case. Big Brother took up the 9 pm or 10 pm slot every day from June 5, 2008, until September 5, 2008, so there was not room for Desperate Housewives in the schedules. As there were still seven episodes left to show as of June, Channel 4 waited until Big Brother had finished to resume showing them. Episodes returned with "Sunday" on Wednesday, September 3 at the earlier time of 9:30 pm between two episodes of the Big Brother day 90 eviction.

As E4 is one episode ahead of Channel 4, but does not air the season premiere before the host channel, E4 did not begin airing the new season until four days later on March 30. Episodes after this were aired on E4 three days before the Channel 4 airing, with the exception of "Sunday", which was treated as a season premiere.

Desperate Housewives airs very late at night on Welsh channel S4C due to Welsh-language programming airing during prime-time.

== DVD release ==
Desperate Housewives: The Complete Fourth Season (Sizzling Secrets Edition)
Set details	Special features	
17 Episodes; 5-Disc Set; English (Dolby Digital 5.1 Surround); English SDH, Spanish & French subtitles; Audio Commentaries; Runtime: 729 minutes	Audio commentaries by creator Marc Cherry on 2 episodes: Now You Know - shared with executive producers Bob Daily & Jeff Greenstein; Mother Said - shared with actress Nicolette Sheridan & director David Warren; Getting Desperate, From Beginning To End: Step onto Wisteria Lane and discover how an episode of the show is made - from concept to completion.; Couples commentary - Check out the personalities behind the characters of your favorite couples on 5 episodes: Now I Know, Don't Be Scared - with Marcia Cross (Bree) & Kyle MacLachlan (Orson); A Distant Past - with Dana Delany (Katherine) & Nathan Fillion (Adam); Something's Coming - with Eva Longoria (Gaby) & Ricardo Chavira (Carlos); Welcome to Kanagawa - with Felicity Huffman (Lynette) & Doug Savant (Tom); Mother Said - with Teri Hatcher (Susan) & James Denton (Mike); Spare Time: Hanging With The Men Of Wisteria Lane; Cherry-Picked: Creator Marc Cherry's Favourite Scenes; Alternate Ending; Deleted Scenes; Optional audio commentaries by creator Marc Cherry on his favorite scenes, the alternate ending and the deleted scenes.; Bloopers	
DVD release dates
Region 1	Region 2	Region 4
September 2, 2008	November 3, 2008	TBA
