= Desperate Housewives Africa =

Nigerian television series

- Genre: Mystery; Comedy drama; Soap opera
- Created by: Marc Cherry
- Based on: Desperate Housewives by Marc Cherry
- Written by: Debo Oluwatuminu; Tari Ekiyor; Tosin Otudeko; Marc Cherry; Jason Ganzel; Jenna Bans; Joshua Senter; Dahvi Waller; Kevin Etten; Brian Tanen; Alexandra Cunningham; Bob Daily; John Pardee; Joey Murphy; Wendy Mericle; Matt Berry; Kevin Murphy; Tom Spezialy; Jeff Greenstein; Joe Keenan; Jamie Gorenberg; David Flebotte; Marco Pennette; David Schladweiler; Chuck Ranberg; Anne Flett-Giordano; Susan Nirah Jaffee; Chris Black; Lori Kirkland Baker; John Paul Bullock III; Cindy Appel; Christian McLaughlin; Peter Lefcourt; Jeffrey Richman; Jim Lincoln; Scott Sanford Tobis; Valerie Ahern; Brian A. Alexander; Patty Lin; Tracey Stern; Adam Barr; Alan Cross; Katie Ford; Ellen Herman; David Schulner; Oliver Goldstick; Sheila R. Lawrence; Valerie Brotski; Bruce Zimmerman; Sara Parriott; Josann McGibbon; Annie Weisman
- Screenplay by: Debo Oluwatunmi
- Directed by: Quinty Pillay
- Starring: Michelle Dede; Kehinde Bankole; Nini Wacera; Omotu Bissong; Joseph Benjamin; Marcy Dolapo Oni; Linda Osifo; Jason Nwoga; Femi Branch; Ben Touitou; Nonso Odogwu
- Narrated by: Marcy Dolapo Oni; See full list
- Theme music composer: Danny Elfman
- Composers: Steve Bartek; Stewart Copeland; Steve Jablonsky
- Country of origin: Nigeria
- Original language: English
- No. of series: 1
- No. of episodes: 23

Production
- Executive producer: Mo Abudu
- Producer: Quinty Pillay
- Production locations: Lekki, Lagos State; Wisteria Lane, Fairview, Eagle State (setting)
- Editors: Yemi Jolaoso; Abimbola Taiwo
- Camera setup: Multi-camera
- Running time: ~45 minutes
- Production company: ABC Studios

Original release
- Network: Ebonylife TV
- Release: 30 April – 29 October 2015

Related
- Desperate Housewives

Desperate Housewives Africa, also known as Desperate HWA, is a Nigerian comedy-drama-mystery television series Pan-African version of the American television series, Desperate Housewives created by Marc Cherry and produced by ABC Studios, that premiered on Ebony Life TV on 30 April 2015. The show features an ensemble cast, which includes: Joseph Benjamin, Kehinde Bankole, Omotu Bissong, Nini Wacera, Michelle Dede, Marcy Dolapo Oni and Linda Osifo.

The show was shot in Lekki. It is a Pan-African adaptation of the American series, Desperate Housewives, that aired from 2004 to 2012; the show has been minimally adapted to African themes; from character names to the main plot, but the main characters play the same roles as the characters in the original version.

== Plot ==
A look at the seemingly normal suburban lives of African women as they seek to live out their aspirations through their families, career and relationships, set in the middle-class development on Hibiscus Lane on the Lekki Peninsula in Lagos. It begins with the shocking suicide of Rume Bello (Mary Alice Young); a beautiful housewife, known for her warmth and generosity. In death, Rume delves into the lives of the friends she left behind – commenting from her now elevated perspective. Her intimate circle of friends who are confused by her death, are introduced. Tari Gambadia (Susan Mayer) who is divorced, single-mother looking for love; Funke Lawal (Lynette Scavo) a corporate high-achiever turned stay-at-home mum of four children who create a huge scene at Rume Bello's wake seriously embarrassing her; Ese De Souza (Bree Van de Kamp), a devout and perfectly groomed housewife and mother of two teenagers, who is dealing with the outcome of her family's rejection of her façade and standards; Kiki Obi (Gabrielle Solis), ex Nollywood actress and trophy wife whose marriage to the rising movie financier Chuka Obi (Carlos Solis) fails to satisfy her deepest needs, and she turns to her personal trainer, Tai Etim (John Rowland) to alleviate her boredom. We are also introduced to the neighbours on the Lane including Rhetta Moore (Edie Britt) a twice-divorced real estate broker with a voracious sexual appetite, who aggressively competes with Tari for the affections of handsome newcomer, Larry Izama (Mike Delfino) who we later discover came to Hibiscus Lane with a hidden agenda. Tensions rise as Kay De Souza (Rex Van de Kamp) asks his wife Ese for a divorce, Chuka Obi treats his wife Kiki like she is on his payroll, Shina Lawal (Tom Scavo) is oblivious to his wife's frustration and growing desperation, and Deji Bello (Paul Young), Rume's now widowed husband, seems to express his grief by suspiciously digging up his garden. Rume narrates the series from her vantage point, giving an insight into the lives, mysteries and conflicts of these four intriguing women.

== Cast ==
- Michelle Dede as Tari Gambadia
- Omotu Bissong as Funke Lawal
- Nini Wacera as Ese De Souza
- Kehinde Bankole as Kiki Obi
- Linda Osifo as Rhetta Moore
- Mercy Dolapo Oni as Rume Bello
- Nonso Odogwu as Kayonde De Souza
- Femi Branch as Deji Bello
- Joseph Benjamin as Chuka Obi
- Jason Dwoga as Larry Izama
- Susan Pwajok as Aisha Gambandia
- Ben Touitou as Tai Etim
- Ifeanyi Dike, Jr as Leo De Souza
- Ozzy Agu as Shina Lawal
- Omolara Akinsola as Esther Benson
- Moyosore Okisola as Tobi Lawal
- Emmanuel Osawaru as Tope Lawal
- Imolejesu Noah as Tola Lawal
- Esther Ubong-Abasi as Katherine De Souza
- Shaffy Bello as Agnes Bassey
- Blossom Chukwujekwu as Lekan Phillips
- Carol King as Abike Haastrup
- Lemmi Ilemona Adejo as Solomon Haastrup
- Katung Musa Aduwak as Dunlandi Gambadia
- Samuel Robinson as Akin Bello
- Tina Mba as Furo George
- Amaka Anioji as Nnena Okafor
- Ayo Liyado as Father Ajayi
- Nicole Vervelde Keza as Amanda
- Faith Emmanuel as Bose
- Gregory Ojefua as Private Investigator

== Production ==
Auditions for various roles were announced in December 2013. Mo Abudu the CEO and executive producer led the production. Directed by Quinty Pillay, the cast members were mainly from Nigeria. In accordance with the new setting, the names of the characters in the original show were changed to African names. Michelle Dede plays Tari Gambadia(Susan Mayer), Nini Wacera plays Ese De Souza, the adapted version of Bree Van de Kamp, Kehinde Bankole plays Kiki Obi (Gabrielle Solis). Omotu Bissong plays Funke Lawal(Lynette Scavo), Mercy Dolapo Oni plays Rume Bello(Mary Alice Young) and Linda Osifo plays Rhetta Moore(Edie Britt). Joseph Benjamin plays Chuka Obi, the African version of Carlos Solis, Jason Dwoga plays Larry Izama(Mike Delfino), Femi Branch plays Deji Bello(Paul Young), Ben Touitou plays Tai Etim(John Rowland), Ozzy Agu plays Shina Lawal(Tom Scavo) and Samuel Robinson plays Akin Bello(Zach Young) .

On July 30, 2015, the show went for a production break in order to replenish the remaining nine episodes. It resumed on September 3, 2015, from the fifteenth episode.

== Broadcast ==
Desperate Housewives Africa premiered across the African continent and beyond on Ebony Life Television that is available on Multichoice dish, DSTV Channel 165 on 30 April 2015.

== General Manager ==
- Giovanni Mastrangelo

== Created by ==
- Marc Cherry

== Created and written by ==
- Marc Cherry

== Written By ==
- Marc Cherry
- Jason Ganzel
- Jenna Bans
- Joshua Senter
- Dahvi Waller
- Kevin Etten
- Brian Tanen
- Alexandra Cunningham
- Bob Daily
- John Pardee
- Joey Murphy
- Wendy Mericle
- Matt Berry
- Kevin Murphy
- Tom Spezialy
- Jeff Greenstein
- Joe Keenan
- Jamie Gorenberg
- David Flebotte
- Marco Pennette
- David Schladweiler
- Chuck Ranberg
- Anne Flett-Giordano
- Susan Nirah Jaffee
- Chris Black
- Lori Kirkland Baker
- John Paul Bullock III
- Cindy Appel
- Christian McLaughlin
- Peter Lefcourt
- Jeffrey Richman
- Jim Lincoln
- Scott Sanford Tobis
- Valerie Ahern
- Brian A. Alexander
- Patty Lin
- Tracey Stern
- Adam Barr
- Alan Cross
- Katie Ford
- Ellen Herman
- David Schulner
- Oliver Goldstick
- Sheila R. Lawrence
- Valerie Brotski
- Bruce Zimmerman
- Sara Parriott
- Josann McGibbon
- Annie Weisman

== Episodes ==
| No. | Title | Directed by | Written by | Original release date |
|---|---|---|---|---|
| 1 | "Pilot" | Quinty Pillay | Tari Ekiyor | 30 April 2015 |
It all begins with the shocking suicide of Rume Bello, a beautiful housewife known for her warmth and generosity. In death, Rume delves into and comments on the lives of the friends she left behind from her now elevated perspective. Her intimate circle of friends who are confused by her death are introduced: Tari Gambadia—a divorced single-mother looking for love; Funke Lawal, a corporate high-achiever turned stay-at-home mum of four children who create a huge scene at Rume Bello's wake seriously embarrassing her; Ese De Souza, a devout and perfectly groomed housewife and mother of two teenagers who is dealing with the outcome of her family's rejection of her façade and standards; Kiki Obi, a glamorous former Nollywood actress turned trophy wife whose marriage to rising movie financier Chuka Obi fails to satisfy her deepest needs, leading her to turn to her personal trainer Tai Etim for fulfillment. Rume narrates the series from her vantage point, giving an insight into the lives, mysteries and conflicts of these four intriguing women.
| 2 | "Ah, But Underneath" | Quinty Pillay | Debo Oluwatuminu | 7 May 2015 |
The ladies on Hibiscus Lane try to understand what could have led their friend to commit suicide – especially after finding a disturbing blackmail note in her belongings. Kiki continues her dangerous affair with Tai Etim and almost gets caught in the act by Chuka when he arrives home from work early. Funke is presented with an extreme disciplinary option by her neighbour Mrs Benson, but struggles with the idea of adopting it. Ese and Kay agree to go for marriage counselling with the head of their local parish, Father Ajayi, resulting in insightful revelations for all of them. Meanwhile, Tari plucks up the courage to ask Larry Izama for a date, but is upstaged by Rhetta Moore's more brazen approach.
| 3 | "Pretty Little Picture" | Quinty Pillay | Tosin Otudeko | 14 May 2015 |
The ladies agree to host a dinner in honour of their friend Rume. Deji Bello's son Akin begins to wonder as his father refuses to grieve or even speak about his mother. Kiki unexpectedly finds herself blackmailed by Mrs. Benson's ill-fated housemaid Bose after the latter sees her and Tai together. Ese goes to great lengths to try to hide the fact that she and Kay are having problems in their marriage. An attempt by Tari to put her angst with ex-husband Dunladi to rest results in her accidentally locking herself outside naked on Hibiscus Lane, leading to Larry coming to an awkward rescue. Later, suspecting that Rhetta has invited Larry over, she sneaks into her house and ends up accidentally starting a house fire.
| 4 | "Who is that Woman?" | Quinty Pillay | Tari Ekiyor | 21 May 2015 |
After Mrs Benson discovers that Tari is interested in Larry, she realises that it was she who burnt Rhetta's house down and blackmails her into subsidising her bills. Wanting to comfort herself with Larry, Rhetta meanwhile ups the ante with a swimsuit-clad car wash routine in front of him. Chuka begins to suspect Kiki is having an affair but jumps to the wrong conclusion about the culprit, leading to him assaulting an innocent man. Funke struggles with giving her kids medication for Attention Deficit Disorder (ADD), while Ese struggles with Leo's difficult behaviour when Kay decides to move out. Meanwhile, the ladies get information that begins to shed more light on Rume's mysterious suicide. They share their findings with Deji, who hires a Private Detective to find out who the blackmailer is.
| 5 | "Come In, Stranger" | Quinty Pillay | Tari Ekiyor | 28 May 2015 |
A break-in in the Estate leads to more vigilance and awareness by the residents. They don't realise the intruder lives closer than they think. Tari accepts the offer of a date from Estate Head of Security Patrick Esosa when Larry appears aloof and distant towards her in an attempt to provoke him to jealousy, but he has something else entirely on his mind. Kiki's mother-in-law Mama Obi arrives to spend time with her son and daughter-in-law; it turns out that Chuka has brought her in to find out if Kiki is really having an affair. Funke and Shina try to get their children into a prestigious private school at all costs. Ese invites Akin to her house for lunch seeing they share something in common–loneliness. Their time spent together leads to some surprising revelations.
| 6 | "Running to Stand Still" | Quinty Pillay | Debo Oluwatuminu | 4 June 2015 |
The housewives talk about the sudden absence of Akin, who is eventually revealed to be in a mental care unit. Kiki takes offense when Chuka agrees with Mama Obi's suggestion that he should give her a grandchild. In order to spend some time with Tai, she uses her mother-in-law's gambling problem to her advantage. Father Ajayi discusses Kay's suggestion to spice up their sex life, much to Ese's annoyance. Funke engages in a war of words with another mother, Faith Radcliffe, over a school play and learns an alternate use of her children's ADD medicine. Tari finds out where Akin is and persuades Aisha to speak to him and sneak him a mobile phone.
| 7 | "Anything You Can Do" | Quinty Pillay | Tosin Otudeko | 11 June 2015 |
A dressed-up and very attractive Tari is disappointed and embarrassed when Larry has to cancel their first proper date because a very sexy guest called Francesca comes over to stay. Funke becomes increasingly addicted to and dependent on her children's ADD medication, and sabotages Shina's promotion. Kay informs Ese he's filed for divorce, and attempts to bribe the children with gifts forcing Ese to take drastic action. The private investigator comes closer to solving the mystery of the blackmail note and bringing Deji and Akin closure. After Kiki carelessly invites Tai over, Mama Obi finally catches them in the act, only for her triumph to be cut short by an intoxicated Leo running her over in the street outside.
| 8 | "Guilty" | Quinty Pillay | Tari Ekiyor | 18 June 2015 |
In the aftermath of Mama Obi's hit and run, the residents of Hibiscus Lane reevaluate their lives. Kay and Ese, on discovering that Leo is responsible for putting Mama Obi in a coma, take the damaged car to a rough area of Lagos to get it fixed and conceal evidence of his crime. Meanwhile, Tari becomes suspicious about Larry's real reason for being on the Lane when she discovers a bag of money concealed in his kitchen cupboard. Larry discovers Tari's prying and their relationship stalls. Funke's desperation intensifies as she searches for a way to manage her addiction to her children's ADD medication. A guilt-ridden Tai confesses to his priest about his affair with Kiki. Chuka openly voices his newfound desire to start a family, only for Kiki to bluntly inform him that her womb is not up for negotiation. The private investigator is about to murder Rhetta when he discovers that it was actually Mrs. Benson who blackmailed Rume. Tari and Larry make up by sleeping together for the first time, while Deji confronts and kills Mrs. Benson who callously refuses partial culpability in Rume's suicide.
| 9 | "Suspicious Minds" | Quinty Pillay | Tari Ekiyor | 25 June 2015 |
Challenged by a nurse's dedicated and compassionate care for the comatose Mama Obi, Kiki decides to organise a fashion show with the women on the Estate as a fundraiser for people who can't afford medical care. Kay and a frustrated Ese try their best to provoke some remorse in a seemingly sociopathic Leo. Tari discovers Kiki is having an affair with Tai and becomes very upset with her. Tai's mother Abigail discovers that her son is sleeping with a housewife and, assuming it's Tari, publicly humiliates her at the fashion show, forcing Kiki to confess the truth to Abigail. Funke makes use of her business expertise to "poach" herself a new nanny. With her secret now spoiled, Kiki ponders coming clean about her affair, but is interrupted when Chuka is arrested by the fictional Financial Crimes Agency (FCA) for money laundering, but claims he's been set up by his business partner Alhaji.
| 10 | "Come Back To Me" | Quinty Pillay | Tosin Otudeko | 2 July 2015 |
Faith Radcliffe the society mum reveals her alter ego as a high-class prostitute, and Ese finds out Kay is one of her customers after he has a heart attack. Kiki tries to deal with her sudden cash-strapped financial situation with Chuka in jail, sending her belongings to her mother for safekeeping and out of the reach of the FCA. While Tari and Larry try to plan a romantic date together, they discover that Aisha has been harbouring the missing Akin all along, much to Tari's disappointment. Funke is concerned about her new nanny Claire Orode's ability to handle her children, and installs a secret camera to spy on her. Tari sends Akin back to his father, upsetting Aisha in the process.
| 11 | "Move on" | Quinty Pillay | Tari Ekiyor | 9 July 2015 |
Larry tells Tari that he loves her but she is short of words. Danladi reveals that Halima has left him, and gets invited for Aisha's birthday out of sympathy. He brings Rhetta as his date; she later confesses to Tari that she had a fling with Danladi while they were married. Danladi tries to win Tari back, but she realises that she loves Larry after all. Ese is "emotionally blackmailed" by her children to nurse Kay back to health. Ese begins a flirty dalliance with the local pharmacist, Lekan Phillips, much to Kay's chagrin. Leo accuses her of being heartless, and she lets it slip that Kay cheated. While secretly going through Chuka's papers, Kiki finds out that he willingly went along with the money laundring scheme, sowing new seeds of mistrust between them. As her finances continue to dwindle, she seeks acting opportunities for money and is given a role in a small indie movie, where she realises that her glory days are well and truly over.
| 12 | "Everyday and a Little Death" | Quinty Pillay | Debo Oluwatuminu | 16 July 2015 |
The body of Mrs. Benson is found, attracting the kind of publicity she's always craved. Rhetta tries to organise a memorial for her at her graveside, but only a guilt-ridden Tari agrees to go. Ese continues to torment Kay by continuing to flirt with Lekan. Chuka is placed under house arrest under the watchful eye of a police officer and as he can no longer work, Kiki is displeased to discover that she now has to find work herself in less paying commercial gigs that are humiliating. Worse yet, he hasn't given up on having children. Unimpressed with his chauvinistic attitude, she taunts him by eating his dinner outside the house. Upon discovering Mrs. Benson left a journal, Tari confesses to Rhetta that she accidentally burnt down her house, leading to a confrontation at Mrs. Benson's gravesite. While cleaning and admiring a Dane gun that Lekan gives her as a present, Ese ends up accidentally shooting off his toe as he attempts to kiss her. An attempt by Funke to get into an exercise class ends up going awry. Chuka makes Kiki promise to remain with him if he goes to prison, leading to a reconciliation of sorts.
| 13 | "Your Fault" | Quinty Pillay | Tosin Otudeko | 23 July 2015 |
Shina's father Adeolu comes to visit the Lawal's. Funke confronts her father in-law when she discovers that he's a serial cheater as well as a chauvinist. Tai's parents threaten Kiki into trying to convince Tai that his sudden decision to start his own business is misguided, he in turn surprises her by proposing marriage, which she declines. Meanwhile, Deji works hard to convince Tari there isn't any mystery surrounding Rume's death. Ese enjoys Lekan's company and advice as she deals with her feelings about the divorce from Kay, who has a change of heart when he realises Ese is spending time in the company of another man. Tari keeps a watchful eye on her daughter after she discovers Aisha and Akin in an embrace. Deji decides to sell the house, but has a change of heart when Akin, armed with the family secret, insists all plans to move house be abandoned.
| 14 | "Love is in the Air" | Quinty Pillay | Tari Ekiyor | 30 July 2015 |
Ese confides to Father Ajayi that she still believes Kay is being evasive about his sexual preferences, even though they have reconciled. She later probes Kay to tell her what his secret is, and he admits that he enjoys certain so-called sexual adventures. Much to his delight, Ese agrees to experiment together. Kiki is forced to swallow her pride after her diva attitude gets her fired from her acting job and her credit card gets declined at her favourite beauty salon, and she volunteers there as a beautician. Funke's pleasant surprise when her boys give her a beautiful flowerpot turns unpleasant when she finds out that they stole it from cantankerous neighbour Liz Okorie. The tension between Funke and Mrs. Okorie escalates when she accuses the children of also stealing her wall clock and calls them names. Shina discovers a treasure trove of stolen things in the children's playhouse, including the clock.
| 15 | "Impossible" | Debo Oluwatuminu | Unknown | 3 September 2015 |
The police arrest Larry for the murder of Mrs Benson because of a bracelet that was planted on him. Tari, remembering they were together on the evening of the murder provides an alibi for him when she is questioned. But her delight at his innocence turns to despair when she finds out he has a criminal record, and promptly breaks up with him. Tai's flatmate Ayo attempts to blackmail Kiki into sleeping with him and gets a slap for his efforts. Shina gets Patrick Obey's job as a director but Funke's unhappy because he'll be away more than he already is. After finding an errant condom in the laundry, Ese discovers that it belongs to Katherine who was planning on losing her virginity to Tai, a huge disappointment for Ese's matchmaking plans. At Deji's house, Leo causes some serious trouble by pranking a teenager into drinking too much and vomiting all over the furniture.
| 16 | "The Ladies Who Lunch" | Quinty Pillay | Tosin Otudeko | 10 September 2015 |
A scandal on the Lane exposes more than Ese anticipated as Faith Radcliffe's exploits are plastered all over tabloid news. Ese attempts to persuade Faith to omit Kay's name from her list of customers, but the encounter goes badly. Kiki has a brilliant idea that temporarily solves an inconvenient plumbing problem in the Obi household. Funke struggles to deal with the suspicion that her boys were the source of a ringworm infection in their school, only to confront the mother of the real culprit when she finds out the truth.
| 17 | "There Won't Be Trumpets" | Quinty Pillay | Tari Ekiyor | 17 September 2015 |
Mama Obi finally awakens from her coma, but suffers an accident and dies while trying to reveal Kiki's affair with Tai. Kiki takes objection to Chuka giving his mother an expensive funeral. When later offered a settlement by the hospital for negligence on their part, she decides to keep it to herself as he enters a plea agreement requiring him to spend six months in prison. Funke befriends a deaf woman named Labake Harris whose daughter attends Park Royal Academy with her children, but is infuriated by her husband Deinde, who takes advantage of her disability in order to insult her behind her back. Leo's behaviour worsens to the degree that Ese and Kay decide to send him away to Ese's disciplinarian aunt May for a while, infuriating him in the process. Tari is being asked out by Rhetta's new architect, but Rhetta forbids her from dating him. Larry tries to explain his past by giving Tari a confession letter, which she hesitates to read.
| 18 | "Children Will Listen" | Quinty Pillay | Debo Oluwatuminu | 24 September 2015 |
With money in the bank and Chuka preparing to serve his prison sentence, Kiki has no reason to contemplate motherhood-or so she thinks. Unbeknownst to her, their sex life is now unprotected as he in desperation for fatherhood secretly tampers with her birth control pills. Tari suddenly finds the mother-daughter relationship turned on its head when her eccentric mother Furo George visits her daughter on Hibiscus Lane after she and her partner Pascal break up. A group of playing boys find the wooden box that Deji threw into the Lagoon with a body in it. Akin defends his father when detectives question him about a similar wooden chest he purchased years ago. The tension between Kiki and Chuka reaches breaking point when he finds out from a visiting lawyer about the settlement from the hospital. To keep her in check, he physically forces her to sign a legal document that would cut her off from any entitlements if she leaves him. Hurt, she runs back into the willing arms of Tai. Funke and Ese fall out when Funke discovers Ese spanked Tope whilst babysitting them, leaving Ese doubting her capabilities as a mother. She and Kay decide to visit Leo together at Aunty May's house. Meanwhile, Agnes reveals the secrets of Akin's past to him and he discovers that his birth name was "Ify".
| 19 | "Live Alone and Like It" | Quinty Pillay | Tosin Otudeko | 1 October 2015 |
When Mrs. Okorie collapses on the lane from a suspected heart attack, Funke comes to her aid and the two of them begin an uneasy relationship. Mrs. Okorie becomes more attached to Funke than she'd like, and she starts to regret her intervention. Ese continues to have difficulty with Leo after he returns home from Aunty May. At Ese's suggestion, Leo sees their pastor to whom he reveals his aversion for his mother. Larry learns from Chief Molokwu that the body in the wooden box is that of his former girlfriend Gina. The battle of the Obis continues as Kiki refuses to have sex with Chuka unless he destroys the legal document and reignites her relationship with Tai when he in turn cuts off her access to funds. Furo George attempts to cheer Tari up by getting them dates so she can get over the breakup with Larry, who is meanwhile beaten up by a corrupt detective. After Kiki charms an older man into paying a restaurant bill for her, Chuka gives in and destroys the document, and a happier Kiki lets him back into bed.
| 20 | "Fear No More" | Quinty Pillay | Debo Oluwatumini | 8 October 2015 |
Wishing to keep up appearances, Kiki organises a 'going away' party for Chuka as he is actually about to go to prison. But her mood turns from festive to furious when she discovers that she is pregnant and her birth control pills have been tampered with, and she accuses him in front of all the guests. Lekan Philips returns and attempts to woo Ese away from Kay, while Ese remains oblivious to Lekan's suspicious agenda. Funke's nemesis, Amarachi returns and is working closely with Shina. A jealous and threatened Funke turns to Rhetta for advice. Akin starts to stalk Aisha to try to restore their friendship. Rhetta exposes Tari to Deji about breaking into his house, forcing Deji to tell Tari an unconvincing lie about Rume's past. Tari's kitchen is set on fire, and she assumes Deji is responsible. Larry decides to investigate Deji when he finds out he owned a similar wooden box, and warns Tari to stay away from him.
| 21 | "Sunday in the Park with George" | Quinty Pillay | Tosin Otudeko | 15 October 2015 |
Rhetta catches Ese and Lekan in their clandestine pursuits, and Kai meets with to clear the air and justify the outings. A knowing Rhetta confronts her with the charge that Ese's being emotionally unfaithful. Meanwhile, Kay's health deteriorates as Lekan secretly tampers with his heart medication. Funke, afraid that her sex life is suffering because of home and work life pressures, tries to spice it up with attempts at roleplay. Tari unwittingly hires Deji's private investigator to investigate Deji, and she also learns from Gina's sister Francesca that Larry killed a man who attempted to rape Gina in self-defense, and she decides to forgive him. Kiki confronts Chuka about her tampered-with birth control pills, and he promptly blames his dead mother. Tai almost passes out when Kiki informs him she is pregnant and he might be the father. Tari's relieved when Pascal proposes to Furo and leaves with her. Meanwhile, Agnes plans to force Deji off the lane and to tell Akin everything about his family.
| 22 | "Goodbye for Now" | Quinty Pillay | Debo Oluwatumini | 22 October 2015 |
In the penultimate episode, a jealous Rhetta connives to stage an intervention for Tari when she learns that Larry is moving in with her, but Tari makes a persuasive moving statement that reassures the women. Funke plots to keep Shina and Amarachi apart, but ends up getting Shina fired. Chuka finds himself in ever deeper trouble after a letter from the pharmacy reveals that it was he who ordered the fake birth control pills. Lekan breaks into Ese's house, and lies to Ese about Kay flaunting their 'unusual' sex practices to his colleagues. An enraged Ese confronts Kay who strenuously denies the allegations, but ends up having another heart attack.
| 23 | "One Wonderful Day" | Quinty Pillay | Tosin Otudeko | 29 October 2015 |
Shina discovers through his boss that Funke was responsible for losing the original promotion and decides to become a house-husband. After Chuka is arrested on assault charges, Kiki decides the baby needs a father and agrees to testify in court on his behalf on the condition that he takes his full responsibility. Tai shocks Chuka by revealing that the baby might be his, resulting in Chuka attempting violence once more. Rhetta welcomes the enigmatic Hastrup's to the lane, while Akin holds Tari prisoner at gunpoint, keen to find Larry, who he believes wants to do his father harm. Larry has taken Deji to a deserted place with every intention of killing him after interrogating him. Kay starts to believe that Ese may have been responsible for poisoning him, and writes her a note forgiving her, then dies not long after.
