= Desperate Housewives season 3 =

Desperate Housewives
- Season 3
- Season 3 DVD cover of 'Desperate Housewives'
- Starring: Teri Hatcher; Felicity Huffman; Marcia Cross; Eva Longoria; Nicollette Sheridan; Ricardo Antonio Chavira; Andrea Bowen; Doug Savant; Kyle MacLachlan; Brenda Strong; James Denton
- No. of episodes: 23

Release
- Original network: ABC
- Original release: September 24, 2006 – May 20, 2007

Season chronology
- ← Previous; Season 2 Next → Season 4

The third season of the American dramedy-mystery television series Desperate Housewives commenced airing on ABC in the United States on September 24, 2006, and concluded on May 20, 2007. The season continues the story of the Wisteria Lane residents, describing their lives in the suburban neighborhood, while dealing with the arrival of the mysterious Orson Hodge. The season follows the lives and events of Susan Mayer, Lynette Scavo, Bree Van De Kamp, Gabrielle Solis and Edie Britt. Broadcast in the Sunday night timeslot at 9:00 ET, the season aired twenty-three regular episodes. In addition, two clip shows were produced for the season, in order to put the previous events of the show in perspective. "The Juciest Bites" aired before the seventeenth episode, detailing the events of the first three seasons, in order to introduce the new story arcs in the end of the season. "Secrets and Lies" was narrated by Brenda Strong and was the last clip show to be produced for the series, airing before the inception of the fourth season.

The season received critical acclaim, most critics noting an improvement in the writing after the unsuccessful second season. The production team and the cast members received positive critical response, resulting in numerous awards and nominations. This season also aired the first "disaster episode" of the series, "Bang", which saw the main characters dealing with a shooting in a local supermarket. Despite numerous complaints about scheduling in the previous seasons, Desperate Housewives was one of the few ABC series to keep its original time slot. The highest-rated episode of the season was the season premiere, watched by 24.09 million viewers with an 8.5 rating, ranking second in the week. Buena Vista Home Entertainment officially released the season on DVD in the United States and Canada on September 4, 2007.

== Production ==
Marc Cherry returned as the series' showrunner and executive producer. After leaving the episodic writing to his staff during the second season, he returned as a writer as well. Michael Edelstein and Tom Spezialy, who served as executive producers for seasons one and two, did not return for the series' third season due to creative differences. They were replaced by Kevin Murphy and George W. Perkins, both of whom had previously served as co-executive producers in earlier seasons. John Pardee, Joey Murphy, and Chris Black continued to serve as co-executive producers. Larry Shaw and David Grossman, both of whom previously served as producers and directors for the series, were promoted to co-executive producers, with Bob Daily rounding out the team. All but Black, Grossman, Perkins, and Shaw also served as writers for the third season. Alexandra Cunningham, Jenna Bans, Kevin Etten, Josh Senter, and Dahvi Waller returned to the writing staff and were joined by Susan Nirah Jaffee, Brian A. Alexander, Christian McLaughlin, Valerie Ahern, and Jeff Greenstein. Bans and Etten also served as story editors. Shaw and Grossman continued to direct episodes, as did Wendey Stanzler. New directors for the third season included David Warren, Sanaa Hamri, and Matthew Diamond.

Cherry's decision to advance the storylines by six months for the third-season premiere came as a response to the series' problematic second season. Cherry stated that he regretted most of the second season, as scheduling problems made it difficult to plan the season's storylines. "One of the problems I had with season two was that I had to keep going with the previous year's stuff," he explained that he learned he had to go back to square one to build up the tension again, expressing his own disappointment in the development of the second season. The cast also expressed disappointment in the second season; James Denton considered leaving the show and Marcia Cross confessed "I've been at Marc's door plenty of times with script complaints, going 'You've got to be kidding.'" Cherry stated that the six-month time jump would help the storylines develop quicker, as the second season's storylines lagged. He added: "And I'm going to work much harder to criss-cross all the women's stories so that their lives bump up against each other." To help refresh the show, several new writers were hired, including Greenstein, Joe Keenan, who also served as an executive producer, and Bob Daily, who was also a producer. Daily commented, "When we came on in season three, the mandate was to bring the show back to its roots. That meant having plotlines spring from relatable experiences, no matter how operatic or convoluted." For the season's main mystery, Cherry and the writers wanted to incorporate more of the series' regular characters rather than bringing in various new ones, like they had done in the second season with Betty Applewhite (Alfre Woodard) and her family. They developed the Orson plot line around the "idea that one of our women marries a guy who has dark secrets and possibly a violent streak." Cherry opined: "I thought there was something exciting about that, but real and relatable." Greenstein commented that the writers worked backwards from the second season's cliffhangers to develop the Orson storyline, forsaking the original material that had been developed earlier. The cast responded positively to the new material for the season.

The season is the first to feature Kyle MacLachlan as a series regular. He originally appeared as Orson Hodge in a string of episodes at the end of the second season. The Orson character was originally planned as a romantic interest for Susan, according to executive producer Tom Spezialy, until Cherry decided to pair Orson with Bree. Additionally, when Orson was introduced toward the end of the second season, he was originally to be a con artist. A character portrayed by Julie White appeared in the second-season finale and would have been Orson's accomplice, but the entire storyline was discarded in favor of the mysterious disappearance of Orson's wife and White's character was not seen or mentioned again. MacLachlan commented that his character is "desperate to make this relationship with Bree work. Anything that tries to knock that apart becomes a threat." Cherry called Orson Bree's perfect match, but added that their similarities "will ultimately prove to be the downfall of the relationship." Kiersten Warren also returned to the series as Nora Huntington after being introduced at the end of the second season. On her storyline, Warren commented, "There's a lot of families who are going through this. Not quite the surprise ooh, boo, child, but children from other marriages and trying to meld these families. I think a lot of people have to deal with it. I think it's fantastic that they're doing this on the show." Dougray Scott made his debut in the season premiere as Ian Hainsworth, Susan's romantic interest. Cherry opined that the character "can legitimately rival Mike for [Susan's] affections." Daily commented on the storyline, saying: "Talk about dark comedy — we're trying to find the humor in these two people bonding over the fact that they each have a partner in a coma." Scott called his character "bumbling at times," adding, "He kind of blossoms after he rediscovers his romantic juices with Susan."

== Cast ==
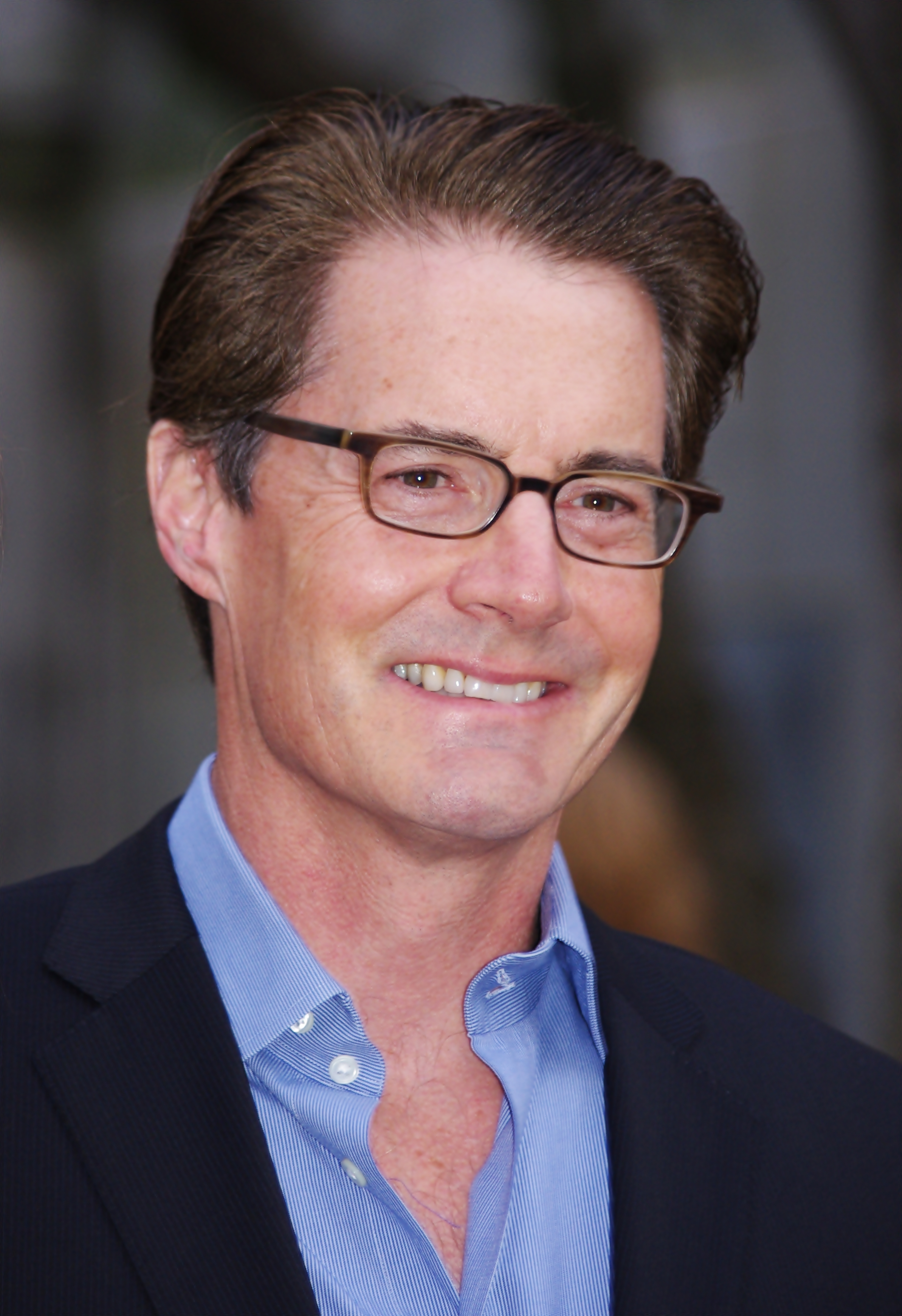
MacLachlan's character was the subject of the season's main mystery.

The third season had eleven roles receiving star billing, with ten of them returning from the previous season, out of whom nine were part of the first season's main cast. The series is narrated by Brenda Strong, who portrays the deceased Mary Alice Young, as she observes from beyond the grave, the lives of the Wisteria Lane residents and her former best friends. Susan Mayer, portrayed by Teri Hatcher, is a divorcée and single mother, who is in a continuous search for a stable relationship. Felicity Huffman portrayed Lynette Scavo, devoted wife and mother of four, in desperate need to get some time for herself. Marcia Cross portrayed Bree Hodge, widow and mother of two, struggling to be perfect in every aspect. Former model Gabrielle Solis, portrayed by Eva Longoria, has to deal with her upcoming motherhood and an unexpected divorce. Nicollette Sheridan portrayed Edie Britt, whose numerous short-term relationships have made her an iconic character. Ricardo Antonio Chavira played Carlos Solis, a rich businessman and Gabrielle's husband, whose affair with his daughter's surrogate mother eventually led to divorce. Andrea Bowen acted as Julie Mayer, the responsible and caring daughter of Susan, whose close relationship to her mother have made her more mature. Doug Savant portrayed Tom Scavo, Lynette's husband, who is trying to welcome his illegitimate daughter among the family he has with his wife. Mike Delfino, now suffering from amnesia following a hit and run, was played by James Denton. Previously a recurring character throughout the last episodes of the previous season, Orson Hodge, portrayed by Kyle MacLachlan, was conceived as a new love interest for Bree, whose mysterious arc is the season's main storyline.

Receiving "also starring" billing were Shawn Pyfrom, portraying Bree's homosexual son Andrew Van de Kamp, Joy Lauren in the role of Danielle Van de Kamp, Bree's irresponsible and rebel daughter, Josh Henderson, portraying Austin McCann, Edie's nephew who begins a relationship with Julie, and Brent Kinsman, Shane Kinsman and Zane Huett, playing Preston Scavo, Porter Scavo and Parker Scavo, Lynette's troublesome children.

Numerous supporting characters have been given expansive and recurring arcs in the progressive storyline. Kathryn Joosten continued her recurring role of neighbor Karen McCluskey, omnipresent in the lives of the Wisteria Lane residents. Pat Crawford Brown portrayed neighbor Ida Greenberg, whereas Jake Cherry appeared in several episodes portraying Travers McLain, Edie's son. Despite having had numerous appearances in the first seasons, Richard Burgi only appeared in one episode in this season, portraying Karl Mayer. Deceased since the first-season finale, Rex Van de Kamp, portrayed by Steven Culp, provided his voice for sixteenth episode, taking over the narration. Part of Lynette's storyline was Nora Huntington, portrayed by Kiersten Warren, portraying the woman Tom had an affair with before meeting Lynette. The affair resulted in Nora getting pregnant with Kayla, now an eleven-year-old, portrayed by Rachel G. Fox. Jason Gedrick portrayed Rick Coletti, who would become a potential love interest for Lynette. Cody Kasch reappeared as Zach Young in a recurring character capacity, following two seasons as a series regular. Mark Moses returned to the series as Paul Young, this time a fellow prisoner of Mike Delfino's, who is trying to win his friendship in order to determine him to get money from his son, Zach. Jesse Metcalfe returned after a year-long absence, portraying John Rowland, Gabrielle's former lover, who is now preparing for an upcoming marriage. Victor Lang, portrayed by John Slattery, immediately becomes a love interest for Gabrielle, following his first appearance in the season's sixteenth episode. Gwendoline Yeo acted as Xiao-Mei, the surrogate mother of Gabrielle and Carlos' child, but is never seen or heard of after it is revealed that the baby she was carrying wasn't the Solises'. Ian Hainsworth, portrayed by Dougray Scott was Susan's main love interest this season, creating a love triangle between the two of them and Mike. Matt Roth played Art Shepherd, a supposed pedophile who temporarily moves to Wisteria Lane. Dakin Matthews appeared as Reverend Sykes, reverend at the local Presbyterian church. Part of the main mystery arc, was Gloria Hodge, played by Dixie Carter, Orson's mother with an inexplicable repugnance towards her son. Alma Hodge, Orson's first wife, who comes on Wisteria Lane seeking reconciliation, was portrayed by Valerie Mahaffey, whereas Carolyn Bigsby, a mysterious woman whose main goal is destroying Orson and Bree's marriage, was portrayed by Laurie Metcalf.

== Reception ==
=== Critical response ===
Unlike the second season's opener, which started that illadvised business in the basement and kept the women largely separated, this year's kickoff script, by series creator Marc Cherry and Jeff Greenstein, does everything right.

— David Bianculli, New York Daily News

David Kronke of the Los Angeles Daily News wrote that the show "returns to its wicked wit, dialing back but certainly not eradicating the melodrama." He complimented the four main actresses for their comedic relief and concluded: "Rarely does a show unjump the shark this well; it's back in fine form, calibrating its humor and its menace just right." New York Daily News writer David Bianculli compared the premiere to the show's second season, noting that the episode showed "an assurance and a knowing playfulness that was missing most of last year." He complimented Cherry and Greenstein's script and approved the storylines for each character. Bianculli opined that the episode returned the quality of the show's first season and concluded: "Pass the word: If you've given up on Desperate Housewives, it's time to return to the neighborhood." Entertainment Weekly's Lindsay Soll identified Eva Longoria as the episode's strongest performer, declaring that she "definitely looks like the one to watch this season." Soll was glad to see that the Susan character was "a little more toned down and less accident-prone than usual," and called the scenes with Susan and Mike touching. Additionally, she opined that Laurie Metcalf "did a brilliant job of playing the classic television nosy neighbor," but expressed her confusion over the Orson storyline.

Dave Anderson of TV Guide called the season premiere first-rate, while praising the comedic Bree storyline and declaring the set-up for the Orson mystery storyline ingenious. He commended Marcia Cross' performance but opined that Longoria provided the best comedic relief. He also complimented Teri Hatcher's acting, commenting that she "was awesome in the poignant scene where she asks the comatose Mike permission to go on the "almost date" with Ian." Anderson identified the Scavo storyline as "the weakest link" in the episode and hoped that the Nora and Kayla characters would not remain on the show for too long. TV Guide writer Matt Roush shared similar sentiments regarding the Scavo storyline, stating that while the premiere overall was good, "Lynette is trapped in a story line so desperately unamusing, one that makes her and everyone around her act so idiotic, that you have to pray that we'll soon see the last of the obnoxious Nora, mother of Tom's surprise daughter." He described the storyline as "painfully unpleasant and unfunny." However, Roush praised the performances of Metcalf and Valerie Mahaffey, while concluding that Desperate Housewives "shows encouraging signs of getting its act together." In a separate review, Roush unfavorably compared the Orson character to Bree's former love interest, George Williams (Roger Bart), while also admitting to being "a bit weary" of the Gabrielle storyline.

USA Today's Robert Bianco acknowledged that "Listen to the Rain on the Roof" managed to avoid repeating many of the second season's mistakes noting that the four main characters spend more time together and the annual mystery "is hot-wired into the housewives themselves." Bianco remarked that Cross successfully maintained her position as the series' most prominent lead and was pleased with Susan's storyline, calling it "a conflict that gives Teri Hatcher a genuinely funny, rather than forced, sight gag." He approved of the writers' decision to distance the characters from their second season storylines, but opined: "The harder mistake to overcome is the damage the show did to its main characters — allowing them to behave in ways that made them seem weak, selfish, stupid and, at times, despicable." Bianco concluded: "It will take more than one good episode to win us back after all that. But it's certainly a good place to start." Jen Creer of TV Squad was mixed in her review. She criticized the lack of originality in the storylines, writing that the episode was similar to Sex and the City. Nevertheless, Creer complimented the main actresses, concluding, "I'll be tuning in next week -- for all of its camp and unoriginality, the show does continue to have that certain something, those little twists of genius that make it worth watching." Andy Dehnart of MSNBC was slightly more positive in his review, acknowledging that while "most of the housewives are stuck in their second-season ruts," the show's overall quality has improved, citing the Orson storyline as a welcomed change from the slow-moving Applewhite mystery arc. Overall, Dehnart approved of the episode and felt that the show "may be on track to finally pleasuring its audience in new, albeit familiar ways."

=== Awards and nominations ===
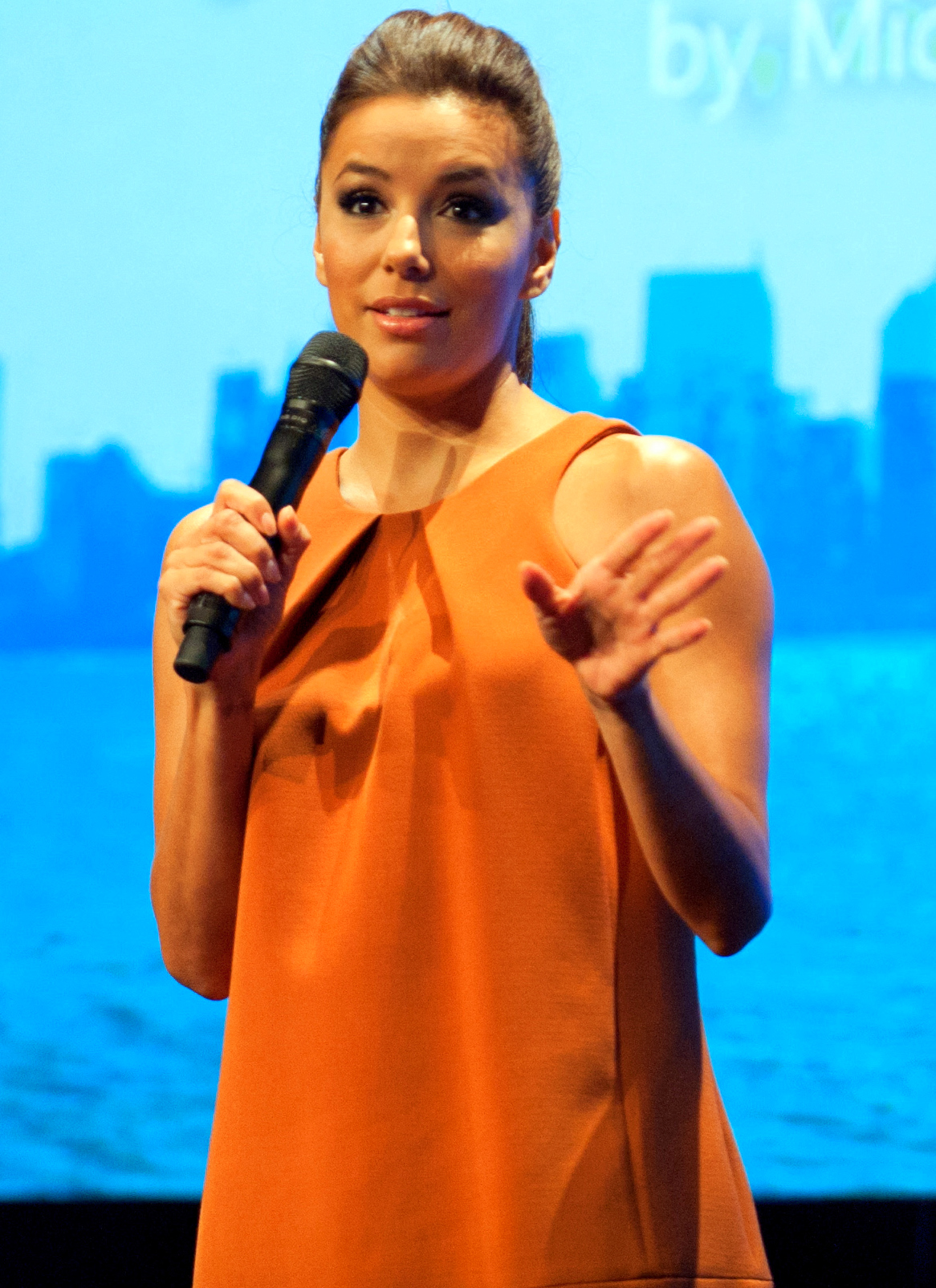
Longoria's portrayal of Gabrielle Solis received critical acclaim.

The season received critical acclaim, resulting in numerous awards and nominations for the cast and crew. The 59th Primetime Emmy Awards on September 16, 2007, sees Felicity Huffman receiving a nomination for her portrayal of Lynette Scavo in "Bang", in the Outstanding Actress in a Comedy Series category. Receiving nominations in the Outstanding Guest Actress in a Comedy Series were Dixie Carter, for her portrayal of Gloria Hodge in "Children and Art", and Laurie Metcalf for her performance in "Listen to the Rain on the Roof", playing Carolyn Bigsby". The season finale receives a nomination for Outstanding Costumes, whereas "It Takes Two" was nominated for Outstanding Hairstyling. The production team also received a nomination for Outstanding Casting in a Comedy Series. At the 2007 Bambi Awards, Eva Longoria was for the Television Series International for her portrayal of Gabrielle Solis. The Casting Society of America nominated Junie Lowry-Johnson and Scott Genkinger for Best Comedy Episodic Casting, whereas the Costume Designer's Guild Awards nominated the series for Excellence for Costume Design for Television. At the 19th Gay & Lesbian Alliance Against Defamation Media Awards the series is nominated for Outstanding Comedy Series, while the Imagen Foundation Awards sees Eva Longoria nominated for Best Television Actress. Longoria also received a nomination at the 2007 People's Choice Awards, which resulted in her being awarded as Favorite Television Actress. At the 2007 Monte Carlo TV Festival, the series wins the award for Best Comedy Series in the International TV Audience Award category, following another successful nomination the previous year. Marcia Cross's portrayal of Bree Van de Kamp and Shawn Pyfrom's performance in the role of Andrew Van de Kamp were nominated for Performance in a Comedy Series at the 2007 Prism Awards. Cross was awarded at the Satellite Awards in 2006 for Best Actress in Musical or Comedy Series, whereas Laurie Metcalf's portrayal of Carolyn Bigsby resulted in her receiving a nomination at the same year's ceremony. At the 2007 Screen Actors Guild Awards, the series was nominated for Outstanding Cast in a Comedy Series, following a Choice Television Comedy Show nomination at the Teen Choice Awards, and nomination for Eva Longoria for Choice Television Comedy Actress. The 2006 Young Artist Awards sees both Joy Lauren and Rachel G. Fox for their portrayals of Danielle Van de Kamp and Kayla Huntington Scavo, respectively.

=== Ratings ===
In spite of numerous fan complaints regarding the previous season, the American Broadcasting Company decided to keep Desperate Housewives in its original Sunday night timeslot. However, after two years of airing as a lead-in to fellow ABC series Grey's Anatomy, the series would be followed by Brothers & Sisters, then in its first season, but would remain the lead-out to Extreme Makeover: Home Edition. The show maintained its position as a top ten series and became the tenth most-watched program for the 2006-07 American television season, with an average of 17.5 million viewers per episode. Ratings for the series fell considerably during the season, with a 22 percent loss of viewership toward the end of the season. The highest-rated episode of the season was the season premiere, with 24.09 million viewers tuning in and 8.5 rating, ranking second in the week after the third-season premiere of Grey's Anatomy, which was watched by 25.41 million viewers and received a 9.0 rating. The episode showed a decrease in ratings compared to the previous season premiere, which received a 10.1 rating and was watched by 28.36 million viewers, almost five more million viewers than "Listen to the Rain on the Roof". Although the episode attracted less viewers than Grey's Anatomy's "Time Has Come Today", the episode outperformed CSI: Crime Scene Investigation, which would eventually become one of the most-watched series of the 2006–2007 season. The lowest-rated episode was the nineteenth, watched by 15.91 million viewers, receiving a 5.6 rating. It was the second most watched episode of an ABC series in the certain week, only after Grey's Anatomy's "Time After Time", which was watched by 21.12 million viewers, and ranked fourth in the week with a 7.5 rating. The season finale was watched by 18.82 million viewers and ranked seventh in the week, scoring a 6.6 rating. There was a significant decrease in the number of viewers, compared to the previous season finale, which attracted almost seven more million viewers, receiving an 8.6 rating.

== Episodes ==
No. overall	No. in season	Title	Directed by	Written by	Original release date	U.S. viewers (millions)
48	1	"Listen to the Rain on the Roof"	Larry Shaw	Marc Cherry & Jeff Greenstein	September 24, 2006	24.09
Flashbacks of Alma Hodge, Orson Hodge's presently ex-wife, are shown right before she disappeared after she tried to leave her husband. Six months have passed since Orson deliberately injured Mike in a hit-and-run, leaving him in a coma. Susan takes care of Mike while he is in the hospital and befriends Ian Hainsworth, whose wife Jane is in a coma as well. Ian asks Susan out, but she feels she might hurt Mike if she agrees to Ian's proposal. Bree becomes romantically involved with Orson and he later asks her to marry him. Lynette tries to stop Nora from forcing her way into the Scavo family while trying to keep Kayla, Tom's illegitimate daughter, close. Gabrielle threatens to send Xiao-Mei off to China to work as a slave. At Bree's engagement party, Carolyn Bigsby, Hodge's neighbor, accuses Orson of murdering his wife. A body is shown buried in clay in the new club house construction site.
49	2	"It Takes Two"	David Grossman	Kevin Murphy & Jenna Bans	October 1, 2006	21.42
The police discover the unidentified female body buried in clay and learn that all of her teeth were extracted, thereby preventing identification through dental records. Bree marries Orson despite collective opposition from her friends, especially Susan, who tries to contact Carolyn at her office. Susan's date with Ian becomes awkward when his in-laws show up at the restaurant and believe her to be a doctor. Lynette and Tom try to set Nora up with one of the bachelors and ultimately use Carlos, much to Gabrielle's dismay. Gabrielle and Carlos rush Xiao-Mei to the hospital after her water breaks, but are shocked to find that the baby is African-American. Edie allows her nephew Austin to stay with her when she catches him breaking into her house. Austin later meets Julie. The police call in Orson and Bree to identify the body as that of Alma, but Orson denies this. He hides the fact that he knows her by the name Monique.
50	3	"A Weekend in the Country"	Wendey Stanzler	Bob Daily	October 8, 2006	20.96
Bree cancels her honeymoon, much to Orson's dismay, when she learns that a reporter is covering a story of Andrew's life as a homeless teenager after he was abandoned by his alcoholic mother. Orson persuades Andrew to return home and not to hurt Bree anymore. Lynette's plans for a relaxing spa weekend with Gabrielle are interrupted when she is forced to take an eight-hour drive with Nora to help Tom handle her children. Lynette and Nora start fighting with each other, causing Nora to take a lift. Later, Lynette promises Tom that she will support him irrespective of the job he chooses. Gabrielle runs into John during her spa vacation and has sex with him, after which she is forced to hide from his fiancée. Susan and Ian plan a weekend away in a cottage where they begin arguing frequently, but eventually end up having sex. Edie warns Julie to stay away from Austin after she asks him to help her fix the fuse box. Edie visits Mike to retrieve her CD player and finds Mike awake from his coma.
51	4	"Like It Was"	Larry Shaw	John Pardee & Joey Murphy	October 15, 2006	20.64
Gabrielle's attempts to prevent Carlos from moving back into the house during the divorce proceedings ultimately results in her being arrested. Lynette bribes the pitcher and eventually the coach of Parker's baseball team to prevent him from quitting. Bree tries to cover the fact that Andrew was living on the streets by lying that he went to "drama camp". Orson eventually learns that Andrew had resorted to prostitution for money. Bree discovers that Danielle is sleeping with her history teacher, Mr. Faladi. The word of Mike's recovery spreads on Wisteria Lane, but Susan is not notified as she is in a mountain cabin with Ian without cellphone reception. After learning that Mike is suffering from temporary amnesia, Edie tries to steal Mike from Susan by lying about their relationship, telling him that Susan does not really love him. Later, Susan breaks up with Ian and visits Mike, but he tells her to go away.
52	5	"Nice She Ain't"	David Warren	Alexandra Cunningham & Susan Nirah Jaffee	October 22, 2006	19.71
Susan kidnaps Mike when Edie continues to lie about his relationship with her, but Mike still does not trust her, failing to recollect any memories about their relationship. Danielle attempts suicide with a spoon after Bree tries to sabotage her affair with Mr. Faladi. Bree forces Mr. Faladi to break up with Danielle by threatening to inform his wife about the affair. Gabrielle tries to hurt Carlos by faking "sex" with her new date. Tom tells Lynette of his plans to open a pizzeria, much to Lynette's shock, while Nora plots to sabotage Tom and Lynette's relationship by telling Tom that Lynette is a bully. Austin fools Julie into writing his English homework while he makes out with her friend, Sarah. Detective Ridley finds a phone number written on the corpse's hand which leads them to Mike Delfino Plumbing Services.
53	6	"Sweetheart, I Have to Confess"	David Grossman	Dahvi Waller & Josh Senter	October 29, 2006	21.24
Susan reconciles with Ian when she catches Edie having sex with Mike. Lynette is stunned to discover that Tom signed a lease for the pizzeria without consulting her. Nora kisses Tom to fool him into leaving Lynette, but her plan backfires when Lynette threatens her. Gabrielle pushes Carlos out a window after he fools her into having sex with her for financial gains after the divorce. Bree arranges a couples dinner with the Bigsbys, leading Bree to learn about Orson's past of domestic violence and Orson to find out about Harvey Bigsby's affair with Monique Polier. Later, Orson anonymously informs the police about Harvey's affair. Detective Ridley questions Mike about Monique's murder, but Mike insists he does not remember her. Mike later has flashbacks of Monique, indicating he knew her.
54	7	"Bang"	Larry Shaw	Joe Keenan	November 5, 2006	22.65
Orson explains to Bree that Alma suffered her injuries due to a fall after attacking him. Carolyn holds Harvey hostage at gunpoint in his supermarket along with Julie, Austin, Edie, Lynette, Nora and a few others after Bree tells her about Harvey's affair with Monique. While watching the incident on the news, Gabrielle and Carlos promise to keep their differences aside and live happily if not together. Nora tells Carolyn that Lynette is trying to steal her child, and Lynette counters that Nora tried to seduce her husband, causing Carolyn to immediately shoot Nora in the chest. As Nora bleeds to death, Lynette tearfully promises to take care of Kayla. After Lynette quarrels with Carolyn for killing Nora, Carolyn shoots Lynette before Austin wrestles her to the ground, leaving one of the hostages the opportunity to kill Carolyn.
55	8	"Children and Art"	Wendey Stanzler	Kevin Etten & Jenna Bans	November 12, 2006	22.27
Detective Ridley is eager to search Mike's home when he is discharged from the hospital but does not find a toolbox in his premises. Bree tries to contact Orson's mother, Gloria Hodge, and allows her to move in despite Orson's resistance. Gloria threatens to reveal Orson's secret if he tries to send her back to the nursing home. Gabrielle returns to modeling, but is stunned to discover that she will be dressed up as the mom of a teenage girl in the photoshoot. Susan seeks Karl's help to set boundaries for Julie and Austin, who start dating after the supermarket incident. Lynette bakes a "Thank You" cake for Art Shepherd, the new neighbor who saved her life at the supermarket. However, Lynette worries that Art is a pedophile when she discovers a wall in his house plastered with photographs of shirtless young boys.
56	9	"Beautiful Girls"	David Grossman	Dahvi Waller & Susan Nirah Jaffee	November 19, 2006	21.63
Gabrielle begins coaching young girls for a beauty pageant but causes controversy with their parents after teaching the girls ill weight loss methods. Susan tries in vain to befriend Ian's butler, Rupert Cavanaugh, after she moves some of her stuff in his house. Carlos moves in with Mike. Lynette tries to turn Art in to the police as a pedophile, but her attempts are unsuccessful due to a lack of evidence. Lynette later barges into Art's house, but discovers that the wall of pictures are gone. Gloria steals liquor with help from Andrew and eventually reveals to Bree that Monique Polier was having a double affair with Orson and Harvey while Orson was married. Bree feels shocked and betrayed and asks Orson to move out of her house. Mike tries to hide the acquired toolbox only to find Detective Ridley waiting for him in the shadows.
57	10	"The Miracle Song"	Larry Shaw	Bob Daily	November 26, 2006	21.43
Susan asks Bree to prepare a homecooked meal for Ian's parents, but Bree refuses after she and Susan fight over Orson's innocence. Edie splits up with Mike when he is sent to jail for Monique's murder. Susan tries to help Mike by breaking into Orson's office and finds crucial evidence that might prove Orson is hiding something. Orson reveals some of the facts about his affair to Bree which causes her to take him back and throw Gloria out. Gabrielle destroys a friendship between two girls in order to date Bill, one of their fathers. Lynette ignites a "No pedophile" strike against Art, which causes his sister to die of cardiac arrest. As Art is forced to leave, he threatens Lynette by saying he is free to resort to his pedophilia emotions now that his sister is dead, suggesting that he is a pedophile, or pretending to sound like one to scare Lynette. Gloria plans a late-night meeting with Alma.
58	11	"No Fits, No Fights, No Feuds"	Sanaa Hamri	Alexandra Cunningham & Josh Senter	January 7, 2007	18.71
Alma buys a house from Edie on Wisteria Lane, meets Bree and reveals the truth surrounding her disappearance. Susan meets Mike one last time to tell him that Ian will not allow her to see him again. Mike meets Paul in prison, but he does not remember him. Gabrielle receives an anonymous bouquet while on a date with Bill and thinks the mystery man is Carlos. Julie loses her virginity to Austin, who is revealed to also be sleeping with Danielle. Lynette tries to mend her relationship with Kayla but finds out she blames her for Nora's death. Bree tries to shame Susan by inviting her to see Alma at a dinner party, indicating that Susan's suspicion about Orson was wrong. Susan ends up calling Detective Ridley to tell him about Orson's affair with Monique, causing Bree to break her friendship with Susan.
59	12	"Not While I'm Around"	David Grossman	Kevin Murphy & Kevin Etten	January 14, 2007	16.76
Tom and Lynette clash over decision-making for the pizzeria which results in Lynette discovering a number of problems the pizzeria is facing. After receiving more gifts, Gabrielle learns that her secret admirer, or stalker, is none other than Zach Young. Susan butts heads with Edie when Edie provides contraceptive pills to Julie and Austin so that they can have sex. Both of them later catch Austin and Danielle making out, and Susan informs Julie about Austin's affair. Paul pays a group of prisoners to attack Mike so he can pretend to save him, but Mike finds out about the scheme. Bree tells Orson to "make" Alma move from Wisteria Lane, but instead Alma threatens to reveal to Bree what Orson did to Monique. Bree later finds a photo of Orson and Monique and a bag full of teeth under one of Alma's floorboards.
60	13	"Come Play Wiz Me"	Larry Shaw	Valerie Ahern & Christian McLaughlin	January 21, 2007	17.14
Susan visits Jane in the hospital when Ian is away on business only to watch her die. Susan also learns about Jane's affair and decides to stay away from Mike to protect her relationship with Ian. Lynette initially tries to stall from returning to her workplace, but eventually quits when she feels she wants to work with Tom in the pizzeria. Mike clashes with Paul, who informs Mike about their history and asks him to bring Zach to come and talk to him. Zach meets with Paul but spitefully refuses to help him. At Susan's behest, Gabrielle spends time with Zach in return for money to bail Mike out of jail; Gabrielle also learns that Zach is lonely, using money to make friends. Gloria, determined to have a grandchild, asks Alma to rape Orson while he is drugged, but Bree finds him naked with her.
61	14	"I Remember That"	David Warren	John Pardee & Joey Murphy	February 11, 2007	18.10
Ian proposes to Susan at Jane's funeral, but she postpones the offer. Tom and Lynette face further problems in decision-making when Edie begs Tom to let Austin work at the pizzeria. Orson explains the truth about Monique's death to Bree and Bree asks him to confess to the police. Later, Bree gets injured in a mysterious accident which makes Andrew believe Orson is responsible. Meanwhile, Gloria locks Alma in a room when she suggests going to the police. Annoyed by Gabrielle's disinterest in him, Zach threatens Gabrielle's boyfriend to dump her. Mike's memories return when he visits a hypnotherapist and discovers that he did not kill Monique, but had instead met Orson at her house the day she died. Mike confronts Orson, resulting in a fight that causes Orson to fall off the hospital's roof.
62	15	"The Little Things You Do Together"	David Grossman	Marc Cherry & Joe Keenan	February 18, 2007	18.51
It is revealed that Gloria killed Monique and removed her teeth before burying her body with Orson's help, much to Orson's reluctance. Bree and Susan reconcile. Lynette is in trouble with Tom when they do not have enough chairs for the pizzeria's grand opening. Ian proposes to Susan at the grand opening when he discovers Mike had an engraved ring for Susan the night of the accident. Zach tries to convince Gabrielle they had sex when she was drunk, but she does not remember. Gabrielle asks Carlos to threaten Zach, but he does not follow through after deducing they did not have sex. Andrew asks Danielle to babysit Bree, but she runs off to the opening with her friend, asking Gloria to stay and take care of Bree instead. Gloria intends to murder Bree while making it look like a suicide, but Orson walks in when she is about to commit the crime. Orson permanently paralyzes Gloria when he learns she killed his father. Alma falls from her roof and dies while escaping.
63	16	"My Husband, the Pig"	Larry Shaw	Brian A. Alexander	March 4, 2007	18.31
Bree and Orson are about to leave for their honeymoon as Danielle tells them she is pregnant with Austin's child. Austin apologizes to Julie, who agrees to take him back, but he is forced by Andrew to leave Fairview after he learns about the pregnancy. Ian presents Susan a ring; she takes it to get resized and runs into Mike who is selling "his" ring. Mike and Orson make a deal to keep each other's secrets safe. Tom tries to make a nice romantic gesture for Lynette on their ninth anniversary, but fails miserably. Victor Lang, a candidate running for Mayor of Fairview, flirts with Gabrielle. Edie cares for her son, Travers, while her ex-husband is on a trip; Carlos interrupts his date when he sees Travers playing alone on the street at night. When Mike and Ian bet on Susan at a game of poker, Ian wins, preventing Mike from seeing her again.
64	17	"Dress Big"	Matthew Diamond	Kevin Etten & Susan Nirah Jaffee	April 8, 2007	15.93
Susan clashes with Ian's parents when they ask her to sign a prenuptial agreement stating she will not get hold of the estate and money if she divorces Ian in the future, but she refuses. Susan later learns Graham, Ian's father, has a secret habit of wearing women's underwear, and she uses this to blackmail him into not letting her sign the prenup. Lynette is devastated when she finds an unconscious Tom on the floor in the pizzeria and is informed he will be unable to work for at least three months because of a ruptured disc. Gabrielle "borrows" some of Victor's ex-wife's clothes after her closet is ruined, but runs into his ex-wife at a party who demands her clothes back. Edie tries to seduce Carlos, but he berates her for not being a committed mother or woman; they later have sex when she agrees to change.
65	18	"Liaisons"	David Grossman	Jenna Bans & Alexandra Cunningham	April 15, 2007	16.35
Tom's crankiness takes a toll on Lynette for hiring sous-chef Rick Colleti, a former drug addict, to work at the pizzeria, as well as Mrs. McCluskey, who quits her babysitting job. Edie and Carlos have sex again to prove they are not "bad in bed" and plan to take their relationship to the "family" level. Victor confesses he is in love with Gabrielle when she tries to make him jealous. Susan and Ian contemplate moving permanently to London after Ian thinks Mike will always be around them in Fairview. Mike quits his hypnotherapy sessions because he feels it reminds him of his love for Susan and comes to Susan and Ian's rescue when their car falls into a lake. Later, Mike kisses her when she gives him a "thank you" gift, causing Susan to doubt her loyalty for Ian. Tom calls to apologize to Mrs. McCluskey, who is later revealed to have frozen her husband Gilbert's body in the basement freezer.
66	19	"God, That's Good"	Larry Shaw	Dahvi Waller & Josh Senter	April 22, 2007	15.91
Susan tries to set up Mike with her wedding designer to prevent awkwardness from the kiss, but he deliberately sabotages her plan. Susan, Mike and Ian get in an argument, which results in Susan calling off the wedding when she discovers that both men bet on her in a poker game. Lynette decides to add some of Rick's delicacies to the menu, much to Tom's dismay. Later, she listens to Rick's advice over Tom's. Victor gets blackmailed when he is caught having sex with Gabrielle on camera, which causes him to lose points in the polls. Seeing this, Gabrielle tells the media that they are engaged. Edie and Carlos hide their relationship from the neighborhood, but Edie discovers that Carlos is doing this because he is still in love with Gabrielle. Mrs. McCluskey swears Parker into secrecy when he discovers Gilbert's body, but she is sent to prison when her neighbor Ida also comes across it.
67	20	"Gossip"	Wendey Stanzler	John Pardee & Joey Murphy	April 29, 2007	17.17
Gabrielle is unhappy when she learns about Edie's relationship with Carlos and asks Susan and Lynette to give her the cold shoulder; Gabrielle later realizes that Carlos is still in love with her and is not serious about Edie. Susan is forced to pour out her feelings to a court-ordered therapist over her choice between Mike and Ian, but she gets rejected by both of them who leave for a hot-spring hike and England, respectively. Mrs. McCluskey reveals that she froze Gilbert's dead body so that she could cash in his pension checks, which would otherwise have gone to his first wife after his death. Realizing her motives, Lynette agrees to rehire Mrs. McClusky as her babysitter. Lynette lies to Tom to spend time with Rick at the pizzeria late one night, but causes a rift when Kayla tells Tom that Lynette might be attracted to Rick.
68	21	"Into the Woods"	David Grossman	Alexandra Cunningham	May 6, 2007	17.16
Susan gets lost in the woods when she tries to follow Mike to the hot springs by hiking with a guide that she abandons after the guide gives her a reality check. However, Mike finds her. After a robbery, during which Rick and Lynette were locked in the pizzeria freezer, Tom tries to force Rick to quit so that he does not spoil his marriage, but Rick refuses. Lynette, however, fires him when he tells her that he has feelings for her. Fearing that Carlos is losing interest in their relationship, Edie decides to fight for joint custody for Travers to force Carlos to be around her, but lets it go when Carlos reminds her that Travers needs a stable life. Gabrielle decides to teach a policeman a lesson when he calls her a "bitch", but it backfires when she gets arrested. Victor blames her for humiliating him, but later sends two goons to attack the policeman when he discovers he twisted Gabrielle's wrist.
69	22	"What Would We Do Without You?"	Larry Shaw	Bob Daily	May 13, 2007	16.13
Mike proposes to Susan on the first anniversary of the day they were supposed to get engaged. However, Susan discovers that Gabrielle's wedding is booked for the same date as her own, leading to an argument. The two reconcile and decide to have a double wedding; Victor refuses, saying he is not willing to share a wedding with an ex-convict like Mike. Edie visits Mrs. Lily Sims, Carlos' landlord, and convinces her to invalidate Carlos' lease so that he moves in with her, but Carlos confesses he is not in love with Edie. Knowing Carlos wants children, Edie suggests they try having a child, while secretly taking birth control pills. Tom tries to make Lynette talk to a marriage counselor without her knowledge, and they argue when Tom suspects Lynette has feelings for Rick. A CAT scan shows Lynette has swollen lymph nodes, which could be lymphoma.
70	23	"Getting Married Today"	David Grossman	Joe Keenan & Kevin Murphy	May 20, 2007	18.82
Gabrielle discovers Victor married her to secure the Latino vote in his planned gubernatorial campaign and makes out with Carlos, who angrily breaks up with Edie when he learns about the birth control pills. Bree returns to Wisteria Lane with Orson and pretends to be pregnant with Danielle's baby, while a pregnant Danielle is staying at the Sisters of Hope Convent. Lynette's estranged mother, Stella, arrives unannounced to help her through her lymphoma treatment, but Lynette refuses to take her money or help. Susan and Mike get married privately in the woods to cut back on expenses. Edie, distraught over her breakup with Carlos, tries to commit suicide by hanging herself.

== DVD release ==
The Complete Third Season was released as a 6-Disc DVD set in region 1 on September 4, 2007 including all 23 episodes with 3 seasons, plus a bunch of bonus features like behind-the-scenes featurettes, deleted scenes, a blooper reel and more; the set also included subtitles in Spanish and French and an additional Spanish language track being also available. In region 2, the season was released on November 5, 2007 as a 6-DVD set. Exclusively to Amazon in the UK, the season was released for a limited time with a bonus disc inside.

Desperate Housewives: The Complete Third Season (The Dirty Laundry Edition)
Set details	Special features	
23 Episodes; 6-Disc Set; English (Dolby Digital 5.1 Surround); Spanish (Dolby Surround 2.0); English SDH, Spanish & French subtitles; Runtime: 992 minutes; Audio Commentaries	On Set With Eva; Here Comes The Bride - Behind-the-scenes of the Season Finale episode "Getting Married Today"; Amas de Casa Desesperadas - Creator Marc Cherry reacts to some scenes of the latin version of the series, "Amas de Casa Desesperadas"; Desperate Moments; Cherry-Picked: Creator Marc Cherry's Favourite Scenes; Deleted Scenes; Audio Commentaries by creator Marc Cherry on the deleted scenes; Bloopers	
DVD release dates
Region 1	Region 2	Region 4
September 4, 2007	November 5, 2007	TBA
