= List of Desperate Housewives episodes =

Desperate Housewives is an American comedy drama-mystery television series that premiered on October 3, 2004 on ABC. Seasons one through eight have been released on DVD in Regions 1, 2, 3, 4 and 5.

Desperate Housewives follows the lives of four women – Susan (Teri Hatcher), Lynette (Felicity Huffman), Bree (Marcia Cross) and Gabrielle (Eva Longoria) – through the eyes of Mary Alice (Brenda Strong), their deceased friend and neighbor.

The vast majority of the episodes are titled after lyrics by composer/lyricist Stephen Sondheim. Episodes were broadcast on Sunday nights at 9/8c. During the course of the series, 180 episodes of Desperate Housewives aired, including seven specials over eight seasons, between October 3, 2004, and May 13, 2012.

== Series overview ==
Season	Episodes	Originally released		Rank	Average viewership (in millions)	18–49 Rank	18–49 Rating
Season	Episodes	First released	Last released	Rank	Average viewership (in millions)	18–49 Rank	18–49 Rating
1	23	October 3, 2004	May 22, 2005	4	24.13	3	10.4
2	24	September 25, 2005	May 21, 2006	4	23.99	3	9.3
3	23	September 24, 2006	May 20, 2007	10	19.18	5	6.9
4	17	September 30, 2007	May 18, 2008	6	17.83	3	7.0
5	24	September 28, 2008	May 17, 2009	9	14.80	5	5.3
6	23	September 27, 2009	May 16, 2010	20	12.82	9	4.8
7	23	September 26, 2010	May 15, 2011	26	11.17	18	3.8
8	23	September 25, 2011	May 13, 2012	37	8.76	27	3.6

== Episodes ==
=== Season 1 (2004–05) ===
No. overall	No. in season	Title	Directed by	Written by	Original release date	U.S. viewers (millions)
1	1	"Pilot"	Charles McDougall	Marc Cherry	October 3, 2004	21.65
2	2	"Ah, But Underneath"	Larry Shaw	Marc Cherry	October 10, 2004	20.03
3	3	"Pretty Little Picture"	Arlene Sanford	Oliver Goldstick	October 17, 2004	20.87
4	4	"Who's That Woman?"	Jeff Melman	Marc Cherry & Tom Spezialy	October 24, 2004	21.49
5	5	"Come In, Stranger"	Arlene Sanford	Alexandra Cunningham	October 31, 2004	22.14
6	6	"Running to Stand Still"	Fred Gerber	Tracey Stern	November 7, 2004	24.60
7	7	"Anything You Can Do"	Larry Shaw	John Pardee & Joey Murphy	November 21, 2004	24.21
8	8	"Guilty"	Fred Gerber	Kevin Murphy	November 28, 2004	27.24
9	9	"Suspicious Minds"	Larry Shaw	Jenna Bans	December 12, 2004	21.56
10	10	"Come Back to Me"	Fred Gerber	Patty Lin	December 19, 2004	22.34
11	11	"Move On"	John David Coles	David Schulner	January 9, 2005	25.20
12	12	"Every Day a Little Death"	David Grossman	Chris Black	January 16, 2005	24.09
13	13	"Your Fault"	Arlene Sanford	Kevin Etten	January 23, 2005	25.95
14	14	"Love Is in the Air"	Jeff Melman	Tom Spezialy	February 13, 2005	22.30
15	15	"Impossible"	Larry Shaw	Marc Cherry & Tom Spezialy	February 20, 2005	24.19
16	16	"The Ladies Who Lunch"	Arlene Sanford	Alexandra Cunningham	March 27, 2005	24.08
17	17	"There Won't Be Trumpets"	Jeff Melman	John Pardee & Joey Murphy	April 3, 2005	24.61
18	18	"Children Will Listen"	Larry Shaw	Kevin Murphy	April 10, 2005	25.55
19	19	"Live Alone and Like It"	Arlene Sanford	Jenna Bans	April 17, 2005	25.27
20	20	"Fear No More"	Jeff Melman	Adam Barr	May 1, 2005	25.69
21	21	"Sunday in the Park with George"	Larry Shaw	Katie Ford	May 8, 2005	26.10
22	22	"Goodbye for Now"	David Grossman	Josh Senter	May 15, 2005	25.28
23	23	"One Wonderful Day"	Larry Shaw	John Pardee & Joey Murphy & Marc Cherry & Tom Spezialy & Kevin Murphy	May 22, 2005	30.62

=== Season 2 (2005–06) ===
No. overall	No. in season	Title	Directed by	Written by	Original release date	U.S. viewers (millions)
24	1	"Next"	Larry Shaw	Jenna Bans & Kevin Murphy	September 25, 2005	28.36
25	2	"You Could Drive a Person Crazy"	David Grossman	Chris Black & Alexandra Cunningham	October 2, 2005	27.11
26	3	"You'll Never Get Away from Me"	Arlene Sanford	Tom Spezialy & Ellie Herman	October 9, 2005	26.06
27	4	"My Heart Belongs to Daddy"	Robert Duncan McNeill	John Pardee & Joey Murphy	October 16, 2005	25.78
28	5	"They Asked Me Why I Believe in You"	David Grossman	Alan Cross	October 23, 2005	25.22
29	6	"I Wish I Could Forget You"	Larry Shaw	Kevin Etten & Josh Senter	November 6, 2005	23.93
30	7	"Color and Light"	David Grossman	Marc Cherry	November 13, 2005	25.93
31	8	"The Sun Won't Set"	Stephen Cragg	Jenna Bans	November 20, 2005	25.92
32	9	"That's Good, That's Bad"	Larry Shaw	Kevin Murphy	November 27, 2005	25.89
33	10	"Coming Home"	Arlene Sanford	Chris Black	December 4, 2005	25.52
34	11	"One More Kiss"	Wendey Stanzler	Joey Murphy & John Pardee	January 8, 2006	23.72
35	12	"We're Gonna Be All Right"	David Grossman	Alexandra Cunningham	January 15, 2006	22.52
36	13	"There's Something About a War"	Larry Shaw	Kevin Etten	January 22, 2006	25.33
37	14	"Silly People"	Robert Duncan McNeill	Tom Spezialy	February 12, 2006	23.47
38	15	"Thank You So Much"	David Grossman	Dahvi Waller	February 19, 2006	23.41
39	16	"There Is No Other Way"	Randy Zisk	Bruce Zimmerman	March 12, 2006	22.20
40	17	"Could I Leave You?"	Pam Thomas	Scott Sanford Tobis	March 26, 2006	21.41
41	18	"Everybody Says Don't"	Tom Cherones	Teleplay by : Jenna Bans & Alexandra Cunningham; Story by : Jim Lincoln	April 2, 2006	21.82
42	19	"Don't Look at Me"	David Grossman	Josh Senter	April 16, 2006	20.02
43	20	"It Wasn't Meant to Happen"	Larry Shaw	Marc Cherry & Tom Spezialy	April 30, 2006	21.30
44	21	"I Know Things Now"	Wendey Stanzler	Kevin Etten & Bruce Zimmerman	May 7, 2006	21.33
45	22	"No One Is Alone"	David Grossman	Kevin Murphy & Chris Black	May 14, 2006	21.03
46 47	23 24	"Remember"	Larry Shaw	Teleplay by : Marc Cherry & Jenna Bans; Story by : Alexandra Cunningham & Tom Spezialy	May 21, 2006	24.23

=== Season 3 (2006–07) ===
No. overall	No. in season	Title	Directed by	Written by	Original release date	U.S. viewers (millions)
48	1	"Listen to the Rain on the Roof"	Larry Shaw	Marc Cherry & Jeff Greenstein	September 24, 2006	24.09
49	2	"It Takes Two"	David Grossman	Kevin Murphy & Jenna Bans	October 1, 2006	21.42
50	3	"A Weekend in the Country"	Wendey Stanzler	Bob Daily	October 8, 2006	20.96
51	4	"Like It Was"	Larry Shaw	John Pardee & Joey Murphy	October 15, 2006	20.64
52	5	"Nice She Ain't"	David Warren	Alexandra Cunningham & Susan Nirah Jaffee	October 22, 2006	19.71
53	6	"Sweetheart, I Have to Confess"	David Grossman	Dahvi Waller & Josh Senter	October 29, 2006	21.24
54	7	"Bang"	Larry Shaw	Joe Keenan	November 5, 2006	22.65
55	8	"Children and Art"	Wendey Stanzler	Kevin Etten & Jenna Bans	November 12, 2006	22.27
56	9	"Beautiful Girls"	David Grossman	Dahvi Waller & Susan Nirah Jaffee	November 19, 2006	21.63
57	10	"The Miracle Song"	Larry Shaw	Bob Daily	November 26, 2006	21.43
58	11	"No Fits, No Fights, No Feuds"	Sanaa Hamri	Alexandra Cunningham & Josh Senter	January 7, 2007	18.71
59	12	"Not While I'm Around"	David Grossman	Kevin Murphy & Kevin Etten	January 14, 2007	16.76
60	13	"Come Play Wiz Me"	Larry Shaw	Valerie Ahern & Christian McLaughlin	January 21, 2007	17.14
61	14	"I Remember That"	David Warren	John Pardee & Joey Murphy	February 11, 2007	18.10
62	15	"The Little Things You Do Together"	David Grossman	Marc Cherry & Joe Keenan	February 18, 2007	18.51
63	16	"My Husband, the Pig"	Larry Shaw	Brian A. Alexander	March 4, 2007	18.31
64	17	"Dress Big"	Matthew Diamond	Kevin Etten & Susan Nirah Jaffee	April 8, 2007	15.93
65	18	"Liaisons"	David Grossman	Jenna Bans & Alexandra Cunningham	April 15, 2007	16.35
66	19	"God, That's Good"	Larry Shaw	Dahvi Waller & Josh Senter	April 22, 2007	15.91
67	20	"Gossip"	Wendey Stanzler	John Pardee & Joey Murphy	April 29, 2007	17.17
68	21	"Into the Woods"	David Grossman	Alexandra Cunningham	May 6, 2007	17.16
69	22	"What Would We Do Without You?"	Larry Shaw	Bob Daily	May 13, 2007	16.13
70	23	"Getting Married Today"	David Grossman	Joe Keenan & Kevin Murphy	May 20, 2007	18.82

=== Season 4 (2007–08) ===
No. overall	No. in season	Title	Directed by	Written by	Original release date	U.S. viewers (millions)
71	1	"Now You Know"	Larry Shaw	Marc Cherry	September 30, 2007	19.32
72	2	"Smiles of a Summer Night"	David Grossman	Bob Daily & Matt Berry	October 7, 2007	17.82
73	3	"The Game"	Bethany Rooney	Joey Murphy & John Pardee	October 14, 2007	18.89
74	4	"If There's Anything I Can't Stand"	Larry Shaw	Alexandra Cunningham & Lori Kirkland Baker	October 21, 2007	18.21
75	5	"Art Isn't Easy"	David Grossman	Jason Ganzel	October 28, 2007	18.28
76	6	"Now I Know, Don't Be Scared"	Larry Shaw	Susan Nirah Jaffee & Dahvi Waller	November 4, 2007	18.58
77	7	"You Can't Judge a Book By Its Cover"	David Warren	Chuck Ranberg & Anne Flett-Giordano	November 11, 2007	18.63
78	8	"A Distant Past"	Jay Torres	Joe Keenan	November 25, 2007	18.64
79	9	"Something's Coming"	David Grossman	Joey Murphy & John Pardee	December 2, 2007	20.65
80	10	"Welcome to Kanagawa"	Larry Shaw	Jamie Gorenberg & Jordon Nardino	January 6, 2008	19.78
81	11	"Sunday"	David Grossman	Alexandra Cunningham & Lori Kirkland Baker	April 13, 2008	16.37
82	12	"In Buddy's Eyes"	Larry Shaw	Jeff Greenstein	April 20, 2008	15.75
83	13	"Hello, Little Girl"	Bethany Rooney	Susan Nirah Jaffee & Jamie Gorenberg	April 27, 2008	16.35
84	14	"Opening Doors"	David Grossman	Dahvi Waller & Jordon Nardino	May 4, 2008	16.76
85	15	"Mother Said"	David Warren	Chuck Ranberg & Anne Flett-Giordano	May 11, 2008	15.43
86	16	"The Gun Song"	Bethany Rooney	Bob Daily & Matt Berry	May 18, 2008	16.84
87	17	"Free"	David Grossman	Jeff Greenstein	May 18, 2008	16.84

=== Season 5 (2008–09) ===
No. overall	No. in season	Title	Directed by	Written by	Original release date	U.S. viewers (millions)
88	1	"You're Gonna Love Tomorrow"	Larry Shaw	Marc Cherry	September 28, 2008	18.68
89	2	"We're So Happy You're So Happy"	David Grossman	Alexandra Cunningham	October 5, 2008	15.69
90	3	"Kids Ain't Like Everybody Else"	Bethany Rooney	Joe Keenan	October 12, 2008	15.51
91	4	"Back in Business"	Scott Ellis	John Pardee & Joey Murphy	October 19, 2008	15.49
92	5	"Mirror, Mirror"	David Grossman	Jeff Greenstein	October 26, 2008	15.95
93	6	"There's Always a Woman"	Matthew Diamond	John Paul Bullock III	November 2, 2008	15.93
94	7	"What More Do I Need?"	Larry Shaw	Matt Berry	November 9, 2008	15.85
95	8	"City on Fire"	David Grossman	Bob Daily	November 16, 2008	16.84
96	9	"Me and My Town"	David Warren	Lori Kirkland Baker	November 30, 2008	15.81
97	10	"A Vision's Just a Vision"	Larry Shaw	David Flebotte	December 7, 2008	16.09
98	11	"Home Is the Place"	David Grossman	Jamie Gorenberg	January 4, 2009	14.39
99	12	"Connect! Connect!"	Ken Whittingham	Jordon Nardino	January 11, 2009	13.79
100	13	"The Best Thing That Ever Could Have Happened"	Larry Shaw	Marc Cherry & Bob Daily	January 18, 2009	13.08
101	14	"Mama Spent Money When She Had None"	David Warren	Jason Ganzel	February 8, 2009	13.82
102	15	"In a World Where the Kings Are Employers"	David Grossman	Lori Kirkland Baker	February 15, 2009	14.01
103	16	"Crime Doesn't Pay"	Larry Shaw	Jamie Gorenberg	March 8, 2009	13.65
104	17	"The Story of Lucy and Jessie"	Bethany Rooney	Jordon Nardino	March 15, 2009	14.60
105	18	"A Spark. To Pierce the Dark."	David Grossman	Alexandra Cunningham	March 22, 2009	14.75
106	19	"Look Into Their Eyes and You See What They Know"	Larry Shaw	Matt Berry	April 19, 2009	13.85
107	20	"Rose's Turn"	David Warren	Dave Flebotte	April 26, 2009	13.64
108	21	"Bargaining"	David Grossman	David Schladweiler	May 3, 2009	13.49
109	22	"Marry Me a Little"	Larry Shaw	Jason Ganzel	May 10, 2009	12.29
110 111	23 24	"Everybody Says Don't If It's Only In Your Head"	Bethany Rooney David Grossman	John Pardee & Joey Murphy Jeffrey Richman	May 17, 2009	13.96

=== Season 6 (2009–10) ===
No. overall	No. in season	Title	Directed by	Written by	Original release date	U.S. viewers (millions)
112	1	"Nice Is Different Than Good"	Larry Shaw	Marc Cherry	September 27, 2009	13.64
113	2	"Being Alive"	David Grossman	Matt Berry	October 4, 2009	14.64
114	3	"Never Judge a Lady by Her Lover"	Andrew Doerfer	Bob Daily	October 11, 2009	13.42
115	4	"The God-Why-Don't-You-Love-Me Blues"	David Warren	Alexandra Cunningham	October 18, 2009	13.68
116	5	"Everybody Ought to Have a Maid"	Larry Shaw	Jamie Gorenberg	October 25, 2009	14.18
117	6	"Don't Walk on the Grass"	David Grossman	Marco Pennette	November 1, 2009	14.08
118	7	"Careful the Things You Say"	Bethany Rooney	Peter Lefcourt	November 8, 2009	13.80
119	8	"The Coffee Cup"	Larry Shaw	Dave Flebotte	November 15, 2009	14.72
120	9	"Would I Think of Suicide?"	Ken Whittingham	Jason Ganzel	November 29, 2009	12.78
121	10	"Boom Crunch"	David Grossman	John Pardee & Joey Murphy	December 6, 2009	14.86
122	11	"If..."	Larry Shaw	Jamie Gorenberg	January 3, 2010	15.35
123	12	"You Gotta Get a Gimmick"	David Grossman	Joe Keenan	January 10, 2010	14.03
124	13	"How About a Friendly Shrink?"	Lonny Price	Jason Ganzel	January 17, 2010	11.32
125	14	"The Glamorous Life"	Bethany Rooney	Dave Flebotte	January 31, 2010	11.44
126	15	"Lovely"	David Warren	David Schladweiler	February 21, 2010	10.92
127	16	"The Chase"	Larry Shaw	John Pardee & Joey Murphy	February 28, 2010	10.89
128	17	"Chromolume No. 7"	Lonny Price	Marco Pennette	March 14, 2010	12.01
129	18	"My Two Young Men"	David Grossman	Bob Daily	March 21, 2010	10.84
130	19	"We All Deserve to Die"	Larry Shaw	Josann McGibbon & Sara Parriott	April 18, 2010	10.62
131	20	"Epiphany"	David Grossman	Marc Cherry	April 25, 2010	11.29
132	21	"A Little Night Music"	David Warren	Matt Berry	May 2, 2010	12.12
133	22	"The Ballad of Booth"	Larry Shaw	Bob Daily	May 9, 2010	11.36
134	23	"I Guess This Is Goodbye"	David Grossman	Alexandra Cunningham	May 16, 2010	12.75

=== Season 7 (2010–11) ===
No. overall	No. in season	Title	Directed by	Written by	Original release date	Prod. code	U.S. viewers (millions)
135	1	"Remember Paul?"	David Grossman	Marc Cherry	September 26, 2010	701	13.06
136	2	"You Must Meet My Wife"	Larry Shaw	Dave Flebotte	October 3, 2010	702	13.23
137	3	"Truly Content"	Tara Nicole Weyr	Matt Berry	October 10, 2010	703	12.38
138	4	"The Thing That Counts Is What's Inside"	David Grossman	Jason Ganzel	October 17, 2010	704	12.67
139	5	"Let Me Entertain You"	Lonny Price	Sara Parriott & Josann McGibbon	October 24, 2010	705	12.16
140	6	"Excited and Scared"	Jeff Greenstein	Jeff Greenstein	October 31, 2010	706	11.10
141	7	"A Humiliating Business"	Larry Shaw	Marco Pennette	November 7, 2010	707	12.72
142	8	"Sorry Grateful"	David Grossman	Annie Weisman	November 14, 2010	708	11.92
143	9	"Pleasant Little Kingdom"	Arlene Sanford	Dave Flebotte	December 5, 2010	709	11.36
144	10	"Down the Block There's a Riot"	Larry Shaw	Bob Daily	December 12, 2010	710	11.60
145	11	"Assassins"	David Warren	John Paul Bullock III	January 2, 2011	711	12.19
146	12	"Where Do I Belong"	David Grossman	David Schladweiler	January 9, 2011	712	12.83
147	13	"I'm Still Here"	Lonny Price	Josann McGibbon & Sara Parriott	January 16, 2011	713	10.25
148	14	"Flashback"	Andrew Doerfer	Matt Berry	February 13, 2011	714	9.20
149	15	"Farewell Letter"	David Grossman	Marco Pennette	February 20, 2011	715	10.58
150	16	"Searching"	Larry Shaw	Jeff Greenstein	March 6, 2011	716	11.35
151	17	"Everything's Different, Nothing's Changed"	David Warren	Annie Weisman	April 3, 2011	717	9.05
152	18	"Moments in the Woods"	David Grossman	John Paul Bullock III	April 17, 2011	718	9.11
153	19	"The Lies Ill-Concealed"	Larry Shaw	David Schladweiler	April 24, 2011	719	10.15
154	20	"I'll Swallow Poison on Sunday"	David Warren	Jason Ganzel	May 1, 2011	720	9.44
155	21	"Then I Really Got Scared"	Larry Shaw	Valerie A. Brotski	May 8, 2011	721	10.00
156	22	"And Lots of Security..."	David Grossman	Joe Keenan	May 15, 2011	722	10.25
157	23	"Come on Over for Dinner"	Larry Shaw	Bob Daily	May 15, 2011	723	10.25

=== Season 8 (2011–12) ===
No. overall	No. in season	Title	Directed by	Written by	Original release date	U.S. viewers (millions)
158	1	"Secrets That I Never Want to Know"	David Grossman	Bob Daily	September 25, 2011	9.93
159	2	"Making the Connection"	Tara Nicole Weyr	Matt Berry	October 2, 2011	9.16
160	3	"Watch While I Revise the World"	David Warren	John Paul Bullock III	October 9, 2011	8.63
161	4	"School of Hard Knocks"	David Grossman	Marco Pennette	October 16, 2011	8.27
162	5	"The Art of Making Art"	Lonny Price	Dave Flebotte	October 23, 2011	9.17
163	6	"Witch's Lament"	Tony Plana	Annie Weisman	October 30, 2011	9.28
164	7	"Always in Control"	Jeff Greenstein	Jeff Greenstein	November 6, 2011	8.78
165	8	"Suspicion Song"	Jennifer Getzinger	David Schaldweiler	November 13, 2011	9.29
166	9	"Putting It Together"	David Warren	Sheila Lawrence	December 4, 2011	8.20
167	10	"What's to Discuss, Old Friend"	David Grossman	Wendy Mericle	January 8, 2012	8.84
168	11	"Who Can Say What's True?"	Larry Shaw	Brian Tanen	January 15, 2012	7.91
169	12	"What's the Good of Being Good"	Ron Underwood	Jason Ganzel	January 22, 2012	7.48
170	13	"Is This What You Call Love?"	David Grossman	David Schladweiler & Valérie A. Brotski	February 12, 2012	6.40
171	14	"Get Out of My Life"	James Hayman	Cindy Appel	February 19, 2012	7.65
172	15	"She Needs Me"	Randy Zisk	Jason Ganzel	March 4, 2012	8.21
173	16	"You Take for Granted"	Jeff Greenstein	Matt Berry	March 11, 2012	8.39
174	17	"Women and Death"	David Grossman	Annie Weisman	March 18, 2012	9.03
175	18	"Any Moment"	Randy Zisk	Sheila Lawrence	March 25, 2012	8.81
176	19	"With So Little to Be Sure Of"	Tara Nicole Weyr	Marco Pennette	April 1, 2012	8.49
177	20	"Lost My Power"	David Grossman	Wendy Mericle	April 29, 2012	8.02
178	21	"The People Will Hear"	David Warren	Brian Tanen	May 6, 2012	9.22
179	22	"Give Me the Blame"	Larry Shaw	Bob Daily	May 13, 2012	11.12
180	23	"Finishing the Hat"	David Grossman	Marc Cherry	May 13, 2012	11.12

== Specials ==
No.	Title	Narrators	Aired between	Original release date	Viewers (millions)
1	"Oprah Winfrey Is The New Neighbour"	Brenda Strong as Mary Alice Young	"Your Fault" (Episode 13) "Love Is In The Air" (Episode 14)	February 3, 2005	N/A
2	"Sorting Out The Dirty Laundry"	Tracy Fraim	"Live Alone And Like It" (Episode 19) "Fear No More" (Episode 20)	April 24, 2005	23.85
3	"All the Juicy Details"	Brenda Strong as Mary Alice Young	"Coming Home" (Episode 33) "One More Kiss"(Episode 34)	January 1, 2006	12.40
4	"The More You Know, The Juicer It Gets"	Brenda Strong as Mary Alice Young	"Don't Look At Me" (Episode 42) "It Wasn't Meant To Be"(Episode 43)	April 23, 2006	15.72
5	"Time To Come Clean"	Marc Cherry	"Remember (Part 2)" (Episode 47) "Listen To The Rain on the Roof"(Episode 48)	September 3, 2006	N/A
6	"The Juiciest Bites"	Brenda Strong as Mary Alice Young	"My Husband the Pig" (Episode 63) "Dress Big"(Episode 64)	April 1, 2007	9.87
7	"Secrets and Lies"	Brenda Strong as Mary Alice Young	"Getting Married Today" (Episode 70) "Now You Know"(Episode 71)	September 23, 2007	9.02

== Ratings ==
=== Seasons 1–4 ===
Desperate Housewives : U.S. viewers per episode (millions)

Season	Episode number																							
Season	1	2	3	4	5	6	7	8	9	10	11	12	13	14	15	16	17	18	19	20	21	22	23	24
1	21.65	20.03	20.87	21.49	22.14	24.60	24.21	27.24	21.56	22.34	25.20	24.09	25.95	22.30	24.19	24.08	24.61	25.55	25.27	25.69	26.10	25.28	30.62	–
2	28.36	27.11	26.06	25.78	25.22	23.93	25.93	25.92	25.89	25.52	23.72	22.52	25.33	23.47	23.41	22.20	21.41	21.82	20.02	21.30	21.33	21.03	24.23	24.23
3	24.09	21.42	20.96	20.64	19.71	21.24	22.65	22.27	21.63	21.43	18.71	16.76	17.14	18.10	18.51	18.31	15.93	16.35	15.91	17.17	17.16	16.13	18.82	–
4	19.32	17.82	18.89	18.21	18.28	18.58	18.63	18.64	20.65	19.78	16.37	15.75	16.35	16.76	15.43	16.84	16.84	–						

Audience measurement performed by Nielsen Media Research

=== Seasons 5–8 ===
Desperate Housewives : U.S. viewers per episode (millions)

Season	Episode number																							
Season	1	2	3	4	5	6	7	8	9	10	11	12	13	14	15	16	17	18	19	20	21	22	23	24
5	18.68	15.69	15.51	15.49	15.95	15.93	15.85	16.84	15.81	16.09	14.39	13.79	13.08	13.82	14.01	13.65	14.60	14.75	13.85	13.64	13.49	12.29	13.96	13.96
6	13.64	14.64	13.42	13.68	14.18	14.08	13.80	14.72	12.78	14.86	15.35	14.03	11.32	11.44	10.92	10.89	12.01	10.84	10.62	11.29	12.12	11.36	12.75	–
7	13.06	13.23	12.38	12.67	12.16	11.10	12.72	11.92	11.36	11.60	12.19	12.83	10.25	9.20	10.58	11.35	9.05	9.11	10.15	9.44	10.00	10.25	10.25	–
8	9.93	9.16	8.63	8.27	9.17	9.28	8.78	9.29	8.20	8.84	7.91	7.48	6.40	7.65	8.21	8.39	9.03	8.81	8.49	8.02	9.22	11.12	11.12	–

Audience measurement performed by Nielsen Media Research
