= The 5 Mrs. Buchanans =

- Genre: Sitcom
- Created by: Marc Cherry; Jamie Wooten
- Starring: Judith Ivey; Beth Broderick; Harriet Sansom Harris; Charlotte Ross; Eileen Heckart
- Composer: Steven Cahill
- Country of origin: United States
- Original language: English
- No. of seasons: 1
- No. of episodes: 17

Production
- Production location: Fox Television Center
- Running time: 30 minutes
- Production companies: Wooten And Cherry Productions; 20th Century Fox Television

Original release
- Network: CBS
- Release: September 24, 1994 – March 25, 1995

The 5 Mrs. Buchanans is an American television sitcom that aired on CBS from September 24, 1994 to March 25, 1995. Set in the fictional town of Mercy, Indiana, the show centers on the small-town misadventures of four diverse women with one thing in common: their loathing for their monster of a mother-in-law.

== Overview ==
The unofficial leader of the group is Alexandria (Judith Ivey), a Jewish 1970s crusader from New York City, who settled down and had a son, Chris, soon after marrying future high school principal Roy Buchanan (John Getz). Everyone regularly convenes in their home and at the thrift store that she owns. Vivian (Harriet Sansom Harris) is trapped in a stagnant marriage to used car salesman Ed Buchanan (Richard Poe), which is exacerbated by their hellion twin sons, Lyndon and PJ. Delilah (Beth Broderick) is a sweet, ditsy former Texas stripper who fell in love with church preacher Rev. Charles Buchanan (Mark Moses). These ladies are pulled together for various family and social functions, and they've forged deep bonds despite their distinctively different personalities. New to the family is Bree (Charlotte Ross), a Californian and former Disneyland employee who had a whirlwind romance with Jesse Buchanan (Tommy Hinkley) during his vacation at the theme park. And always meddling in their lives is Mother Emma Buchanan (Eileen Heckart), a gravelly-voiced, stoic, passive-aggressive gargoyle of a woman who commands the ceaseless devotion and adoration of her four sons.

== Cast ==
=== Main ===
- Judith Ivey as Alexandria "Alex" Isaacson Buchanan – A former feminist from a Jewish family in New York City, she owns an antique store. She is married to Roy Buchanan, the eldest son and they have a grown son, Chris. She is the oldest of the four women, and usually the most level-headed and mature. Her relationship with Mother Buchanan ranges from the civil, to absolute hatred, which, when coupled with snide remarks on both parts, makes for an amusing battleground.
- Beth Broderick as Delilah Buchanan – Originally from Corpus Christi, Texas, she is portrayed as a blonde stereotype: ditzy, usually wearing lots of makeup and revealing clothing. She is married to Rev. Charles Buchanan, the preacher, and becomes Head of the Ladies Auxiliary. Her dimness often evokes exasperation in the other women, however, she maintains a close relationship with each. Her past as a stripper often causes obstacles, but her caring nature serves to resolve them.
- Harriet Sansom Harris as Vivian Buchanan – A Republican housewife with hooligan twin sons, Lyndon and PJ from her marriage to her high school sweetheart, Ed Buchanan, she is shown as being rather neurotic, and narcissistic. She sometimes clashes with the politically liberal Alex but they generally get along. Her extreme antics (such as selling pints of her own blood to buy a dress for a Dan Quayle dinner) are often a point of humor. Her relationship with Mother Buchanan is shown to be the most antagonistic.
- Charlotte Ross as Bree Larson Buchanan – A Californian and ex-Disneyland worker, her whirlwind romance and marriage to Jesse Buchanan serves as the opening of the series. Characterized as quite naive and childish, she displays overt vanity, which, when coupled with her superb performance skills and fascination with dead bodies, makes for comedy. Eventually becoming a core part of the family, she succeeds in gaining the ladies' respect by standing with them against Mother Buchanan.
- Eileen Heckart as "Mother" Emma Buchanan – A former aspiring doctor who was forced to raise her four sons alone after her husband left her for a younger woman. She uses this as a vehicle to fuel her manipulation and dislike of her daughters-in-law to the point of buying them fake engagement rings to save money. While she is displayed as the hardened and merciless matriarch, her compassionate side is shown throughout the series, proving that under her tough exterior, she is ultimately a mother, something to which all the women can relate.

=== Recurring ===
- John Getz as Roy Buchanan
- Mark Moses as Rev. Charles Buchanan
- Richard Poe as Ed Buchanan
- Tommy Hinkley as Jesse Buchanan (episodes 2–15; played by Paul Johansson in the pilot)

== Episodes ==
No.	Title	Directed by	Written by	Original release date	Prod. code	Viewers (millions)
1	"Pilot"	David Trainer	Jamie Wooten & Marc Cherry	September 24, 1994	2B79	15.4
Alexandria, Vivian, and Delilah Buchanan, married to three of the four brothers, learn that the youngest brother, Jesse, is marrying his girlfriend after only knowing her six weeks. They welcome their soon-to-be sister-in-law, Bree, into the family. Their mean mother in law, Emma Buchanan, wants Bree to wear her wedding dress, like the others did, but she refuses. She has her first fight with Jesse about it and Alexandria explains the family dynamics to Bree and she and Jesse reconcile. At their wedding, Bree wears her own wedding dress with her new mother-in-law's veil.
2	"The Other Woman"	David Trainer	Jamie Wooten & Marc Cherry	October 1, 1994	2B01	15.2
After moving in with Alex and Roy, Bree comes to suspect that Jesse is secretly spending time with another woman. When it turns out to be Mother Buchanan, the ladies coach Bree to confront her.
3	"Clyde and Vivian and Ed and Malice"	David Trainer	John Pardee & Joey Murphy	October 8, 1994	2B03	13.6
Feeling that the romance is gone from her marriage to Ed, Vivian considers an affair with her cultured college boyfriend and gets caught by Mother Buchanan.
4	"A Ring of Truth"	Linda Day	John Pardee	October 15, 1994	2B04	14.5
When the stone on Bree's engagement ring becomes loose, Vivian has her visit her jeweler, and she is devastated after she learns the stone is fake. Afterward, Vivian's jeweler checks the others' engagement rings, and learn that they're fake, too. When they confront Mother Buchanan about it, she confesses that they're love tokens, because she didn't have the money to afford real diamonds.
5	"Nothing on Delilah"	Philip Charles MacKenzie	David Flebotte	October 22, 1994	2B02	13.1
Delilah's past as a stripper comes back to haunt her and Mother Buchanan is forced to intervene.
6	"The Mothers-in-Law"	Linda Day	Tracy Gamble & Richard Vaczy	October 29, 1994	2B05	12.5
Frances "Tink" Larson, Bree's mother, comes to visit, and butts heads with Mother Buchanan - especially after she wants Bree and Jesse to move to California to be with her. Bree and Jesse refuse and stay in Indiana.
7	"Alex, Then and NOW"	Linda Day	Jenny Bicks	October 31, 1994	2B07	17.8
Note: Aired on Monday. Alex is reunited with two former college friends, and decides to do something meaningful after feeling like a failure.
8	"Spare the Rod, Spoil the Buchanan"	John Sgueglia	Nancylee Myatt	November 16, 1994	2B09	14.4
After Vivian's twin sons hurt Bree while she's babysitting them, Vivian decides she's had enough of their monstrous behavior and spanks them. Unfortunately, she ends up in jail accused of child abuse. Note: Aired on Wednesday.
9	"Five Buchanans and a Baby"	Linda Day	Tracy Gamble & Richard Vaczy	November 26, 1994	2B06	12.8
Emma Buchanan is upset that Bree is not yet pregnant, and Delilah wants one of her sisters-in-law to be a surrogate mother after learning she and Charles have only a 10% chance of becoming pregnant.
10	"Emma in Love"	John Sgueglia	Tracy Gamble & Richard Vaczy	December 3, 1994	2B11	12.8
Emma Buchanan falls in love with the new town baker without knowing he's already married.
11	"What Child Is This"	Linda Day	Michael Patrick King	December 10, 1994	2B12	13.1
Alex accidentally breaks Mother Buchanan's baby Jesus heirloom, and Bree decorates Alex's house for Christmas.
12	"The Incredible Journey"	Linda Day	Joey Murphy & John Pardee	December 17, 1994	2B13	13.0
Alex's beloved dog returns home to die years after he disappeared in the Grand Canyon, and she learns the shocking truth on how he escaped.
13	"All About Bree"	Linda Day	Lyn Greene & Richard Levine	January 7, 1995	2B14	12.0
Delilah wants to play Mary in the local stage version of "The Sound of Music," but Bree gets the part, and Mother Buchanan plays Mother Superior.
14	"The Heart of the Matter"	David Trainer	Nancylee Myatt	January 14, 1995	2B10	13.0
Alex wants Roy to drop out of a football game because of his heart, but at Mother Buchanan's request, refuses and has a heart attack. Alex and Mother Buchanan fight over Roy at the hospital.
15	"Becoming a Buchanan"	John Sgueglia	Nancylee Myatt	January 21, 1995	2B15	11.9
Emma Buchanan has her sons and daughters-in-law pose with her for a family portrait. While waiting, Alexandria, Vivian, and Delilah share with Bree their horror stories on how they first met Mother Buchanan, with Delilah having the worst story of all. Afterward, everyone gets together to pose for the family portrait.
16	"Never on the Road Again"	Linda Day	David Flebotte	March 11, 1995	2B16	12.4
Emma Buchanan forces her daughters-in-law to join her at the funeral of Great Aunt Velma Buchanan, who died from weighing 650 pounds and being housebound because of it. Not only is it the road trip from hell, but the funeral itself showed a giant crate for a casket, and all five Buchanan women laughed hysterically at the funeral director's words.
17	"Viv'acious"	Linda Day	David Flebotte	March 25, 1995	2B08	10.8
The sisters-in-law throw a "naughty nighties" party to help Vivian improve her sex life with Ed.

The 5 Mrs. Buchanans regularly aired on Saturday nights on CBS, though one episode of the series aired as part of CBS's Monday night comedy lineup, and another episode aired on a Wednesday.

== Production ==
Original unaired pilot: The Four Mrs. Buchanans

The show was titled The Four Mrs. Buchanans in the original series pilot, referring to only the four daughters-in-law. The opening scene was completely revised and reshot and a pair of jokes about Delilah's skimpy dress were replaced with alternate one-liners about her heavy makeup when the pilot was broadcast as The 5 Mrs. Buchanans.

With an initial series order of 13 episodes, shortly after its premiere CBS announced it had given the series a five-episode pick-up. However, only 17 episodes were aired and are known to have been produced.

Eileen Heckart stated in an interview at the time that CBS had picked up more episodes of the show with the intention of moving it from Saturday nights, where it was faltering, to Mondays following Murphy Brown. The network ultimately changed its mind after ordering Cybill as a mid-season replacement, though the seventh episode of The 5 Mrs. Buchanans did air once in this timeslot as a "special preview" on October 31, 1994.
