= The Crew (1995 TV series) =

American sitcom

- Genre: Sitcom
- Created by: Jamie Wooten; Marc Cherry; John Pardee; Joey Murphy
- Starring: Rose Jackson; Kristin Bauer; David Burke; Charles Esten; Dondré Whitfield; Christine Estabrook; Lane Davies
- Composer: Steven Cahill
- Country of origin: United States
- Original language: English
- No. of seasons: 1
- No. of episodes: 21

Production
- Executive producers: Marc Cherry; Jamie Wooten
- Producers: Joey Murphy; John Pardee; Jordan Reed; Jason Shubb
- Running time: 22 minutes (approx.)
- Production companies: Wooten & Cherry Productions; 20th Century Fox Television

Original release
- Network: Fox
- Release: August 31, 1995 – June 30, 1996

The Crew is an American sitcom television series that aired on Fox from August 31, 1995, to June 30, 1996.

== Premise ==
The show follows the lives of a group of flight attendants working for the fictitious Regency Airlines. Jess Jameson and Maggie Reynolds work together and are roommates in the trendy South Beach section of Miami Beach, Florida. Their other friends include Paul, who is gay; Randy, a southern ladies' man; Lenora, a former flight attendant; MacArthur, the bartender of Mambo Mambo, the restaurant at which the cast socialize; and Captain Rex Parker.

== Cast ==
- Rose Jackson as Jess Jameson
- Kristin Bauer as Maggie Reynolds
- David Burke as Paul Steadman
- Charles Esten as Randy Anderson
- Dondré Whitfield as MacArthur 'Mac' Edwards
- Christine Estabrook as Lenora Zwick, Flight Crew Supervisor
- Lane Davies as Captain Rex Parker

== Production history ==
The series was created by Marc Cherry, Jamie Wooten, John Pardee and Joey Murphy, with Cherry and Wooten as executive producers. Music production team Wendy Melvoin and Lisa Coleman, aka Wendy & Lisa, produced and sang the opening title for the series.

== Episodes ==
No.	Title	Directed by	Written by	Original release date	Prod. code
1	"The New Pilot, Literally"	Steve Zuckerman	Marc Cherry, Jamie Wooten, John Pardee & Joey Murphy	August 31, 1995	3W01
2	"The Dating Game"	Steve Zuckerman	Joey Murphy & John Pardee	September 7, 1995	3W03
3	"The Operation"	Linda Day	Maxine Lapiduss	September 14, 1995	3W02
4	"P is for Paul"	Linda Day	Tim Schlattmann	September 21, 1995	3W04
5	"The Sugar Shack"	Jim Drake	Valerie Ahern & Christian McLaughlin	September 28, 1995	3W05
6	"Bar Mitzvah Boy"	John Sgueglia	Lynnie Greene & Richard Levine	October 5, 1995	3W06
7	"Who's Got the Button?"	John Sgueglia	Alison Taylor	October 5, 1995	3W07
8	"Invitation to a Wedding (Revised Pilot)"	James Widdoes	Marc Cherry, Jamie Wooten, Joey Murphy & John Pardee	October 19, 1995	3W79
9	"Goin' Hollywood"	John Sgueglia	Lynnie Greene & Richard Levine	November 2, 1995	3W08
10	"Around the World in 80 Ways"	Steve Zuckerman	Maxine Lapiduss	November 9, 1995	3W09
11	"Extremities"	Linda Day	Joey Murphy & John Pardee	November 16, 1995	3W10
12	"The Mating Season"	Steve Zuckerman	Lynnie Greene & Richard Levine	November 30, 1995	3W11
13	"The Worst Noel"	Lex Passaris	Valerie Ahern & Christian McLaughlin	December 14, 1995	3W12
14	"My Mother, My Sister"	Linda Day	Maxine Lapiduss	January 4, 1996	3W13
15	"A League of Their Own"	Linda Day	Lynnie Greene & Richard Levine	January 11, 1996	3W14
16	"Retail Slut"	Linda Day	Valerie Ahern & Christian McLaughlin	January 25, 1996	3W15
17	"The New Kids on the Block"	Jim Drake	Sarit Catz & Gloria Ketterer	May 26, 1996	3W17
18	"Love and Marriage"	Jim Drake	Sarit Catz & Gloria Ketterer	June 9, 1996	3W18
19	"Winds of Change: Part 1"	Amanda Bearse	John Pardee & Joey Murphy	June 16, 1996	3W19
20	"Winds of Change: Part 2"	Linda Day	John Pardee & Joey Murphy	June 23, 1996	3W20
21	"The Man We Love"	John Sgueglia	Robert Spina (Script Supervisor)	June 30, 1996	3W16

== Reception ==
Tom Shales for The Washington Post gave the show a negative review, calling it a clone of NBC's Friends.
