= Jamie Gorenberg =

American television producer and writer

Jamie Gorenberg is an American television producer and writer. Her most prominent work is on ABC's dramedy, Desperate Housewives. She began working on the series as a producer and screenwriter in 2007 during the series' fourth season. She also worked, as a writer on Dharma & Greg and Kristin, and a producer and writer on Related and Hart of Dixie. She is married and became an advocate for lung cancer awareness following her mother's diagnosis in 2007.
