= Susan Nirah Jaffee =

American screenwriter and television producer

Susan Nirah Jaffee is an American screenwriter and television producer, who primarily worked on sit-coms, serving as writer and producer for Desperate Housewives in 2006.

Beginning as an episode writer and story editor for Cybill in 1997, and remaining on the show for its last two seasons, she later worked as an executive story editor for Sex and the City, and a writer for Movie Stars, Maybe It's Me, and One on One, the later which she also produced.

In 2006, she joined the crew of Desperate Housewives as a supervising producer and writer for the third season of the show.
