= Joey Murphy =

American screenwriter and television producer

- Born: United States
- Occupations: Producer, Writer

Joey Murphy is an American screenwriter and television producer.

Murphy has written episodes of the cartoon, Doug, The Crew, and Cybill Shepherd's sitcom, Cybill, the last two for which he also served as producer. He also collaborated with Marc Cherry on the sitcom, The Five Mrs. Buchanans. When Desperate Housewives began in 2004, Murphy was one of the staff writers, and for the second year, he was promoted to co-executive producer. Starting with the first episode of season four, he was executive producer. Throughout his career, Murphy has worked with John Pardee, and the two also have written the script to the upcoming remake of Mad Monster Party?.

== Filmography ==
=== Producer ===
- The Crew (Producer, unknown episodes)
- Cybill (Supervising producer, 8 episodes, 1997–1998; consulting producer 5 episodes, 1997)
- Desperate Housewives (Co-executive producer, 38 episodes, 2005–2007; executive producer, 14 episodes, 2007–2008; consulting producer, 7 episodes, 2004–2005)

=== Writer ===
- Doug (1 episode, 1991)
- The 5 Mrs. Buchanans (3 episodes, 1994)
- The Crew (2 episodes, 1995)
- Cybill (1 episode, 1997)
- Desperate Housewives (12 episodes, 2004–2008)
- Mad Monster Party (2008)
