= John Pardee =

American screenwriter

- Born: United States
- Occupations: Television producer, Writer

John Pardee is an American screenwriter and television producer, and was an executive producer for Desperate Housewives.

During the 1990s, Pardee wrote episodes of several television series, including the cartoon Doug; the short-lived sitcoms Charlie Hoover, Thunder Alley, and The Crew; and Cybill Shepherd's sitcom Cybill. On The Crew and Cybill he also served as producer. When Desperate Housewives began in 2004, Pardee was one of the staff writers, and for the second year he was promoted to co-executive producer. Starting with the first episode of season four, he is now executive producer.

Pardee mostly works with Joey Murphy. The two wrote the script to the upcoming remake of Mad Monster Party.

He is close friends with Christian McLaughlin and Valerie Ahern.
