= Now You Know (Desperate Housewives) =

- Desperate Housewives episode
- Episode no.: Season 4 Episode 1
- Directed by: Larry Shaw
- Written by: Marc Cherry
- Production code: 401
- Original air date: September 30, 2007
- Running time: 43 minutes

Guest appearances
- Nathan Fillion as Adam Mayfair; Kathryn Joosten as Karen McCluskey; Julia Campbell as Muriel; Polly Bergen as Stella Wingfield; John Slattery as Victor Lang; Pat Crawford Brown as Ida Greenberg; Darian Pinkerton as Penny Scavo; Coley Sohn as Nurse; Zachary Gordon as Little Boy; Gil Glasgow as Man; Pamela Kosh as Mrs. McKeever; Jim Klock as Security Guard

Episode chronology
| ← Previous "Getting Married Today" | Next → "Smiles of a Summer Night" |
- Desperate Housewives season 4

"Now You Know" is the fourth season premiere episode of the American comedy-drama series, Desperate Housewives, and the 71st episode overall. The episode premiered on American Broadcasting Company (ABC) on September 30, 2007. It was written by series creator Marc Cherry and directed by Larry Shaw.

In the episode, Susan (Teri Hatcher) learns that she is expecting a child while Bree (Marcia Cross) continues to fake her own pregnancy. Gabrielle (Eva Longoria) begins an affair with her ex-husband, Carlos (Ricardo Antonio Chavira) and Lynette (Felicity Huffman) tries to conceal her cancer from her friends and children. The episode also introduces Katherine Mayfair (Dana Delany), Susan's old friend who returns to the neighborhood after being away for 12 years.

"Now You Know" drew over 19 million viewers, becoming the fourth most watched program of the week across all networks. Nevertheless, it was the least watched Desperate Housewives season premiere at the time. The episode received positive reviews from critics, who agreed that the episode showed significant improvement over the show's third season. Critics also praised the addition of Delany to the cast. ABC and the show's producers received viewer backlash due to an alleged slur against Filipino doctors included in the episode.

== Plot ==
=== Background ===
Desperate Housewives focuses on the residents living in the suburban neighborhood of Wisteria Lane. In previous episodes, Bree Hodge (Marcia Cross) sends her pregnant teenage daughter, Danielle (Joy Lauren), to a convent and fakes her own pregnancy. Bree plans to raise Danielle's child as her own. Lynette Scavo (Felicity Huffman) is diagnosed with Hodgkin's lymphoma. Susan Mayer (Teri Hatcher) and Mike Delfino (James Denton) marry while Carlos Solis (Ricardo Antonio Chavira) breaks up with Edie Britt (Nicollette Sheridan), leading her to seemingly hang herself. Gabrielle Solis (Eva Longoria) marries Mayor Victor Lang (John Slattery); however, after overhearing him confess that he only married her to secure the Latino vote for his potential candidacy in the election for governor, she seeks comfort with Carlos, her ex-husband.

=== Episode ===
Edie's suicide attempt is revealed to be a ploy to manipulate Carlos into staying in their relationship; however, when Carlos does not show up in time to rescue her, she almost dies. He brings her to the hospital and is forced to call off plans to run away with Gabrielle.

One month later, former Wisteria Lane resident Katherine Mayfair (Dana Delany) moves back to the neighborhood after twelve years of absence with her husband, Adam (Nathan Fillion), and teenage daughter, Dylan (Lyndsy Fonseca). Katherine had known Susan before moving away under mysterious circumstances. Susan's daughter, Julie (Andrea Bowen), is puzzled to learn that Dylan has no recollection of their childhood friendship or of her life on Wisteria Lane. Later, in a cryptic conversation, Adam asks Katherine if they made a mistake in moving back, and Katherine reminds him that they did not have a choice.

Lynette and her husband, Tom (Doug Savant), have been keeping her cancer a secret from their children and friends. She wears a wig to hide her baldness from the chemotherapy. Muriel (Julia Campbell), an uptight PTA mother, nags Lynette to organize a school event, forcing Lynette to reveal her illness to everyone. After recovering from her suicide attempt, Edie discovers that Carlos has $10 million in an offshore bank account. She promises he can trust her with the secret, just as she can trust him not to break her heart. Meanwhile, Victor confronts Gabrielle about her unwillingness to sell her house and commit to their marriage. Dissatisfied with their relationships, Carlos and Gabrielle reignite an affair.

Bree and her husband, Orson (Kyle MacLachlan), find it increasingly difficult to stage her fake pregnancy. Their hoax is almost revealed at a neighborhood barbecue when a fork stabs her pregnancy stomach pads. Orson suggests coming clean to avoid the humiliation if their lies were to be discovered, but Bree tells him that this child is her second chance at successfully raising a child. Meanwhile, Susan worries that Mike is dissatisfied with their marriage, especially after Adam, her new gynecologist, reveals that she may be entering menopause. However, Adam later informs Susan that his earlier assessment was a mistake and that she is pregnant.

== Production ==
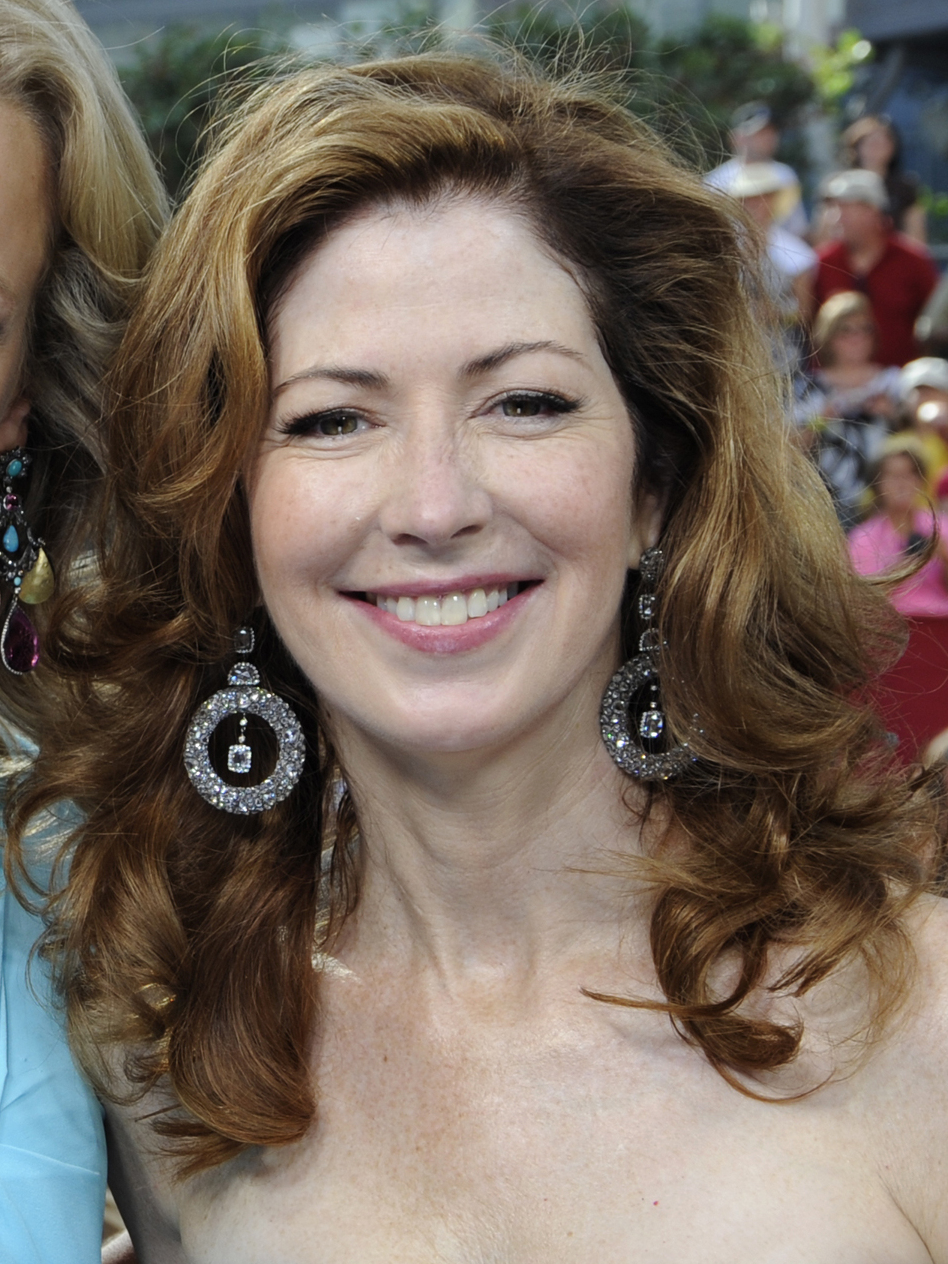
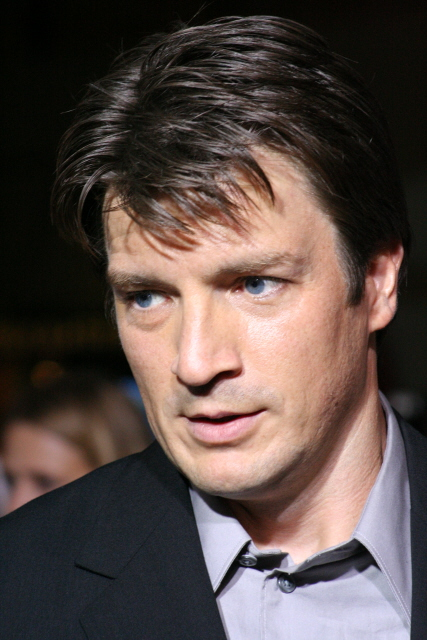
Delany (left) and Fillion (right) made their first appearance in "Now You Know" as Katherine and Adam Mayfair, a married couple with a mysterious secret.

"Now You Know" was written by series creator Marc Cherry and directed by Larry Shaw. The episode featured the debut of Dana Delany as Katherine Mayfair, a former Wisteria Lane resident who moves back to the neighborhood. Cherry describes the character as "a woman who was clearly different in the past ... an alpha female who goes up against all-out women, especially Bree." Cherry developed Katherine with the intention of making her "a character everyone loves to hate," citing J. R. Ewing (Larry Hagman) from Dallas and Amanda Woodward (Heather Locklear) from Melrose Place as inspirations. Cherry ensured that character would have "a comedic point of view," unlike the Betty Applewhite (Alfre Woodard) character from the series' second season, stating: "In the second season we went to the mystery that was just kind of dark and stopped the action. [This time] we're using humor, drama, pathos, everything [the Mayfairs] have to offer."

Delany auditioned for the role of Bree for the series' pilot episode in 2004. Cherry offered her the role three times, but she rejected it, and Marcia Cross was hired soon after. Delany turned down the role because she believed the Bree character was too similar to her character on Pasadena. Cherry acknowledged that while Delany captured the slyness he had originally intended for the character, Cross ultimately became the better choice: "Marcia, who will be the first to tell you, 'I'm not funny, I never get the joke,' her Bree was kind of oblivious to her own Breeness. Interestingly enough, when we went forward with the show, it became a much funnier character than I envisioned." While developing the Katherine character, Cherry immediately offered the role to Delany. "That's unusual in Hollywood," Delany commented. "Usually when you say 'no,' they hold it against you for the rest of your career. I've experienced that."

Cherry offered Nathan Fillion the role of Katherine's second husband, Adam. Fillion was asked to choose what type of doctor his character would be. He recalled, "I said I'd be a gynecologist so I could interact with all the women." Known mostly for his work in the sci-fi genre, Fillion considered his role on Desperate Housewives a return to his roots, as he had acted on the soap opera One Life to Live earlier in his career. Tuc Watkins auditioned for the role and was cast as Bob Hunter on the series a few weeks later. Lyndsy Fonseca joined the cast as Katherine's daughter, Dylan. Fonseca stated that her character's mother keeps Dylan "on a rigorous schedule and a short leash. Almost like a dog."

The episode continued Lynette's cancer storyline, which Cherry intended to be both emotional and comical. He notes, "we established from very early on that she's suffering from non-Hodgkin's lymphoma, so we never once let the audience think she's going to die. It's more about examining how your friends and family react to you when you're sick."

From this episode forward, a synthesized version of Danny Elfman’s theme is heard in the brief main title sequence, as arranged and performed by series composer Steve Jablonsky.

== Reception ==
=== Awards ===
Marcia Cross submitted this episode for consideration of her work for Outstanding Lead Actress in a Comedy Series for the 60th Primetime Emmy Awards. She was placed in the Top 10, but did not garner a nomination.

=== Viewership and ratings ===
According to ABC, "Now You Know" was watched by 19.32 million viewers. It held a 12.2 rating/18 share, the night's best rating across all networks, and placed as the fourth most-watched program of the week, behind CSI on CBS, and Dancing with the Stars and Grey's Anatomy on ABC. "Now You Know" was the least-watched season premiere of Desperate Housewives at the time, drawing about five million fewer viewers than the third season premiere a year earlier, a 23 percent decrease in viewership. According to The New York Times, viewership was down due to an increase in DVR usage.

=== Critical ===
Entertainment Weekly's Tim Stack praised the Bree storyline, calling its scenes the best of the episode. He was critical of the Lynette storyline and highlighted its implausibility, calling it "a cop-out and just an excuse for drama." However, he appreciated the scene in which Lynette reveals her cancer to her friends. Stack enjoyed the addition of the Mayfair family, stating that although he was not a fan of Delany's acting, "seems perfect for this role and looks to be a choice adversary for Bree." He also praised the set-up for their mystery storyline. Stack was critical of the Edie character, opining: "She used to be funny and sexy, but now she's just a big loon." He dismissed Susan's storyline as "lame" and deemed the character "obnoxious." He also noted the significant absence of the Gabrielle character. Robert Bianco of USA Today declared that the show was "back in fine form." He called the episode amusing, opining that the episode "launched a plethora of promising stories while introducing welcome new residents Dana Delany and Nathan Fillion." TV Guide's Matt Roush enjoyed the episode, complimenting the addition of the new cast members. Regarding the Katherine character, he wrote, "while she's obviously harboring a dark secret, at least there's no one trapped in the basement," referencing the Betty Applewhite storyline from the second season. He identified the Susan and Mike storyline as problematic, as "She's so annoying, and he's so boring." Roush also noted that Felicity Huffman was "making the most of her cancer storyline."

=== Filipino controversy ===
Following the episode's broadcast, the show's producers and ABC were criticized for including an alleged racial slur in the episode. In the scene in which the Susan character is informed she may be entering menopause, she replies: "OK, before we go any further, can I check these diplomas? Just to make sure they aren't, like, from some med school in the Philippines?" Viewers called ABC to complain and an online petition had gathered 30,000 signatures by October 3, 2007, three days after the episode's original broadcast. Several politicians and medical professionals of Filipino descent, including Health Secretary Francisco Duque III on Manila, condemned ABC for airing the line. On October 4, ABC announced that the episode had been removed from online platforms in order for the line to be removed; the line was also removed from future broadcasts and DVD productions of the episode. Nevertheless, network boycotts and other forms of protest continued.
