= Listen to the Rain on the Roof =

- Desperate Housewives episode
- Episode no.: Season 3 Episode 1
- Directed by: Larry Shaw
- Written by: Marc Cherry; Jeff Greenstein
- Production code: 301
- Original air date: September 24, 2006
- Running time: 44 minutes

Guest appearances
- Dougray Scott as Ian Hainsworth; Kathryn Joosten as Karen McCluskey; Laurie Metcalf as Carolyn Bigsby; Gwendoline Yeo as Xiao-Mei; Kiersten Warren as Nora Huntington; Valerie Mahaffey as Alma Hodge; Terry Bozeman as Dr. Lee Craig; Rachel Fox as Kayla Huntington; Vernée Watson Johnson as ER Doctor; Jeanne Sakata as Li Wang; Mike Baldridge as Guy; Charlie Dell as Older Man; Dennis W. Hall as Clown; Michael Krepack as Boy with face paint; Cecily Gambrell as Jane Hainsworth

Episode chronology
← Previous "Remember"	Next → "It Takes Two"
- Desperate Housewives season 3

"Listen to the Rain on the Roof" is the third season premiere episode of the American comedy-drama series Desperate Housewives, and the 48th episode overall. The episode premiered on ABC (American Broadcasting Company) on September 24, 2006. It was written by series creator Marc Cherry and series writer Jeff Greenstein, and was directed by Larry Shaw.

The episode takes place six months after the events in the second season. In the episode, Bree (Marcia Cross) becomes engaged to Orson Hodge (Kyle MacLachlan), who is accused of murdering his missing wife by his former neighbor, Carolyn Bigsby (Laurie Metcalf). Meanwhile, Gabrielle (Eva Longoria) deals with the ramifications of her impending divorce and Lynette (Felicity Huffman) copes with her husband's illegitimate daughter and the girl's mother. Also, Susan (Teri Hatcher) meets a new man, Ian Hainsworth (Dougray Scott), while waiting for Mike (James Denton) to awaken from his coma.

According to Nielsen ratings, the episode drew just over 24 million viewers, indicating a 4 million viewer decrease from the previous season premiere a year earlier. The episode received mostly positive reviews. Critics complimented the six-month time jump and generally agreed that the episode showed improvement over the quality of the second season.

== Plot ==
=== Background ===
Desperate Housewives focuses on the lives of several residents living on Wisteria Lane in the town of Fairview. In previous episodes, Bree Van de Kamp (Marcia Cross) begins dating Orson Hodge (Kyle MacLachlan), a local dentist. Mike Delfino (James Denton) plans to propose to Susan Mayer (Teri Hatcher); however, Orson intentionally runs over Mike with his car and then flees the scene. Gabrielle (Eva Longoria) and Carlos Solis (Ricardo Antonio Chavira) elect their maid, Xiao-Mei (Gwendoline Yeo), as their surrogate. Afterwards, Gabrielle discovers that Carlos and Xiao-Mei are having an affair. Lynette Scavo (Felicity Huffman) learns that her husband, Tom (Doug Savant), fathered a child out of wedlock prior to their meeting. The girl, 11-year-old Kayla (Rachel Fox), and her mother, Nora (Kiersten Warren), move from Atlantic City to Fairview.

=== Episode ===
"Listen to the Rain on the Roof" takes place six months after the aforementioned events. Orson and Bree become engaged and, although they initially planned to wait until they were married to have sex, they are unable to overcome temptation. Bree visits the doctor immediately after, fearing that she may have suffered a stroke; her doctor informs her that Bree had just experienced her first orgasm. Later at the couple's engagement party, Orson's former neighbor, Carolyn Bigsby (Laurie Metcalf), arrives uninvited and accuses Orson of having killed his missing wife, Alma (Valerie Mahaffey). Despite a sense of doubt, Bree believes Orson when he denies Carolyn's claims. Later, the rain washes away mud at a construction site and uncovers a buried body.

Mike has been comatose since the hit-and-run. Dr. Lee Craig (Terry Bozeman) warns Susan that Mike will most likely not awaken from his coma, but she remains optimistic. She meets Ian Hainsworth (Dougray Scott), a British man whose wife, Jane (Cecily Gambrell), has been in a coma for several years. Ian asks Susan on a date, which forces her to face the unlikeliness of Mike recovering.

Gabrielle and Carlos are in the middle of a prolonged divorce. Carlos has moved into an apartment across town and Gabrielle is forced to care for Xiao-Mei, who is over eight months pregnant and on bed rest. During an argument, Gabrielle threatens to send Xiao-Mei back to China after she has the baby. Later, Gabrielle discovers that Xiao-Mei has run away and enlists Carlos' help to find her. The two bicker before acknowledging the challenges they will face while trying to raise a child as a divorced couple. Edie Britt (Nicollette Sheridan) finds Xiao-Mei in a house that she has been trying to sell and notifies the Solises.

Lynette is frustrated with Nora inviting herself to family events. To ensure that Nora does not show up to Parker's (Zane Huett) birthday party, Tom and Lynette tell her that they are having Kayla over for a quiet afternoon. Nora becomes suspicious and arrives at the party unannounced. She is furious over their deception and threatens to take Kayla home, but Tom tries to calm her by inviting Nora to stay. Lynette accuses Tom of putting Nora and Kayla ahead of the rest of the family, which encourages Tom to ask Nora to leave and pick up Kayla later. Eventually, Nora obliges.

== Production ==
"Listen to the Rain on the Roof" was written by series creator Marc Cherry and series writer Jeff Greenstein and directed by Larry Shaw. Cherry's decision to advance the storylines by six months for the third season premiere came as a response to the series' problematic second season. Cherry stated that he regretted most of the second season, as scheduling problems made it difficult to plan the season's storylines. "One of the problems I had with Season 2 was that I had to keep going with the previous year's stuff," he explained. "I learned you have to go back to square one to build up the tension again." The cast also expressed disappointment in the second season; James Denton considered leaving the show and Marcia Cross confessed: "I've been at Marc's door plenty of times [with script complaints] going, 'You've got to be kidding.'" Cherry stated that the six-month time jump would help the storylines develop quicker, as the second season's storylines lagged. He added: "And I'm going to work much harder to criss-cross all the women's stories so that their lives bump up against each other."

To help refresh the show, several new writers were hired, including Greenstein, Joe Keenan, who also served as an executive producer, and Bob Daily, who was also a producer. Daily commented, "When we came on in season three, the mandate was to bring the show back to its roots. That meant having plotlines spring from relatable experiences, no matter how operatic or convoluted." For the season's main mystery, Cherry and the writers wanted to incorporate more of the series' regular characters rather than bringing in various new ones, like they had done in the second season with Betty Applewhite (Alfre Woodard) and her family. They developed the Orson plot line around the "idea that one of our women marries a guy who has dark secrets and possibly a violent streak." Cherry opined: "I thought there was something exciting about that, but real and relatable." Greenstein commented that the writers worked backwards from the second season's cliffhangers to develop the Orson storyline, forsaking the original material that had been developed earlier. The cast responded positively to the new material for the season.

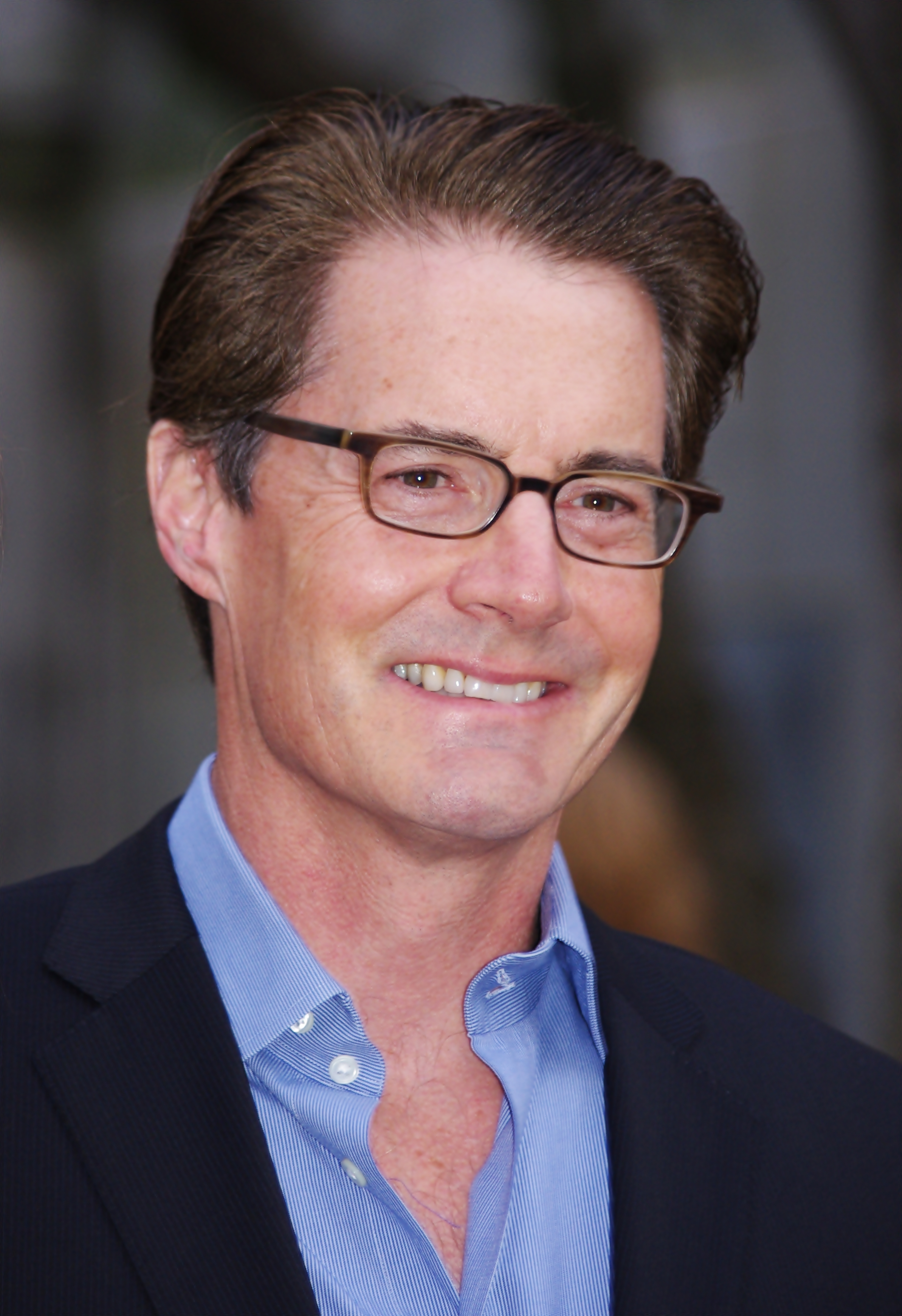
Kyle MacLachlan continued appearing as Orson Hodge, Bree's love interest. "Listen to the Rain on the Roof" introduced the character's mystery storyline.

The episode is the first to feature Kyle MacLachlan as a series regular. He originally appeared as Orson Hodge in a string of episodes at the end of the second season. The Orson character was originally planned as a romantic interest for Susan, according to executive producer Tom Spezialy, until Cherry decided to pair Orson with Bree. Additionally, when Orson was introduced toward the end of the second season, he was originally to be a con artist. A character portrayed by Julie White appeared in the second season finale and would have been Orson's accomplice, but the entire storyline was discarded in favor of the mysterious disappearance of Orson's wife and White's character was not seen or mentioned again. MacLachlan commented that his character is "desperate to make this relationship with Bree work. Anything that tries to knock that apart becomes a threat." Cherry called Orson Bree's perfect match, but added that their similarities "will ultimately prove to be the downfall of the relationship."

Kiersten Warren also returned to the series as Nora Huntington after being introduced at the end of the second season. On her storyline, Warren commented, "There's a lot of families who are going through this. Not quite the surprise ooh, boo, child, but children from other marriages and trying to meld these families. I think a lot of people have to deal with it. I think it's fantastic that they’re doing this on the show." Dougray Scott made his debut in this episode as Ian Hainsworth, Susan's romantic interest. Cherry opined that the character "can legitimately rival Mike for [Susan's] affections." Daily commented on the storyline, saying: "Talk about dark comedy — we're trying to find the humor in these two people bonding over the fact that they each have a partner in a coma." Scott called his character "bumbling at times," adding, "He kind of blossoms after he rediscovers his romantic juices with Susan."

== Reception ==
=== Ratings ===
According to ABC, "Listen to the Rain on the Roof" was watched by 24.09 million viewers, placing it as the second-most watched program of the week on all networks, behind ABC's Grey's Anatomy. According to Nielsen ratings, the episode received a 14.6 rating/21 share. The episode was watched by four million less viewers than the second season premiere a year earlier but managed to outperform the second season finale in May.

=== Critical reception ===
Unlike the second season's opener, which started that illadvised business in the basement and kept the women largely separated, this year's kickoff script, by series creator Marc Cherry and Jeff Greenstein, does everything right.

— David Bianculli, New York Daily News

David Kronke of the Los Angeles Daily News wrote that the show "returns to its wicked wit, dialing back but certainly not eradicating the melodrama." He complimented the four main actresses for their comedic relief and concluded: "Rarely does a show unjump the shark this well; it's back in fine form, calibrating its humor and its menace just right." New York Daily News writer David Bianculli compared the premiere to the show's second season, noting that the episode showed "an assurance and a knowing playfulness that was missing most of last year." He complimented Cherry and Greenstein's script and approved the storylines for each character. Bianculli opined that the episode returned the quality of the show's first season and concluded: "Pass the word: If you've given up on 'Desperate Housewives,' it's time to return to the neighborhood." Entertainment Weekly's Lindsay Soll identified Eva Longoria as the episode's strongest performer, declaring that she "definitely looks like the one to watch this season." Soll was glad to see that the Susan character was "a little more toned down and less accident-prone than usual," and called the scenes with Susan and Mike touching. Additionally, she opined that Laurie Metcalf "did a brilliant job of playing the classic TV nosy neighbor," but expressed her confusion over the Orson storyline.

Dave Anderson of TV Guide called the episode first-rate, while praising the comedic Bree storyline and declaring the set-up for the Orson mystery storyline ingenious. He commended Marcia Cross' performance but opined that Longoria provided the best comedic relief. He also complimented Teri Hatcher's acting, commenting that she "was awesome in the poignant scene where she asks the comatose Mike permission to go on the (almost) date with Ian." Anderson identified the Scavo storyline as "the weakest link" in the episode and hoped that the Nora and Kayla characters would not remain on the show for too long. TV Guide writer Matt Roush shared similar sentiments regarding the Scavo storyline, stating that while the premiere overall was good, "Lynette is trapped in a story line so desperately unamusing, one that makes her and everyone around her act so idiotic, that you have to pray that we'll soon see the last of the obnoxious Nora, mother of Tom's surprise daughter." He described the storyline as "painfully unpleasant and unfunny." However, Roush praised the performances of Metcalf and Valerie Mahaffey, while concluding that Desperate Housewives "shows encouraging signs of getting its act together." In a separate review, Roush unfavorably compared the Orson character to Bree's former love interest, George Williams (Roger Bart), while also admitting to being "a bit weary" of the Gabrielle storyline.

USA Today's Robert Bianco acknowledged that the episode managed to avoid repeating many of the second season's mistakes noting that the four main characters spend more time together and the annual mystery "is hot-wired into the housewives themselves." Bianco remarked that Cross successfully maintained her position as the series' most prominent lead and was pleased with Susan's storyline, calling it "a conflict that gives Teri Hatcher a genuinely funny, rather than forced, sight gag." He approved of the writers' decision to distance the characters from their second season storylines, but opined: "The harder mistake to overcome is the damage the show did to its main characters — allowing them to behave in ways that made them seem weak, selfish, stupid and, at times, despicable." Bianco concluded: "It will take more than one good episode to win us back after all that. But it's certainly a good place to start." Jen Creer of TV Squad was mixed in her review. She criticized the lack of originality in the storylines, writing that the episode was similar to Sex and the City. Nevertheless, Creer complimented the main actresses, concluding, "I'll be tuning in next week – for all of its camp and unoriginality, the show does continue to have that certain something, those little twists of genius that make it worth watching." Andy Dehnart of MSNBC was slightly more positive in his review, acknowledging that while "most of the housewives are stuck in their second-season ruts," the show's overall quality has improved, citing the Orson storyline as a welcomed change from the slow-moving Applewhite mystery arc. Overall, Dehnart approved of the episode and felt that the show "may be on track to finally pleasuring its audience in new, albeit familiar ways."
