= Desperate Housewives season 2 =

Desperate Housewives
- Season 2
- DVD Cover for Desperate Housewives Season 2
- Starring: Teri Hatcher; Felicity Huffman; Marcia Cross; Eva Longoria; Nicollette Sheridan; Alfre Woodard; Ricardo Antonio Chavira; Mark Moses; Andrea Bowen; Doug Savant; Cody Kasch; Richard Burgi; Brenda Strong; James Denton
- No. of episodes: 24

Release
- Original network: ABC
- Original release: September 25, 2005 – May 21, 2006

Season chronology
- ← Previous; Season 1 Next → Season 3

The second season of the American dramedy-mystery television series Desperate Housewives commenced airing in the United States on September 25, 2005, and concluded on May 21, 2006. The season continues the story of the Wisteria Lane residents, while their seemingly perfect lives in the suburban neighborhood are shaken by the arrival of the mysterious Betty Applewhite. Broadcast in the Sunday night time slot at 9.00 ET, the season aired twenty-four regular episodes, including a two-part season finale. In addition, three clip shows were produced for the season, in order to put the previous events of the show in perspective. "All the Juicy Details" aired before the eleventh episode, detailing the most memorable events of the season's first half, whereas "The More You Know, The Juicier It Gets", which aired before the twentieth episode, prepared the viewers for the highly anticipated season finale. "Time to Come Clean" aired three weeks before the inception of the third season, and reviewed the previous mysteries of the series before introducing the new story lines. The second season had fourteen roles receiving star billing, out of whom eleven were part of the first season's main cast. The main story lines of the season were Susan Mayer's relationship with her former husband, Gabrielle Solis' upcoming motherhood, Lynette Scavo's return to work and the death of Bree Van de Kamp's husband.

The season received mixed reviews from television critics, noting Marc Cherry's lack of involvement in the production as one of the main reasons for the series' decreasing quality. Cherry has since said that he regrets most of the second season and that ABC's decision to order an additional episode for the season forced the series to work on an abbreviated schedule. However, the main cast members, as well as the guest stars, received critical acclaim, resulting in numerous awards and nominations. The highest-rated episode of the season was the season premiere, watched by 28.36 million viewers, with a 10.1 rating, being the series' second highest-rated episode to date. Buena Vista Home Entertainment officially released the season on DVD in the United States and Canada on August 29, 2006.

== Production ==
Marc Cherry, Tom Spezialy, and Michael Edelstein returned as executive producers for the second season of the series. Screenwriter Kevin Murphy also returned to the series, this season as a co-executive producer alongside George W. Perkins, Chris Black, Joey Murphy and John Pardee. All but Edelstein and Pardee also served as writers. Season one writers Alexandra Cunningham, Jenna Bans, Kevin Etten, and Josh Senter were joined by new series writers Bruce Zimmerman, Dahvi Waller, Alan Cross, Ellie Herman, Jim Lincoln, and Scott Sanford Tobis. Bans and Senter also became story editors. Nine directors serviced Desperate Housewives, including season one directors Larry Shaw, David Grossman and Arlene Sanford. Wendey Stanzler, Robert Duncan McNeill, Pam Thomas, Randy Zisk, Stephen Cragg, and Tom Cherones directed episodes of the series for the first time during this season. Cherry left a majority of the season's writing to other staff members, which many critics faulted as the reason for the decreasing quality of the series. Edelstein left the series after the first thirteen episodes of the season, and Spezialy followed in May 2006. Cherry has since said that he regrets most of the second season and that ABC's decision to order an additional episode for the season forced the series to work on an abbreviated schedule. Cast member Teri Hatcher has also mentioned production problems during filming for the series' second season, including incomplete or delayed scripts, whereas fellow cast members Marcia Cross, James Denton, and Felicity Huffman have all expressed concerns of the series' declining quality both with the writing staff and the press. Colonial Street, which is the location of Wisteria Lane set for the series, went through additional changes prior to production on the second season. The cul-de-sac, known as "Circle Drive" by crew members, was heavily remodeled. Previously unseen in first season, "Circle Drive" contained a church facade, which was replaced by Edie Britt's second home, and the Colonial Mansion building, which was destroyed and replaced with a park for the series.

While developing storylines for the second season, series creator Marc Cherry stated, "I want to keep finding new ways to talk about issues that relate to everyday women," explaining that the show needs to focus on "small, real, everyday issues" in order to keep the audience interested. Cherry cited the Lynette storyline as an example of this strategy: "Lynette will be returning to her advertising roots next season, so I want to address how difficult it is to go to work all day and then come home and be expected to also take care of your house." Huffman recognized that her character's storylines needed a change of pace, but hoped that Lynette's domestic life would still play an integral role this season. "My hope is to not get lost in the corporate world; that it's still a home and family/husband and children story," she explained. "But how many times can you go, 'Kids, clear your plates!'" The season premiere introduced Lynette's new boss, Nina Fletcher, portrayed by Joely Fisher who describes her character as "nasty", elaborating: "Lynette suddenly has to come up against this tiger lady who never stops reminding Lynette that she's childless by choice. Even though Nina is not a housewife, she is desperate in her own way." Due to the death of his character, Steven Culp did not return to the series for the second season, but provided his face for the open casket scene in the season premiere, which saw the producers create a life mask of the actor. Doug Savant was promoted to series regular after appearing as a recurring guest star throughout the first season.

The season saw the promotion of Alfre Woodard and Mehcad Brooks to series regulars, after they were introduced in the final two episodes of the first season. Woodard played Betty Applewhite, a "deeply religious, overbearing single mother" while Mehcad portrayed her son, Matthew. In regards to the characters and their mystery storyline, Cherry stated: "They come on the street; they seem like nice people — but they've got a secret. And it's pretty gothic. It's real and human and awful all at the same time." Woodard commented that her character "never means harm... Let's just say she has flaws. She had to make some really tough decisions quick and if the law ever catches up with her, she'll have to serve time... But they'll never catch her." The final scene in which Betty and Matthew bring food to the prisoner in their basement was originally intended for the first-season finale but saved for "Next" instead. While the Applewhites are regarded as the first major black characters on the series, Cherry stated that the role of Betty was originally offered to two white film actresses, both of whom turned it down due to financial and time commitment issues. He clarified: "There's nothing strategically black about her character. Her color is incidental." Woodard stated that she had never seen the show before accepting the role, something that led the producers to send her fifteen episodes of the show, which she divided amongst various family members. After they compared storylines, Woodard recalled that she became "instantly hooked" on the series. Woodard reported experiencing heavy media attention after accepting the role. Both Brooks and his brother, Billy, auditioned for the role of Matthew. The final decision came down to both brothers as well as two other actors. According to Cherry, Brooks was cast because he exuded a "dangerous" element, as well as "a combination of this wholesome, sweet quality and a dark, brooding quality."

== Cast ==
=== Regular ===
==== Starring ====
- Teri Hatcher as Susan Mayer
- Felicity Huffman as Lynette Scavo
- Marcia Cross as Bree Van de Kamp
- Eva Longoria as Gabrielle Solis
- Nicollette Sheridan as Edie Britt
- Alfre Woodard as Betty Applewhite
- Ricardo Antonio Chavira as Carlos Solis
- Mark Moses as Paul Young
- Andrea Bowen as Julie Mayer
- Doug Savant as Tom Scavo
- Cody Kasch as Zach Young
- Richard Burgi as Karl Mayer
- Brenda Strong as Mary Alice Young
- James Denton as Mike Delfino

==== Also starring ====
- Shawn Pyfrom as Andrew Van de Kamp
- Joy Lauren as Danielle Van de Kamp
- Mehcad Brooks as Matthew Applewhite
- Brent Kinsman as Preston Scavo
- Shane Kinsman as Porter Scavo
- Zane Huett as Parker Scavo
- Page Kennedy as Caleb Applewhite (Note: Page Kennedy appears as a regular from 2x02 through 2x07.)
- NaShawn Kearse as Caleb Applewhite (Note: NaSahw Kearse appears as a regular from 2x08 through 2x24.)
- Roger Bart as George Williams (Note: Roger Bart appears as a regular from 2x02 through 2x08. In 2x24 he appears as a special guest star.)

=== Supporting ===
==== Recurring ====
- Currie Graham as Ed Ferrara
- Harriet Sansom Harris as Felicia Tilman
- Jay Harrington as Dr. Ron McCready
- Gwendoline Yeo as Xiao-Mei
- Ryan Carnes as Justin
- Kathryn Joosten as Karen McCluskey
- Charlie Babcock as Stu Durber
- Pat Crawford Brown as Ida Greenberg
- Joely Fisher as Nina Fletcher
- Kurt Fuller as Detective Barton
- Bob Gunton as Noah Taylor
- Alejandro Patino as Ralph
- Lee Tergesen as Peter McMillan
- Kyle MacLachlan as Orson Hodge
- Alejandro Patiño as Ralph the Gardener
- Jill Brennan as Tish Atherton
- Nick Chinlund as Detective Sullivan
- Jeff Doucette as Father Crowley
- Shirley Knight as Phyllis Van de Kamp
- Sam Lloyd as Dr. Albert Goldfine
- Jesse Metcalfe as John Rowland
- Betty Murphy as Alberta Fromme

==== Guest ====
- Steven Culp as Rex Van de Kamp
- Kiersten Warren as Nora Huntington
- Lesley Ann Warren as Sophie Bremmer
- Terry Bozeman as Dr. Lee Craig
- Maria Cominis as Mona Clarke
- Alec Mapa as Vern
- Dakin Matthews as Reverend Sikes

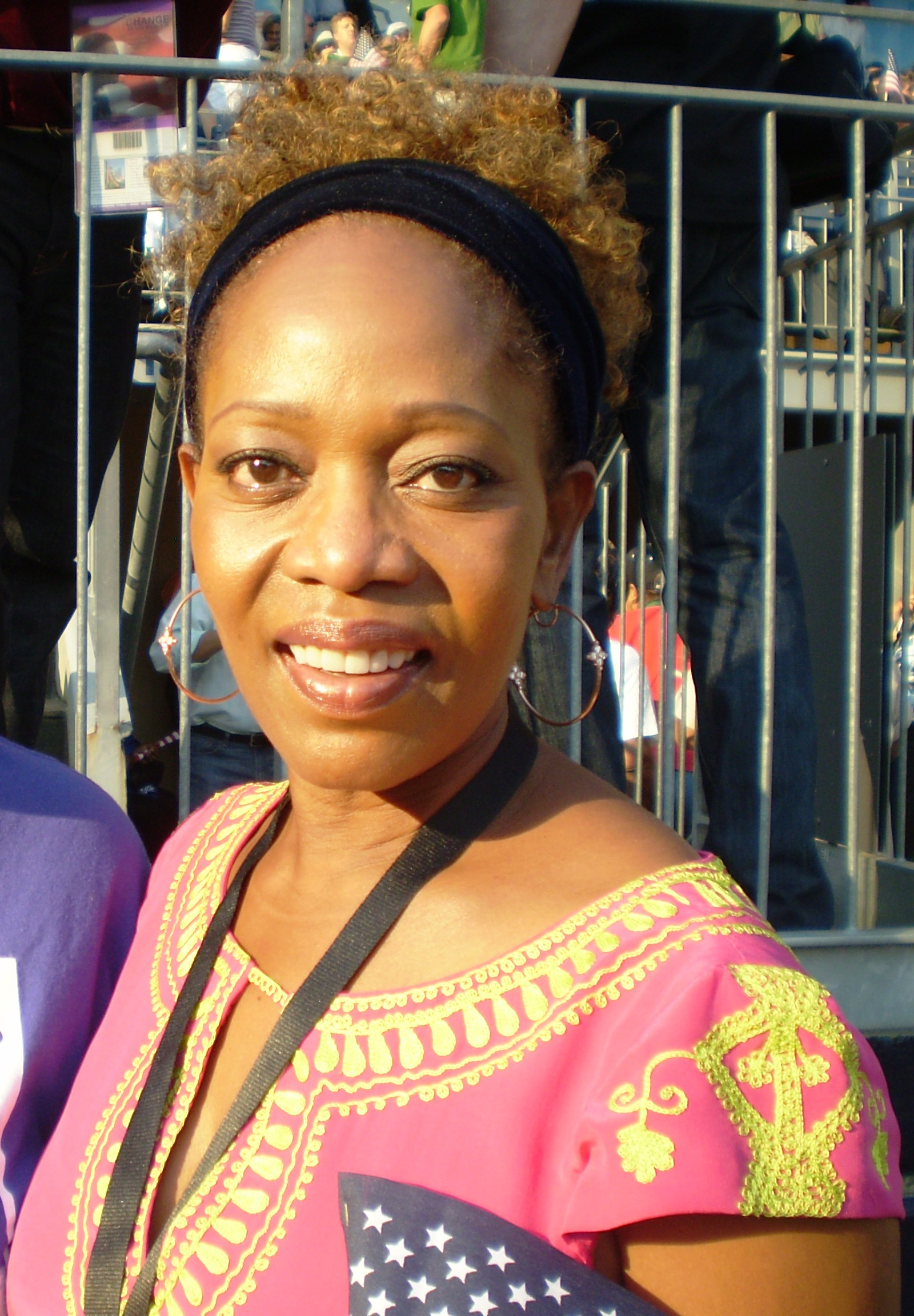
Woodard's character was the subject of the season's main mystery.

The second season had fourteen roles receiving star billing, out of whom eleven were part of the first season's main cast. The season sees the promotion of three former guest stars, who begin acting as series regulars from the season's first episode. The series is narrated by Brenda Strong, from the point of view of the deceased Mary Alice Young, as she observes, from a unique perspective, the lives of the Wisteria Lane residents and her former best friends. Susan Mayer, portrayed by Teri Hatcher, is divorcée and single mother, who, in her continuous search for a romantic commitment, ends up in bed with her former husband. Felicity Huffman portrayed Lynette Scavo, who starts neglecting her responsibilities as a mother, after the realization of her undeniable talent for advertising results in her going back to work after a six-year absence. Marcia Cross portrayed Bree Van de Kamp, whose flawless life is shaken after she starts dealing with the aftermath of her husband's death, while trying to overcome her guilt for having dated the man who killed him. Former model Gabrielle Solis, portrayed by Eva Longoria, who suffers a miscarriage just as she starts accepting upcoming motherhood. Nicollette Sheridan portrayed Edie Britt, whose commitment issues and numerous one night stands have made her an iconic character.

Ricardo Antonio Chavira played Gabrielle's husband, Carlos Solis, who has to cope with the revelation of his wife's affair with their gardener, while trying to get out of jail. Mark Moses continues his role of widower Paul Young, who tries to cover up the murder of his adoptive son's biological mother. Zach Young, portrayed by Cody Kasch, finally learns about his true identity, but refuses to be a part of his father's life, whereas Julie Mayer, Susan's daughter portrayed by Andrea Bowen, deals with her parents' unexpected reconciliation. James Denton portrayed Mike Delfino, who has to deal with both his break-up with Susan Mayer, and his recently discovered biological son. Previously a recurring character throughout the last episodes of the previous season, Betty Applewhite, portrayed by Alfre Woodard, was conceived as a new resident of Wisteria Lane, whose mysterious arc is the season's main storyline. Also promoted from guest stars to series regulars were Doug Savant and Richard Burgi, who portrayed Tom Scavo and Karl Mayer, respectively.

Receiving "also starring" billing were Shawn Pyfrom, portraying Bree's homosexual son Andrew Van de Kamp, Joy Lauren in the role of Danielle Van de Kamp, Bree's irresponsible and rebel daughter, Mehcad Brooks, portraying Matthew Applewhite, Betty's son who begins a relationship with Danielle, and Brent Kinsman, Shane Kinsman and Zane Huett, playing Preston Scavo, Porter Scavo and Parker Scavo, Lynette's troublesome children. Also receiving an "also starring" billing was Roger Bart, who portrayed George Williams for nine episodes until his character's suicide. Page Kennedy originated the role of Caleb Applewhite, Betty's troubled son, until his replacement with NaShawn Kearse.

Numerous characters have been given expansive arcs in the progressive story line of the season. Kathryn Joosten portrayed Karen McCluskey, one of the most prominent residents of Wisteria Lane who mainly develops in Lynette's story line, whereas Pat Crawford Brown appeared as elderly neighbor Ida Greenberg. Part of Susan's storyline were Lesley Ann Warren returning as Sophie Bremmer, Susan's dramatic mother, Jay Harrington portraying Ron McCready, a doctor and Susan's boyfriend in the second half of the season, Paul Dooley appearing as Addison Prudy, Susan's real father, and Joyce Van Patten playing Carol Prudy, Addison's wife. Part of Lynette's storyline were Currie Graham and Joely Fisher in the roles of Ed Ferrara and Nina Fletcher, who are introduced as Lynette's superiors at the advertising firm she has started working for, and Kiersten Warren appearing as Nora Huntington in the season finale, before her character began being developed for a season three arc. Part of Bree's storyline were Shirley Knight playing Phyllis Van de Kamp, Rex's mother, Dakin Matthews in the role of Reverend Sykes, reverend at the local Presbyterian church, Sam Lloyd portraying Albert Goldfine, Bree's therapist, Ryan Carnes appearing as Justin, Andrew's lover, Bruce Jarchow playing Sam Bormanis, Andrew's lawyer whom he gets to emancipate him, Lee Tergesen in the role of Peter McMillan, Bree's AA sponsor, and former series regular Steven Culp returning in the season finale as Rex Van de Kamp, Bree's now deceased husband.

Part of Gabrielle's storyline were Jesse Metcalfe appearing in a guest star capacity as John Rowland, Gabrielle's former gardener with whom she had an affair, Adrian Pasdar portraying David Bradley, a sleazy lawyer that Gabrielle hires to get Carlos out of jail, Jeff Doucette in the role of Father Crowley, priest at the local Catholic church, Melinda Page Hamilton portraying Sister Mary Bernard, a nun trying to pursue Carlos, Nichole Hiltz and Eddie McClintock respectively playing Libby Collins and Frank Helm, parents of Gabrielle's temporary foster baby, John Kapelos acting as Eugene Beale, owner of an adoption agency, and Gwendoline Yeo appearing as Xiao-Mei, a Chinese woman that is impregnated with Gabrielle's child and begins an affair with Carlos. Part of Mary Alice's storyline were Harriet Sansom Harris returning as Felicia Tilman, who is planning to avenge the death of her sister Martha Huber, and Bob Gunton portraying Noah Taylor, Zach's biological grandfather. Orson Hodge, portrayed by future series regular Kyle MacLachlan, is introduced close to the end of the season, but is initially conceived as a love interest for Susan, before being rewritten as part of Bree's story line.

== Reception ==
=== Critical response ===
Many critics agreed that the series suffered a sophomore slump and that the second season failed to live up to the first. Henry Goldblatt of Entertainment Weekly gave the new season a "B", blaming the deteriorating quality on the fact that it "morphed into four series," with "the actresses wandering through their separate scenes." Robert Bianco of USA Today suggested that the series' weakness was due to Marc Cherry leaving the episodic screenwriting to other writing staff members. Variety's Brian Lowry gave the season premiere a positive review, opining that the Lynette storyline looked "extremely promising" and enjoyed the addition of Joely Fisher to the cast as Lynette's "tight-assed new boss." He identified the Bree storyline as "the real water-cooler sequence" and complimented Marcia Cross' performance. However, Lowry criticized the Gabrielle and Susan storylines, opining that they are "exhibiting signs of wear and tear." Michael Slezak of Entertainment Weekly noted that "Next" had "a particularly sleepy opening twenty minutes" while its exciting plot points all occurred in the second half of the episode. He praised the scene in which Bree changes the tie on Rex's corpse and called Cross' performance throughout the episode "pitch-perfect." Slezak also complimented Huffman's performance, but wondered if Fisher was "a steely enough an actress to go Manolo-a-Manolo with Huffman every week."

Though he criticized the repetitive nature of the Susan and Gabrielle storylines, Slezak thought that the Applewhite mystery would help reduce the show's chances of falling into a sophomore slump. He praised Woodward's acting as well as her character's storyline, opining, "there's something so inherently warm and maternal in Woodard's performance, such apple-pie wholesomeness, that it makes her touches of menace all the more chilling." Gael Fashingbauer Cooper of MSNBC complimented that Applewhite storyline, writing: "Forget Lynette's career stress, Gabrielle's baby daddy drama, and even Bree's new widowhood: This story has legs, and apparently arms." She found it strange that the Bree, Andrew, and Danielle characters showed little emotion in regards to Rex's death. Additionally, she noted that the Lynette and Gabrielle storylines provided comic relief while Susan, a character "so often saddled with the comic relief of the show, had a sad and serious premiere." Sarah Gilbert of TV Squad gave the episode a positive review, stating the episode delivered "lots of juicy resolution, several power suits, and, you guessed it, lots of tears and shouting." Aaron Wallace of Ultimate Disney notes Susan's decreasing importance throughout the season, pointing out Bree, who "comfortably moves into position as the show's lead". Also in response to Susan's storyline, many critics saw the character suffer as a result of the declining quality of the second season. Robert Bianco of USA Today wrote that the writers were making her look "too stupid".

=== Awards and nominations ===
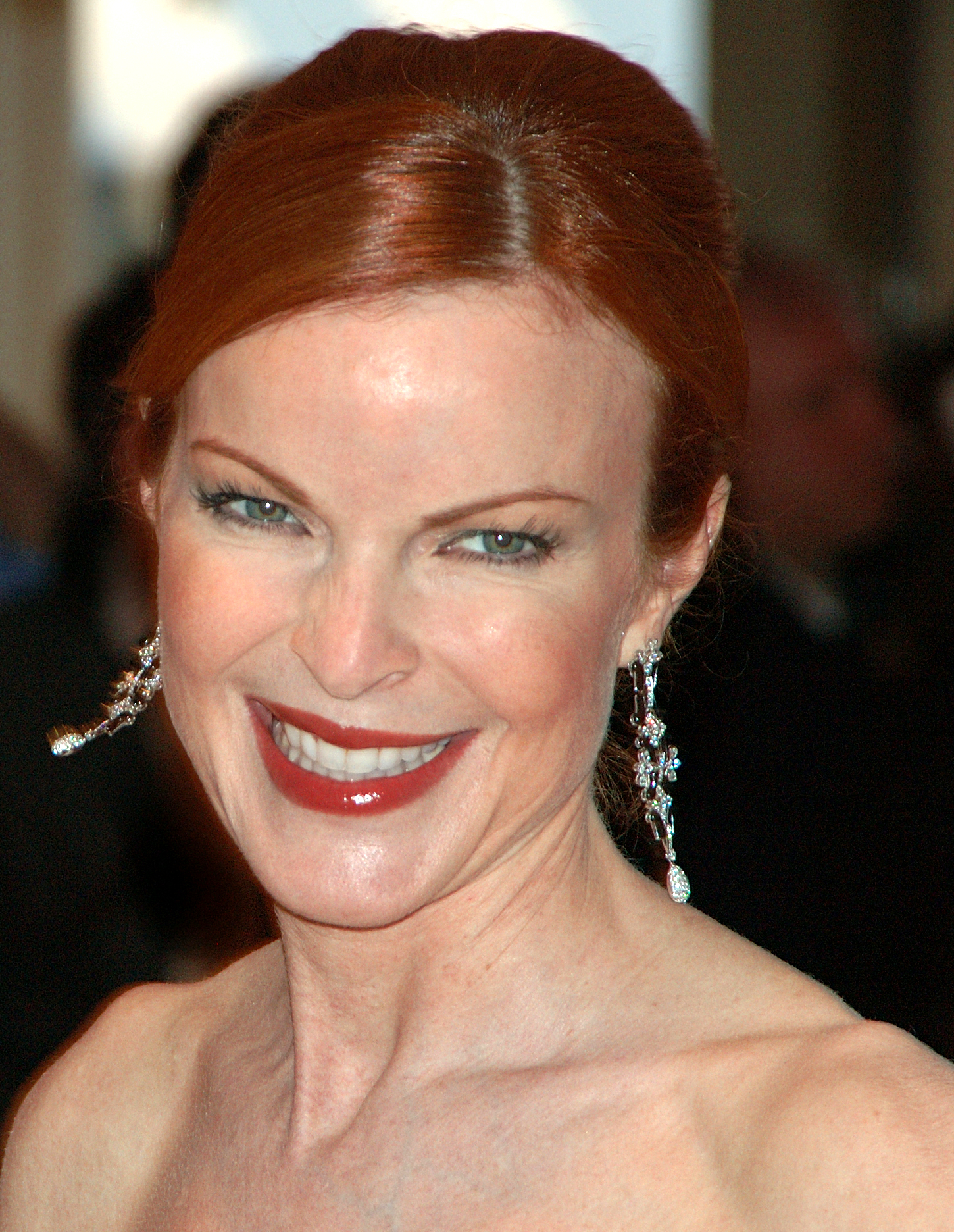
The prominence of Cross' character throughout the season was noted by many critics, who considered her to have developed into the main character of the series.

The season, cast and crew received critical acclaim and numerous awards and nominations. The 58th Primetime Emmy Awards saw the series receive seven nominations, out of which five were for the production team. The series was nominated for both Outstanding Single-Camera Picture Editing for a Comedy Series and for Outstanding Hairstyling for a Series, as well as for Outstanding Costumes for a Series, Outstanding Casting for a Comedy Series and Outstanding Art Direction for a Single-Camera Series. Alfre Woodard's portrayal of Betty Applewhite was praised and resulted in a nomination for Outstanding Supporting Actress in a Comedy Series, whereas Shirley Knight's guest appearance in the role of Phyllis Van de Kamp got her a nomination in the Outstanding Guest Actress in a Comedy Series category. At the 63rd Golden Globe Awards, the series was named the Best Musical or Comedy Series, while each of the four main actresses received a nomination for their portrayals of the protagonists, but all lost to Weeds's Mary-Louise Parker.

At the 64th Golden Globe Awards, however, the series only received a nomination for Best Musical or Comedy Series, seeing Cross and Huffman nominated for their respective roles. The fifth episode of the season received a nomination at the 2006 Art Directors Guild for the Best Single-Camera Television Series category, while the Casting Society of America nominated Junie Lowry-Johnson and Scott Genkinger for Best Comedy Episodic Casting, following their being awarded at the previous year's ceremony. The Costume Designer's Guild Awards praised the costumes used on-set, and nominated the series for Excellence for Costume Design for Television. The 18th Gay and Lesbian Alliance Against Defamation Media Awards nominated the series for Outstanding Comedy Series, while Mehcad Brooks individual performance of Matthew Applewhite was nominated at the 2005 National Association for the Advancement of Colored People Image Awards. The 2006 ceremony of the Monte Carlo Television Festival saw the series being awarded for the first time as the Best Comedy Series, before winning the same award for another five years in a row. The series was nominated for Most Popular Drama at the 2006 National Television Awards, following the nomination for the series in the Favorite Television Comedy at the 2006 People's Choice Awards, which also saw Teri Hatcher getting a nomination for her performance in the role of Susan Mayer. Felicity Huffman's portrayal of Lynette Scavo earned her an award for Outstanding Actress in a Comedy Series at the 2005 Screen Actors Guild Awards, whereas at the 2006 ceremony, the series received a nomination for Outstanding Cast in a Comedy Series and a nomination in the Outstanding Actress in a Comedy Series category for Huffman.

At the 2006 Teen Choice Awards, both Eva Longoria and Teri Hatcher were nominated for Choice Television Comedy Actress, whereas Jesse Metcalfe's guest appearances in the role of John Rowland earned him a nomination for Choice Television Comedy Actor, which was eventually won by James Denton, for his portrayal of Mike Delfino. The writing of "Next", the season premiere, resulted in the production team receiving a nomination for Best Writing in an Episodic Comedy at the 2005 Writers Guild of America Awards, while the 2006 ceremony saw the writing staff nominated in the same category for "Don't Look at Me". The series received three nominations at the 2005 ceremony of Young Artist Awards, where Andrea Bowen was nominated for Best Leading Young Actress in a Comedy or Drama Television Series, and Cody Kasch for Best Supporting Young Actor in a Comedy or Drama Television Series. Zane Huett, however, was the only cast member awarded at the ceremony, in the Best Young Actor Age Ten or Younger in a Comedy or Drama Television Series category.

=== Ratings ===
The American Broadcasting Company kept Desperate Housewives's original time slot, airing the series on Sunday nights at 9:00 ET. The series continued to air as a lead-in to fellow ABC series Grey's Anatomy, then in its second season, which took over Boston Legal's time slot after airing nine episodes in the 2004-05 prime time television season. The show minatained its position as a top ten series and became the fourth most-watched program for 2005-06 American television season, with an average of 21.70 million viewers, out of whom 10.09 million in the 18-49 age group. ABC had three top 20 shows on the Sunday Night lineup, seeing Desperate Housewives ranked fourth, along with the other two shows, ranking fifth and nineteenth. The ninth and tenth episodes ranked first in weekly viewership.

The highest-rated episode of the season was the season premiere, with 28.36 million viewers tuning in and 10.1 rating, ranking second in the week after the sixth-season premiere of CBS's CSI: Crime Scene Investigation, which was watched by 29.02 million viewers and received a 10.3 rating. The episode, which is the second highest-rated episode of the series, attracted a larger audience compared to the previous season premiere, which received a 7.8 rating and was watched by 21.64 million viewers, almost seven less million viewers than "Next". Although the episode attracted less viewers than CSI, it outperformed both Lost and Grey's Anatomy, one of the most successful series of the season. The lowest-rated episode was the nineteenth, watched by 20.02 million viewers with a 7.1 rating and #5 ranking, being the first to be outperformed by Fox Broadcasting Company's House, which attracted 21.20 million viewers and received a 7.6 rating. The season finale was watched by 24.23 million viewers, scoring an 8.6 rating and #4 ranking. There was a significant decrease in the number of viewers, compared to "One Wonderful Day", the previous season finale, which was the highest-rated episode of the series, attracting almost six more million viewers with an 11.0 rating.

== Episodes ==
No. overall	No. in season	Title	Directed by	Written by	Original release date	U.S. viewers (millions)
24	1	"Next"	Larry Shaw	Jenna Bans & Kevin Murphy	September 25, 2005	28.36
Susan wrestles the gun away from Zach, who runs away after unsuccessfully attempting to kill Mike. Mike refuses to press charges and confesses that Zach is his biological son, forcing Susan to end their relationship, as she cannot be around Zach. In the wake of Rex's death, Bree must suffer through the company of her disrespectful mother-in-law, Phyllis, who claims that Bree made Rex miserable during his last years. While in jail, Carlos refuses to forgive Gabrielle for her infidelity, despite her insisting that he is the father of her baby. Lynette secures a job at an advertising agency and immediately learns how difficult it will be to balance work and motherhood. Betty Applewhite and her son, Matthew, do their best to keep up appearances in Wisteria Lane while they are secretly keeping a prisoner in their basement.
25	2	"You Could Drive a Person Crazy"	David Grossman	Chris Black & Alexandra Cunningham	October 2, 2005	27.11
Susan is dismayed to see that her ex-husband, Karl, has moved in with Edie. Meanwhile, she and Mike continue their relationship on a casual basis. The doctor treating Rex finds the note he wrote before he died and hands it to the lead insurance investigator. When Phyllis sees Bree seeking comfort in George, she implies to the insurance company that Bree had a motive to kill Rex. Fed up with having to bring bills to Carlos in jail, Gabrielle demands control over their finances. Lynette releases a rat in her house to urge Tom to clean while she is at work, after she watched an horror movie about the rats. Susan confronts Betty about the strange clanging noises coming from her house. Betty later acquires sleeping pills from her psychiatrist and puts them into the food of her secret prisoner to keep him quiet.
26	3	"You'll Never Get Away from Me"	Arlene Sanford	Tom Spezialy & Ellie Herman	October 9, 2005	26.06
After discovering the insurance investigators' suspicion that Rex was poisoned, Bree sends Phyllis away and takes a polygraph test to clear herself of suspicion of killing Rex. She urges George, who the police suspect is her accomplice, to take one as well; both pass. Susan is jealous when she learns that Edie and Julie are entering the church family talent show. Betty deals with her secret prisoner's near-escape while Matthew tells her to be nicer to the neighbors. Mike visits Felicia in an attempt to discover Zach's whereabouts. Lynette is unable to get the morning off from work to accompany Parker on his first day of school, so she joins him via live video chat. On a nostalgic impulse, Gabrielle follows John to his new job but instead sees him with another woman. She then apologizes to Carlos for having an affair, wholeheartedly, for the first time.
27	4	"My Heart Belongs to Daddy"	Robert Duncan McNeill	John Pardee & Joey Murphy	October 16, 2005	25.78
Gabrielle hires a successful lawyer, the handsome David Bradley, to help Carlos get out of jail. Andrew acts out when Bree tries to incorporate George into their lives, prompting her to send him back to a youth detention camp. Lynette sees the toll her long hours have taken when Parker creates an imaginary friend, Mrs. Mulberry, who is somewhat of a surrogate mother. When Parker's behavior and protection of Mrs. Mulberry becomes more demanding, Lynette intervenes by throwing Mrs. Mulberry's umbrella in the trash. Susan reconnects with Mike and agrees to help search for Zach. At a local park, Susan finds Zach and offers to buy him lunch. When Zach begins to ask questions about Julie, Susan gives him money to find Paul in Utah, and does not inform Mike of their encounter.
28	5	"They Asked Me Why I Believe in You"	David Grossman	Alan Cross	October 23, 2005	25.22
Susan learns that her agent and longtime friend, Lonny, has been embezzling her money. Susan chooses to remain loyal to Lonny, but upon discussing the matter with Mike, discovers that he is less willing to forgive and trust people. Hoping to make working with her boss, Nina, easier, Lynette takes her out drinking. However, Nina soon begs Lynette to go to the bar every night, causing Lynette to miss valuable time with her family. Carlos only agrees to hire Bradley as his lawyer after Bradley threatens to pursue Gabrielle if he opts otherwise. Bree is horrified to learn that Rex died believing she had poisoned him, and she throws her wedding ring in Rex's grave. Chicago police arrest a man in the Melanie Foster murder case, prompting Betty to write an anonymous letter explaining that they have arrested the wrong man. This angers Matthew, who thinks that she is turning in her other son Caleb–the prisoner in their basement.
29	6	"I Wish I Could Forget You"	Larry Shaw	Kevin Etten & Josh Senter	November 6, 2005	23.93
After discovering that Paul Young has returned to Wisteria Lane, Susan calls the police to report him for Martha Huber's murder. However, the police dismiss Susan's claim when Mike denies hearing a confession from Paul. Bree and George attempt to consummate their relationship, but Bree continually breaks into hives; Dr. Goldfine suggests that her sudden breakouts occur because she still feels she is married. Lynette buys a new suit after finding out that she is the butt of jokes around the office. After being shot at the courthouse, David believes that he is in love with Gabrielle, but she discredits this claim. Paul questions Susan about Zach's whereabouts, and Susan tells him that she sent him to Utah. Paul later mentions this to Mike, who angrily breaks up with Susan over the betrayal.
30	7	"Color and Light"	David Grossman	Marc Cherry	November 13, 2005	25.93
Lynette arranges a weekly play date between her and another couples' children so she and Tom can have some downtime. They soon discover, however, that the other children's parents have a secret hobby of making sex tapes. George purchases a house in the neighborhood and proposes to Bree, who hesitantly accepts the marriage proposal; George later attacks Dr. Goldfine when he convinces Bree to reconsider the proposal. Susan and Karl drunkenly sleep together after he and Edie break up. When Susan expresses reservations about restarting their relationship, Karl decides to return to Edie. Betty and Matthew discover that Caleb has escaped. After entertaining her model friends from New York, Gabrielle finds Caleb in her house. She tries to run away, but falls down a flight of stairs.
31	8	"The Sun Won't Set"	Stephen Cragg	Jenna Bans	November 20, 2005	25.92
Gabrielle suffers a miscarriage after her fall and represses her grief; Carlos hires an ex-con to help Gabrielle deal with the loss. Susan's mother admits that Susan's biological father is a local businessman, not a deceased war veteran. Lynette worries that her children will not react safely when approached by a stranger. Bree receives a visit from George's ex-fiancé Leila, who warns that George is dangerous and extremely possessive. Bree later publicly breaks off her engagement with George when he angrily demands that she put on her wedding ring. Matthew continues searching for Caleb but is sidetracked by a blossoming relationship with Danielle. Caleb is found by Mike and arrested. Gabrielle identifies him as the intruder and Betty silently warns him to stay quiet.
32	9	"That's Good, That's Bad"	Larry Shaw	Kevin Murphy	November 27, 2005	25.89
Susan introduces herself to her father, Addison Prudy, at the hardware store he works at, but he is reluctant to build a relationship with her. Carlos receives early parole with the help of Sister Mary Bernard, who poses a threat for Gabrielle's marriage, advising Gabrielle and Carlos to seek an annulment. Lynette is promoted after Nina is fired; Nina warns Lynette to "say goodbye to the kids" due to the long hours. Bree suspects that George attacked Dr. Goldfine and calls the police. After the police search George's house, Bree is informed that there is evidence that George was most likely responsible for Rex's death. Hoping to win Bree back, George checks into a hotel where she is co-charing a charity event and attempts suicide by overdosing on pills. Bree later confronts George at his hotel room for poisoning Rex and quietly waits until he dies.
33	10	"Coming Home"	Arlene Sanford	Chris Black	December 4, 2005	25.52
Addison's wife sees him and Susan together and thinks he is having an affair, forcing Susan to tell her that she is his daughter. Lynette fights for office daycare so she can see her children more often. Gabrielle thwarts Carlos' attempts to do charity work with Sister Mary by neglecting to inform the nurses about his allergy to eggs, causing him to have an allergic reaction to the yellow fever vaccine. Zach returns home and reunites with Paul, who does not inform him that Mike is his biological father. Betty discovers that the police are keeping Caleb in a mental hospital. Betty and Matthew successfully sneak Caleb out of the facility, but not without the attention of a private investigator. Andrew returns home from camp, and Bree confesses to him that she watched as George committed suicide; Andrew plots to use this revelation against her as part of his plan for revenge.
34	11	"One More Kiss"	Wendey Stanzler	Joey Murphy & John Pardee	January 8, 2006	23.72
Lynette is upset when Gabrielle kisses Tom at a neighborhood party, but Gabrielle insists that it was only a joke. After Bree voices her disapproval of Andrew's homosexual relationship, Andrew threatens to tell the police about Bree's role in George's suicide. Betty and Matthew find that a private investigator hired by the Fosters has broken into their home, fell through their stairs, and accidentally shot himself. They plan to dispose of his body and car, but accidentally lock the keys inside the car with his body in the trunk. Susan and Julie help Mike connect with Zach without Paul's knowledge. When Paul finds out, he confronts Mike and they have an altercation. Susan drives by and, distracted, accidentally crashes into the private detective's car, causing the trunk door to pop open. After the neighborhood discovers the detective's body, Edie expresses her suspicions of the Applewhites to the other ladies.
35	12	"We're Gonna Be All Right"	David Grossman	Alexandra Cunningham	January 15, 2006	22.52
Susan fakes medical symptoms so she can see Dr. Ron McCready and ask him on a date. When she comes clean, he is angry because he could not figure out what her ailment was; however, he did find that she has a wandering spleen. Lynette learns that Tom has thought about having a second wife and family if she were to die. Gabrielle finds out that an ex-boyfriend has posted nude pictures of her on the internet, and asks Carlos to manipulate him into giving the photos back. Mike visits an ailing Noah Taylor, and Felicia is revealed to be Noah's new nurse. Bree is arrested for a DUI and must walk home from jail. Betty sees her and offers her a ride home. Bree denies being drunk, but Betty does not seem to believe her. This causes Bree to furiously mention the several controversies surrounding Betty's family, which prompts Betty to put the house up for sale.
36	13	"There's Something About a War"	Larry Shaw	Kevin Etten	January 22, 2006	25.33
After discovering that Sister Mary has returned to the United States, Gabrielle tells Father Crowley that Sister Mary and Carlos have had sex, leading to Sister Mary being transferred to Alaska. Gabrielle later informs Carlos that she wants to start trying for a baby again. Susan is nervous about being Dr. Ron's first splenectomy patient because of their new relationship. Tom is given a job at Lynette's firm despite her reluctance. Bree finds out about Matthew and Danielle's relationship and discusses the matter with Betty. In the process, Bree sees Caleb in the window of Betty's house and recognizes him as Gabrielle's intruder. To help protect the Applewhites, Danielle tells Matthew about Bree covering up Andrew's hit-and-run. Betty confronts Bree, threatening to report her to the police if she tells anyone about Caleb.
37	14	"Silly People"	Robert Duncan McNeill	Tom Spezialy	February 12, 2006	23.47
Carlos and Gabrielle take in Xiao-Mei, a former slave who is faced with deportation, as their new maid. Susan finds out that she does not have health insurance, and Edie suggests marrying somebody quickly to get a health plan. Karl ultimately agrees to remarry Susan so she can use his benefits, but they both agree to keep Dr. Ron and Edie in the dark. Lynette is dismayed when she sees Ed taking advantage of Tom during a series of office hi-jinks. Bree sneaks into Betty's home to talk to Caleb. Later, Betty tells Bree that Caleb murdered Melanie Foster, Matthew's on-and-off girlfriend in Chicago, after she reacted violently to Caleb's advances; Betty blames herself for the incident and tearfully explains that she could not let Caleb go to prison. Felicia gives Noah a note revealing that he has a grandchild, after which Noah demands that Mike bring Zach to see him.
38	15	"Thank You So Much"	David Grossman	Dahvi Waller	February 19, 2006	23.41
Bree babysits Lynette's children and passes out drunk, leading Lynette to conclude that she has a drinking problem. Gabrielle's mother, Lucia, shows up unexpectedly and offers to be their surrogate mother, as Gabrielle can no longer conceive children. Gabrielle, still angry at her mother for not protecting her against her sexually aggressive stepfather, kicks her mother out, and Carlos suggests that they adopt instead. Mike tells Paul and Zach to leave town before Noah can track them down. As Susan and Karl plan for their secret wedding, Edie discovers a prenup and Susan's ring in Karl's briefcase and assumes that Karl is going to propose to her. That night, Edie is left hurt and disappointed when Karl does not propose like she thought he would. Karl assures Susan that he still plans to marry Edie, and the two get married for the second time at the courthouse.
39	16	"There Is No Other Way"	Randy Zisk	Bruce Zimmerman	March 12, 2006	22.20
Felicia returns to Wisteria Lane, while Paul is arrested and almost killed by Noah's hired thugs. After Paul is released, Zach agrees to meet with Noah, during which he instructs Noah not to hurt Paul again. Gabrielle and Carlos' visit to an adoption clinic goes awry when Helen Rowland informs the adoption clerk about Gabrielle's illegal affair with John, after which Gabrielle and Carlos seek an adoption lawyer. Tom struggles for power in his marriage both at home and at the workplace. Dr. Ron finds out about Susan's marriage to Karl immediately after she professes her love for Mike while under anesthesia. Andrew, seeking emancipation and an early trust fund, accuses Bree of hitting him while she was drunk. Unwilling to let Andrew win, Bree joins an alcoholics anonymous program, but takes out a bottle of wine after the first meeting.
40	17	"Could I Leave You?"	Pam Thomas	Scott Sanford Tobis	March 26, 2006	21.41
Dr. Ron breaks up with Susan after he finds out that she lied about being in love with Mike. Gabrielle and Carlos find an attractive mother to adopt from; however, the woman, Libby, has not yet told the father that she is giving the baby up. Lynette takes issue with a woman in her office who is still breast-feeding her five-year-old son. Matthew wants to buy Danielle a present for her birthday but cannot because he does not have a job. Caleb expresses an interest in Danielle and hides in her bedroom to offer her a gift. Danielle instead shoos Caleb out and calls him a freak, causing Caleb to run out of the house. After Andrew tells Bree that he will tell the judge she sexually abused him, she gets drunk and passes out in a department store. Her AA sponsor, Peter McMillan, comes to her aid and helps her realize that she does have a drinking problem.
41	18	"Everybody Says Don't"	Tom Cherones	Teleplay by : Jenna Bans & Alexandra Cunningham; Story by : Jim Lincoln	April 2, 2006	21.82
Bree takes an interest in Peter, who is also a recovering sex addict. Lynette is compelled to give a deposition in Andrew's emancipation and informs Bree that she intends to be honest with the lawyer, much to Bree's dismay. After discovering that Andrew lied about being abused by his mother, Lynette protects Bree and testifies in her favor. Dr. Ron tells Edie about Susan and Karl's sham marriage, after which Karl agrees to throw Edie a lavish wedding. At Edie and Karl's engagement party, Felicia publicly accuses Paul of killing her sister, while Karl reveals his feelings for Susan and kisses her. Gabrielle and Carlos meet Libby's boyfriend Frank, and discovers that he believes that Libby will be raising the baby. Libby gives birth and confesses to Frank that the father is actually his brother; Gabrielle and Carlos then flee the hospital with the baby girl to ensure that they keep her.
42	19	"Don't Look at Me"	David Grossman	Josh Senter	April 16, 2006	20.02
Bree's parents show up on her court date with Andrew and have it postponed. They offer to take Andrew back to Rhode Island, sensing a disconnect between Andrew and Bree, but back out upon finding out that Andrew is gay. Gabrielle adjusts to motherhood after she and Carlos are granted temporary custody of Lily, the newborn baby, after the baby's birth father was unable to attend the court proceedings. Parker begins to ask about sex. Felicia continues to antagonize Paul by replacing his lighter fluid with gasoline and calling an exterminator to tent up his house. Susan sleeps with Karl again when he claims that he and Edie have broken up. After discovering that Karl lied, Susan is furious that he made her the other woman and throws him out.
43	20	"It Wasn't Meant to Happen"	Larry Shaw	Marc Cherry & Tom Spezialy	April 30, 2006	21.30
Lynette tries to help her boss Ed with his marital woes by sending dirty instant messages to his wife. When his wife finds out, she demands that he fire whoever is responsible. He blames Tom, as Lynette is too valuable to lose. Karl leaves Edie, claiming there is another woman; Edie hires a private detective to find out who Karl's other woman is. Bree offers to be Peter's sex addiction sponsor, hoping to build a relationship. Betty sells the house without Matthew's knowledge. To convince his mother to reconsider, Matthew and Danielle stage Danielle's near-rape at the hands of Caleb. Bree demands that Betty do something about Caleb, and Betty is later seen with a bottle of phenobarbital. Gabrielle and Carlos obtain full custody of Lily, but Libby changes her mind and takes her back; Gabrielle tearfully pleads for Libby to reconsider, as she and Carlos have already fallen in love with Lily.
44	21	"I Know Things Now"	Wendey Stanzler	Kevin Etten & Bruce Zimmerman	May 7, 2006	21.33
While dealing with having baby Lily taken away, Gabrielle and Carlos ask Xiao-Mei to be their surrogate so she can avoid deportation. Ed hires a forensic accountant, who uncovers evidence in Tom's expenses that he may be having an affair in Atlantic City. Betty discovers that Matthew set Caleb up before she poisons him, and she locks Matthew in Caleb's old cell as punishment for making her almost murder her son. Susan is blackmailed by Edie's private investigator; unable to come up with the money, Susan instead decides to send Edie a letter of apology detailing her fling with Karl. Upon receiving the letter, Edie drenches Susan's house in kerosene and sets it on fire. Still thirsty for revenge, Andrew seduces Peter and purposely lures Bree to the scene. The next morning, Bree leaves Andrew on the side of the road, telling him she cannot be around him anymore.
45	22	"No One Is Alone"	David Grossman	Kevin Murphy & Chris Black	May 14, 2006	21.03
Susan tries to elicit Edie's confession for burning down her house on tape. Edie catches on and chases Susan, but falls and is attacked by a swarm of yellowjackets. Lynette follows Tom to Atlantic City and sees him with another woman. When Tom returns to Fairview, he finds that Lynette has taken the kids and left. Gabrielle worries that Carlos is prioritizing Xiao-Mei's needs over hers, only a few days into the pregnancy. Reeling from recent events, Bree breaks down and causes a scene at Danielle's birthday party. Embarrassed, Danielle arrives at the Applewhite house and discovers Matthew locked in the basement; Danielle later strikes Betty with a crowbar and steals the key. After discovering that Danielle and Matthew have run away, Bree admits herself to a mental health facility for psychiatric observation. In a final act of revenge, Felicia frames Paul for her murder by severing her own fingers before leaving town.
46 47	23 24	"Remember"	Larry Shaw	Teleplay by : Marc Cherry & Jenna Bans; Story by : Alexandra Cunningham & Tom Spezialy	May 21, 2006	24.23
Flashbacks depict how Mary Alice met Susan, Bree, Lynette and Gabrielle as they moved to Wisteria Lane. In the present, Betty and Caleb prepare to leave Wisteria Lane but are detained by the police. At the police station, Betty is shown a picture of Melanie's dead body; Betty recognizes the jacket in the picture as Matthew's, and a flashback reveals that Matthew was the one who killed Melanie after she threatened to have Caleb put away. Karl sees Mike at a local jewellers and discovers that Mike wants to marry Susan. After speaking with Paul in prison, Zach visits Noah and kills him by shutting off his ventilator. Lynette learns that the woman she saw Tom with is Nora Huntington, his one-night stand from eleven years ago; she had a child and only recently contacted Tom about her. While in the mental health facility, Bree meets a visitor named Orson. Gabrielle places baby monitors around the house and catches Xiao-Mei and Carlos in the act; she kicks Carlos out and tells Xiao-Mei she cannot leave as long as she is still pregnant. Zach abandons Paul and instead decides to live a life of luxury, as he is the sole heir of Noah's fortune. Lynette and Nora meet and clash immediately; Nora also announces she is moving to Fairview. Betty calls Bree to tell her about her new discovery, and Bree escapes. Bree confronts Danielle and Matthew at her home; Matthew pulls out a gun but is shot and killed by the police, who were called by Betty. Susan rejects Karl's gift, a house, and rekindles her romance with Mike. They plan dinner, but Mike is deliberately hit by Orson in his car and left for dead. The next morning, Betty and Caleb move away to start fresh, while Orson visits Bree.

== DVD release ==
The Complete Second Season of Desperate Housewives was released as a 6-disc DVD set in region 1 on August 29, 2006. This release included all 24 episodes from season 2, deleted scenes, audio commentaries by Marc Cherry, behind-the-scenes featurettes, exclusive unaired story lines from the season, an interview with Marc Cherry and his mom and more. For Walmart Stores and for limited time only, some sets had a bonus disc attached that included some extra features not previously included on the regular dvd bonus features.

Desperate Housewives: The Complete Second Season (The Extra Juicy Edition)
Set details	Special features	
24 Episodes; 6-Disc Set; English (Dolby Digital 5.1 Surround); English SDH subtitles; Runtime: 1032 minutes; Audio Commentaries	Marc & Mom - Interview with series' creator Marc Cherry and his mother, The Muse.; Directing Desperate Housewives - An episode from concept to completion.; Desperate Role Models - Iconic TV Housewives share their wit and wisdom with the women of Wisteria Lane.; Cherry-Picked - Creator Marc Cherry's Favourite Scenes; Unaired Susan Mayer & Lynette Scavo Story Lines from episodes "Color and Light" and "No One is Alone"; Optional Audio Commentary by creator Marc Cherry on the Unaired Story Lines; Deleted Scenes; Optional audio commentaries on the deleted scenes by Marc Cherry.; Fashion & Couture - Costume designer Cate Adair shows how the desperate housewives' looks are created.; Juicy Bites - Housewives of Wisteria Lane reveal their juiciest moments.; "The Whole Story" Promo; Desperate Housewives Poker - Mini-activity game demo from 'Desperate Housewives - The Game'.; Walmart bonus disc features: Exclusive Bonus Recap episode: "The More You Know, The Juicier It Gets"; Bonus Deleted Scenes; Behind-the-Scenes with actor James Denton	
DVD release dates
Region 1	Region 2	Region 4
August 29, 2006	November 13, 2006	September 27, 2006
