= Orson Hodge =

Fictional character on Desperate Housewives

- Portrayed by: Kyle MacLachlan
- Duration: 2006–2012
- First appearance: "Don't Look at Me"; 2x19, April 16, 2006
- Last appearance: "She Needs Me"; 8x15, March 4, 2012
- Created by: Marc Cherry
In-universe information
- Occupation: Part Owner of Mrs. Van de Kamp's Catering Business; Caterer; Dentist
- Father: Edwin Hodge (deceased)
- Mother: Gloria Hodge
- Wife: Alma Hodge (m. 1993; div. 2005) Bree Van de Kamp (m. 2006; div. 2015)
- Children: Unborn Child (via Alma)
- Aunts: At least 1 (deceased)

Orson Hodge is a fictional character on the ABC television series Desperate Housewives. The character is played by Kyle MacLachlan. Orson is introduced in the final episodes of the second season of the series, and becomes the main mystery of the third season. MacLachlan left the main cast in season 6, but made guest appearances until the eighth and final season.

== Development and casting ==
The character of Orson Hodge was planned as a romantic interest for Susan Mayer (Teri Hatcher), according to executive producer Tom Spezialy, until Cherry decided to pair Orson with Bree Van de Kamp (Marcia Cross). For the third season's mystery, series creator Marc Cherry wanted to incorporate more of the series' regular characters rather than bringing in various new ones, as they had done in the second season with Betty Applewhite (Alfre Woodard) and her family. They developed the Orson plot line around the "idea that one of our women marries a guy who has dark secrets and possibly a violent streak." Cherry opined: "I thought there was something exciting about that, but real and relatable." Greenstein commented that the writers worked backwards from the second season's cliffhangers to develop the Orson storyline, forsaking the original material that had been developed earlier. The cast responded positively to the new material for the season.

When Orson was introduced toward the end of the second season, he was to be a con artist. A character portrayed by Julie White appeared in the second-season finale and would have been Orson's accomplice, but the entire storyline was discarded in favor of the mysterious disappearance of Orson's wife and White's character was not seen or mentioned again. MacLachlan commented that his character is "desperate to make this relationship with Bree work. Anything that tries to knock that apart becomes a threat." Cherry called Orson Bree's perfect match, but added that their similarities "will ultimately prove to be the downfall of the relationship."

== Storylines ==
=== Backstory ===
Orson Hodge was born on June 28, 1964. He grew up in a very religious household. When he was sixteen, his father Edwin had an affair. When the truth came out, it caused a scandal at their church and he became an alcoholic. He thought as a child that his father committed suicide, but he realizes as an adult that his mother Gloria killed him. Gloria convinced Orson to spend time at a mental hospital in Connecticut for clinical depression, as she blamed him for his father's death. He later became a dentist.

Orson married his girlfriend, Alma, when she got pregnant. Alma miscarried, and Orson had an affair with French flight attendant Monique Polier instead. Gloria murdered Monique.

== Reception ==
The mystery storyline of Orson in the third season received mixed reviews. Dave Anderson of TV Guide called the season premiere first-rate, while praising the comedic Bree storyline and declaring the set-up for the Orson mystery storyline ingenious. Andy Dehnart of MSNBC cited Orson's storyline as a welcomed change from the slow-moving Applewhite mystery arc. On negative reviews, TV Guide writer Matt Roush unfavorably compared the Orson character to Bree's former love interest, George Williams (Roger Bart), while Lindsay Soll of Entertainment Weekly simply labelled Orson's storyline as "confusing".
