= Betty Murphy =

American television and film actress

Betty Murphy is an American television and film actress.

Murphy has appeared in five films which include Attack on Terror: The FBI vs. the Ku Klux Klan, 1918, Urban Cowboy, Alone and Life.

Murphy's television work includes guest spots on America's Most Wanted, Everybody Loves Raymond, Criminal Minds, Six Feet Under, Becker, and more recently in a recurring role as the "cat lady" neighbor, Alberta Fromme on Desperate Housewives.
