= Susan Mayer =

Fictional character on Desperate Housewives

- Desperate Housewives character
- Portrayed by: Teri Hatcher
- Duration: 2004–12
- First appearance: "Pilot"; 1x01, October 3, 2004
- Last appearance: "Finishing the Hat"; 8x23, May 13, 2012
- Created by: Marc Cherry
In-universe information
- Other names: Susan Bremmer (maiden name); Susan Mayer (seasons 1–3 and 5); Susan Delfino (season 4 and since season 6); Susie Q (by Karl)
- Occupation: Nanny; Webcam lingerie model Art teacher Author and children's book illustrator Housewife
- Father: Addison Prudy
- Mother: Sophie Bremmer
- Stepfather: Morty Flickman
- Stepmother: Carol Prudy
- Siblings: Unnamed paternal half siblings
- Husband: Karl Mayer (m. 1989; div. 2003) (m. 2006; div. 2006); Mike Delfino (m. 2007; div. 2010) (m. 2014; died 2017)
- Children: Julie Mayer; M.J. Delfino
- Stepsons: Zach Young
- Granddaughters: Sophie Scavo
- Aunts: Claire Bremmer
- First cousins: Tim Bremmer

Susan Mayer is a fictional character played by Teri Hatcher on the ABC television series Desperate Housewives. The character was created by television producer and screenwriter Marc Cherry. She first appeared in the pilot episode of the series on October 3, 2004, and appeared in every episode until the series finale on May 13, 2012. Susan resides on the fictional Wisteria Lane in Fairview, Eagle State, the primary setting of the show. One of four lead characters, Susan is characterized as being a "notoriously clumsy" romantic with a "magnetic charm." Her storylines tend to focus on her romantic relationships, most notably with Mike Delfino (James Denton), whom she marries twice in the series.

Cherry created Susan as a girl next door archetype and intended for the character to provide an emotional anchor for the series. When developing the character, Cherry drew upon his personal experiences as well as those of single women in his life. The role was written for Mary-Louise Parker, who turned it down; as a result, Hatcher was cast in early 2004. Hatcher's portrayal of the character is both comedic and vulnerable. During the series' debut season, both the character and Hatcher's performance received positive critical reception; however, as the series progressed, the character was received less favorably by critics and fans. Hatcher has received both a Golden Globe Award and Screen Actors Guild Award for her performance in the series.

== Development and casting ==
While developing the series, Desperate Housewives creator Marc Cherry envisioned Susan as a girl next door and chose her to convey this image. In the original pilot, the character's surname was spelled "Meyer" but had to be changed to "Mayer" for clearance purposes. Cherry commented, "I knew Susan was going to be my anchor character, and I didn't really know my take on her at first. And then it occurred to me that one of these women should be divorced ... I thought there was something so real about a woman saying, 'I don't have much time left,' and when this available hunky guy moves onto the street, something in her saying 'Let me at him'". The character is a compendium of single mothers in Cherry's life "desperate to land a man". He also drew upon his own personal experiences while creating the character.

Julia Louis-Dreyfus expressed interest in the role, but ABC executives felt she was not right for the part. Actors considered for the role include Courteney Cox, Calista Flockhart, Heather Locklear, Mary-Louise Parker, and Sela Ward. Cherry wrote the part with Parker in mind, but she rejected the offer, later explaining "it just didn’t feel like I was gonna [sic] serve it as well as someone else might". Teri Hatcher auditioned for the role in January 2004 and impressed Cherry immediately. After a second audition, Hatcher read for the role in front of network executives. Cherry praised her performance, saying "it was the best audition I've ever seen in network". Hatcher later commented, "I don't think they were hot to hire me for Susan ... I was maybe on a B-list, certainly not an A-list". Despite her reservations, Hatcher was the third reported cast member to have been cast in the series on February 18, 2004.

== Personality and characteristics ==
...[I]t was common knowledge on Wisteria Lane [that] where Susan Mayer went, bad luck was sure to follow. Her misfortunes ranged from the commonplace, to the unusual, to the truly bizarre.

— Mary Alice Young

Susan is primarily characterized as the girl next door. Teri Hatcher stated "I’m not exactly her, but I get her. I get her insecurities, her flaws." She called the character "a great representation of what [everyone] deals with daily. Our responsibilities can be overwhelming and things often don't go as you planned, so you have to roll with it. Susan celebrates rolling with it". She is a hopeless romantic and often expresses her feelings more openly and vulnerably than the other characters in the series. The series begins a year after Susan's first divorce, when she is still emotionally raw. Throughout the series, several other characters have confronted Susan about her inability to live happily and without drama. Susan has a close relationship with her daughter, Julie (Andrea Bowen), who often acts as the parent figure in the relationship.

Susan's accident-proneness is commonly used throughout the series to provide comic relief. Her susceptibility to bad luck and embarrassing situations have created some of the series' most memorable moments, including accidentally burning down Edie's house and being locked out of her own house completely naked. Susan's poor cooking skills have also become a running gag in the series.

== Storylines ==
=== Past ===
Susan poses with her first husband, Karl, and their daughter, Julie, while having a picnic in a park.

Susan Bremmer was born on December 8, 1966 and was raised by single mother Sophie Bremmer (Lesley Ann Warren), who told her that her father was a member of the United States Merchant Marine who had died in the Battle of Hanoi during the Vietnam War. She was a cheerleader in high school and graduated as valedictorian of her class. She graduated from community college with an art degree. Eventually, Susan began writing and illustrating children's books, the first of which was Ants in My Picnic Basket.

In 1989 Susan married Karl Mayer (Richard Burgi) after two months of dating, and in 1990 gave birth to their only daughter, Julie. The following year, the family moved to Wisteria Lane in Fairview, Eagle State, where Susan quickly befriends Mary Alice Young (Brenda Strong), her new neighbor. Susan became close friends with Katherine Davis (Dana Delany) and Bree Van de Kamp (Marcia Cross) in 1994, however Katherine had to move out one year later. Still, she gained friends in Lynette Scavo (Felicity Huffman) in 1996, and Gabrielle Solis (Eva Longoria) in 2003 when they move to Wisteria Lane. In 2003, Karl had an affair with his secretary, Brandi (Anne Dudek), and ended up falling for her, leaving Susan and abandoning Julie. The two divorced and agreed to share custody of Julie, although the court ruled that Julie would be living with her mother.

=== Season 1 ===
One year after the divorce, Susan has started to consider dating again, even if that means dating someone who makes fun of her cooking. Susan takes an interest in Mike Delfino (James Denton), a plumber she meets at Mary Alice’s wake, who tells her he has recently moved in the neighborhood, renting the Simms’ house. Susan soon begins dating Mike, despite competing with realtor Edie Britt (Nicollette Sheridan) for his affection. Meanwhile, Susan begins investigating Mary Alice's suicide after she and her friends discover a blackmail letter while putting away her belongings, one week after her funeral. Later, Susan discovers that Mary Alice's husband, Paul (Mark Moses), had their son, Zach (Cody Kasch), committed to a youth mental institution after he broke into the Van de Kamps’ house and decorated it for Christmas, Julie begins corresponding with Zach without Susan's knowledge and hides him in her room when he escapes from the institution. When Susan finds Zach in her home, she and Mike return him to Paul; however, Julie and Zach begin dating. Paul fabricates unconvincing lies to thwart Susan's efforts to discover his family's secrets too.

As her relationship with Mike progresses, Susan becomes suspicious of his past, especially when she finds a gun and large sums of money in his kitchen cabinet. Additionally, evidence connecting Mike to the recent murder of a Wisteria Lane resident, Martha Huber (Christine Estabrook), surfaces. Susan ends the relationship when police inform her that Mike was convicted of manslaughter and drug trafficking. However, Susan learns the murder was accidental and the two renew their relationship, with Mike deciding to move in with Susan. While Mike is away on business, Susan finds Zach, armed with a handgun, in Mike's house. He vows to kill Mike when he comes home as he believes Mike killed Paul.

=== Season 2 ===
When Mike arrives home, Zach's murder scheme backfires and he runs away. Mike informs Susan that he recently learned that Zach is his biological son. Susan agrees to help Mike search for Zach and finds him in a nearby park. When Zach expresses hope of rekindling his romance with Julie, she gives him money to look for Paul in Utah. When Mike finds out about her betrayal, he ends their relationship. Susan decides to write an autobiography following the break-up. While researching her father, she learns that her mother lied and her father is local business owner Addison Prudy (Paul Dooley). She tries to establish a relationship with her reluctant father, but her attempts are effectively unsuccessful.

Meanwhile, Susan is dismayed to learn that Karl has moved in with Edie. She begins dating her doctor, Ron McCready (Jay Harrington), who informs her that she has a wandering spleen and will need a splenectomy. When Susan learns that her health insurance will not cover the operation, Karl offers to temporarily remarry her long enough for her to be eligible for his medical benefits. They agree to keep their sham marriage a secret from Edie and Ron. While under anesthesia before her operation, Susan professes her love for Mike to Ron, which prompts Ron to break up with her. Soon after, Karl leaves Edie, as his love for Susan has resurfaced. Upon learning that Susan is the other woman, Edie intentionally burns down Susan's house. In this time of need, both Mike and Karl vie for Susan's affections. She chooses to rekindle her relationship with Mike and Karl signs the divorce papers. Susan and Mike then make plans to meet for dinner at nearby Torch Lake, where Mike plans to propose. On his way to dinner, Mike gets run over by Orson Hodge (Kyle MacLachlan), a dentist whom Susan had recently befriended, and is left in a coma.

=== Season 3 ===
Mike, Susan, and Julie embrace following the couple's private wedding ceremony.

Season 3 opens six months after the hit-and-run on Mike. While waiting for him to wake up, Susan reluctantly enters a relationship with Ian Hainsworth (Dougray Scott), a British man whose wife Jane (Cecily Gambrell) has been in a coma for years. When Mike finally awakens, doctors conclude that he now suffers from retrograde amnesia. Unfortunately, Susan is out of town with Ian when Mike wakes up. Edie takes advantage of this to move in on Mike and claim that Susan was horrible to him during their relationship. Mike turns Susan away when she returns to Fairview. Having lost hope, Susan continues her romance with Ian. Meanwhile, Susan is suspicious of Orson, who has married Bree after a six month relationship and is alleged to have killed his missing ex-wife, Alma (Valerie Mahaffey). When Mike is arrested for the murder of Monique Polier (Kathleen York), Orson's former mistress, Edie breaks up with him, leaving him without bail. Susan defends Mike, which frustrates Ian. He reluctantly agrees to pay for Mike's bail if Susan breaks off all contact with him. Mike is eventually exonerated for the crime. Following Jane's death, Susan accepts Ian's marriage proposal.

As Mike slowly regains his memory, he recalls his feelings for Susan and challenges Ian for her affections. When Susan learns that the two had made a bet on her in a game of poker, she calls off the wedding and declares that she does not want to see either of them again. Realizing that letting both of them go is a mistake, Susan decides to take Ian back. However, he tells her that he cannot spend the rest of his life wondering if she is still in love with Mike, and he leaves. Susan and Mike reunite and become engaged. The couple get married in a private ceremony in the woods, with Julie as their only guest.

=== Season 4 ===
In the fourth season premiere, one month after her wedding, Susan learns that she is pregnant. While looking into their medical histories for the baby's interest, Mike is forced to admit to Susan that he lied about his father being dead. Susan visits Mike's father, Nick (Robert Forster), who is in jail for murder. Nick warns Susan that Mike is still troubled by demons of his past. With the stress of finances for the baby, Mike begins working overtime, despite an injury resulting from the hit-and-run over a year ago. He begins relying heavily on painkillers. Susan confronts Mike about his addiction, threatening to leave him if he does not enter rehab; he agrees to admit himself. After a devastating tornado hits Wisteria Lane, Bree, Orson, and their newborn grandson, Benjamin, move into Susan's house temporarily. During his stay, Orson develops a sleep walking habit and unconsciously admits to running over Mike with his car. Susan feels extremely betrayed and Bree, unable to forgive Orson, asks him to move out. Shortly after, Susan gives birth to a boy, whom she names Maynard, after Mike's deceased grandfather.

==== Five-year jump ====
In the five years that take place between seasons four and five, Susan and Mike get into a vehicular collision with another car. Although Susan and Mike survive, the occupants of the other car, Lila Dash (Marie Caldare) and her daughter Paige (Madeleine Michelle Dunn), are killed. Although Susan was driving, Mike takes the blame, as Susan did not have her license with her at the time. Susan feels incredibly guilty for taking the lives of Lila and Paige, but Mike insists it was not their fault. The argument over the topic becomes so great that it results in divorce. Giving up on love, Susan engages in a casual relationship with her house painter, Jackson Braddock (Gale Harold).

=== Season 5 ===
While Susan manages to keep her relationship with Jackson a secret from her friends and her son, nicknamed M.J., Jackson seeks a deeper connection with her. Soon enough, Mike and M.J. learn about the relationship. Jackson makes the sudden announcement that he is moving to nearby Riverton for work and asks Susan to come with him. After much consideration, Susan decides that she is unsure of what she wants and turns down Jackson's offer. Also, Mike moves across the street from Susan and begins dating her close friend and neighbor, Katherine Mayfair (Dana Delany). Realizing she cannot keep Mike from being happy, she gives the couple her blessing, despite still feeling uncomfortable. Susan and Mike decide to enroll M.J. in private school, and Susan takes a job as an assistant art teacher at the school to help pay for the tuition. With both Susan and Mike employed, M.J. spends more time under Katherine's care, which makes Susan uneasy. She is heartbroken to learn that Mike and Katherine have decided to move in with one another and become engaged.

Susan attempts to console Edie's husband, Dave Williams (Neal McDonough), following Edie's death. She explains the truth behind her own accident, completely unaware that Lila and Paige Dash were Dave's wife and daughter, respectively, and that he has been seeking revenge on Mike since moving to Wisteria Lane. Meanwhile, Jackson returns to Fairview and proposes to Susan, revealing that his visa has expired and he needs to marry an American citizen. When Susan learns that Mike, who is engaged to Katherine, will no longer have to pay alimony once she is married, she explains the false pretenses of her engagement. Dave, who now understands that Susan was driving the car that killed his family, overhears this and reports Jackson to immigration officials. With Jackson out of the picture, Dave invites Susan and M.J. on a fishing trip, planning to kill M.J. just like Susan killed his own child. Mike discovers Dave's plans and is able to save Susan and M.J. After the ordeal, Susan and Mike share a brief, yet romantic kiss. Dave is sent to a psychiatric hospital in Boston and two months later, Mike marries an unidentified bride.

=== Season 6 ===
Susan is identified as Mike's bride in the sixth season premiere. Her marriage to Mike destroys her friendship with Katherine. The night after the wedding, Julie is strangled outside of Susan's home. Julie slips into a coma following her attack. While waiting for her to awaken, Susan learns from Andrew that Julie has dropped out of medical school, was involved with a married man (revealed to be Angie Bolen's husband Nick), and had a pregnancy scare before her attack. When Julie awakens, she refuses to identify the married man she was seeing. Later in the season, Julie's attacker is revealed to be Eddie Orlofsky (Josh Zuckerman), a local young adult who is also responsible for a handful of murders in Fairview. Prior to the attack, Susan had taken Eddie on as an art student and he developed a crush on her. When he discovered that she was remarrying Mike and that she did not see him as a romantic suitor, he attacked Julie, mistaking her for Susan.

Katherine continues to pursue Mike, believing that he is still in love with her. Mike warns her to leave his family alone and claims he never truly loved her. After he leaves, Katherine calls the police and stabs herself with a knife with Mike's fingerprints on it, framing him. Susan, realizing that Katherine has suffered a total nervous breakdown, calls Katherine's adopted daughter, Dylan (Lyndsy Fonseca), who comes to town and has her mother committed for psychiatric observation. Susan later forgives Katherine once she recovers from her breakdown. Soon after, Mike reveals that he has accumulated an immense debt in the past year. Unable to balance their debt, Susan and Mike decide to move off Wisteria Lane and rent their house out temporarily. They move into an apartment across town while Paul Young rents their house on Wisteria Lane.

=== Season 7 ===
Susan accepts an offer from her landlady, Maxine Rosen (Lainie Kazan), to appear on a website in which she does housework in her lingerie in order to make ends meet, though she keeps her new job a secret from her friends and family. Soon after, Maxine's site is merged with a larger company that uses Susan's image to advertise the website on billboards across the country. Susan pays the company $9,000 to have the billboards removed. As a result, she begins working for the website's video chatting services to earn back the money. Paul discovers her secret and threatens to expose it unless she sells him her home, in which he now lives with his second wife, Beth (Emily Bergl). Hoping to derail Paul's blackmail scheme, Susan tells Mike about her job on the website. Paul retaliates by spreading the word about Susan's involvement with the website, causing her to lose her teaching job. Strapped for money, Mike accepts a job on an oil rig in Alaska and Susan becomes Lynette's nanny.

After purchasing a majority of the houses on Wisteria Lane, Paul announces that he plans to open a halfway house for ex-convicts on the street. A protest against his plan escalates into a violent riot and Susan is trampled by the unruly crowd. As a result, Susan loses a kidney and learns that her second kidney is deformed and she is at severe risk of renal failure. Susan reluctantly agrees to undergo dialysis while waiting for a transplant. After Paul throws her out, Beth submits paperwork indicating that in the event of her death, her kidney would be given to Susan, and then commits suicide. Despite initial refusal, Paul allows the operation to move forward and he and Susan reconcile. After discovering that Paul has been depressed following Beth's suicide, Susan begins cooking meals for him with the assistance of Felicia Tilman (Harriet Sansom Harris), Beth's mother and Martha Huber's sister, who secretly adds antifreeze to the food in an effort to kill him. Paul nearly dies as a result of the poisoned food. Unaware that Felicia is helping prepare his meals, Paul has Susan arrested for attempting to kill him. Eventually, Susan is released, Paul confesses to the murder of Martha Huber, and Felicia presumably dies in a car crash while fleeing town. Susan and her family move back onto Wisteria Lane. During a dinner party, Gabrielle's former stepfather, Alejandro (Tony Plana), who raped her during her childhood, attempts to harm Gabrielle until her husband, Carlos Solis (Ricardo Antonio Chavira) kills him. Susan, Lynette, and Bree agree to help cover up the crime.

=== Season 8 ===
Susan begins to withdraw from her friends and family out of guilt for having helped cover up Alejandro's death. She bonds with Carlos over their mutual guilt. When Mike begins suspecting Susan and Carlos are having an affair, they agree to tell him the truth about the cover-up. Soon after, Susan begins taking an art class with renowned painter, Andre Zeller (Miguel Ferrer), and discovers that her guilt has given her a renewed artistic ability. In a series of paintings, Susan depicts the scene of Alejandro's death and subsequent burial, arousing the suspicion of Detective Chuck Vance (Jonathan Cake), Bree's embittered ex-boyfriend assigned to investigate Alejandro's disappearance. She briefly considers moving to New York to explore new career opportunities, but ultimately decides against it. In an effort to ease her guilt, Susan visits Alejandro's wife and stepdaughter, Claudia (Justina Machado) and Marisa (Daniela Bobadilla), respectively, and write them a check to help their financial misfortune, which only arouses Claudia's suspicions. Claudia confronts Susan and Gabrielle about Alejandro's disappearance, but agrees to stop prying after learning that he had been sexually abusing Marisa.

In "Is This What You Call Love?", Susan learns that Julie is six months pregnant and has no relationship with the baby's father. To her dismay, Julie plans to put the child up for adoption. When Susan discovers that Lynette's son, Porter (Charlie Carver), is the father, she supports his decision to raise the child himself. In "You Take for Granted", Mike is murdered by a vengeful loan shark. The final episodes of the series deal with Susan grieving and eventually moving on from Mike's death. In the series finale, Julie gives birth to a daughter, whom she now plans on keeping. Susan sells her home on Wisteria Lane and she and M.J. move to help Julie raise the baby.

== Reception ==
=== Critical ===
In the first season of Desperate Housewives, the character of Susan was a critics' favorite and generally regarded as the series' most prominent role. Hatcher's portrayal as Susan received praise in the series' first year. Tim Goodman of the San Francisco Chronicle called Hatcher's performance in the pilot episode "a huge surprise," commenting that she gives "self-effacing, disheveled and sadly hopeless Susan a spirit that makes you root for her". Robert Bianco of USA Today declared that Hatcher delivered "a revelatory performance". Heather Havrilesky of Salon.com was less enthusiastic, criticizing Hatcher for overacting. In the series' second season, Susan becomes less important as Bree "comfortably moves into position as the show's lead". Many critics noted that the character suffered as a result of the declining quality of the second season. Bianco wrote that the writers were making Susan "too stupid". Hatcher continued to provide comic relief in the third season.

By season four, critics thought that Susan's storylines were the least interesting and that she had not "operated at full potential since [her] pivotal role in the debut season". Bianco was more forgiving, stating that while "Susan's silliness sometimes spirals out of control, Teri Hatcher usually manages to keep her likable". As a result of the five-year time jump between seasons four and five, a new direction was taken with Susan's character. The Stat-Legend's Alan Sepinwall calls Susan's character arc in season five the "least annoying storyline she's had in at least three years". However, Tanner Stransky of Entertainment Weekly still felt the character was "ever-annoying". In the series' sixth season, Stransky stated that Susan was still "whiny" and he would have rather seen Mike marry Katherine, though he was not surprised when the mystery bride was revealed to be Susan. Entertainment Weekly named her one of the "21 Most Annoying TV Characters Ever".

=== Awards ===
Hatcher won the Golden Globe Award for Best Performance by an Actress in a Television Comedy Series in 2005, beating out fellow cast members Marcia Cross and Felicity Huffman. Also that year, Hatcher received the Screen Actors Guild Award for Outstanding Performance by an Actress in a Comedy Series. In 2005, Hatcher, along with Cross and Huffman, received a nomination for a Satellite Award in the Best Television Actress in a Musical or Comedy Series. She was also nominated for an Emmy Award for Outstanding Lead Actress in a Comedy Series, but was beaten out by Huffman. In 2006, Hatcher was once again nominated for the Golden Globe Award in the same category, along with Cross, Huffman, and Eva Longoria. All four Desperate Housewives stars lost to Mary-Louise Parker. Hatcher was also nominated for a Teen Choice Award for Choice TV Actress and a People's Choice Award for Favorite Female TV Star.

=== Controversy ===
The producers of 'Desperate Housewives' and ABC Studios offer our sincere apologies for any offense caused by the brief reference in the season premiere. There was no intent to disparage the integrity of any aspect of the medical community in the Philippines ... As leaders in broadcast diversity, we are committed to presenting sensitive and respectful images of all communities featured in our programs.

— Apology issued by ABC on October 3, 2007

ABC and the Desperate Housewives producers faced criticism following the September 30, 2007 fourth season premiere in which the character of Susan made a controversial remark about Filipino doctors. When her gynecologist suggests that she may be entering menopause, Susan responds "OK, before we go any further, can I check these diplomas? Just to make sure they aren't, like, from some med school in the Philippines?" Following its broadcast, viewers demanded an apology from the network. ABC issued an apology on October 3, but the controversy grew to an international concern and Health Secretary Francisco Duque III of Manila publicly sought an apology from the series' producers. Protests against the network and series were staged, prompting ABC to remove the episode from digital and online platforms in order to apply edits. As a result, the line of controversy was removed from all future broadcasts of the episode, as well as from DVD productions. However, protests continued even after this action was taken. The scene with the line in question is still viewable on YouTube.

=== Cultural influences and merchandise ===
Nicole Parker portrayed Susan in a Desperate Housewives parody on an episode of MADtv. Susan's klutziness is mocked in the skit. Colette Whitaker voices Susan in the Desperate Housewives computer game, which was released in October 2006. In 2007, Madame Alexander released a line of 16-inch fashion dolls of the series' main characters, including Susan.
