= Bree Van de Kamp =

Fictional character on Desperate Housewives

- Desperate Housewives character
- Marcia Cross as Bree Van de Kamp (2012)
- Portrayed by: Marcia Cross; Carolyn Howard (2007, stand-in)
- Duration: 2004–12
- First appearance: "Pilot"; 1x01, October 3, 2004
- Last appearance: "Finishing the Hat"; 8x23, May 13, 2012
- Created by: Marc Cherry
In-universe information
- Other names: Bree Van de Kamp (season 1-3); Bree Hodge (season 3-7); Bree Weston (since season 8); Bree Mason (maiden name)
- Occupation: Member of Kentucky State Legislature; Entrepreneur; Cookbook author Caterer; Housewife
- Father: Henry Mason
- Stepmother: Eleanor Mason
- Husband: Rex Van de Kamp (m. 1987; died 2005) Orson Hodge (m. 2006; div. 2015) Trip Weston (m. 2017)
- Sons: Andrew Van de Kamp
- Daughters: Danielle Van de Kamp
- Stepsons: Sam Allen (via Rex)
- Grandchildren: Benjamin Van de Kamp (via Danielle)
- Aunts: Fern Mason
- Other relatives: Leo Katz; Alex Cominis; Phyllis Van de Kamp

Bree Van de Kamp is a fictional character on the ABC television series Desperate Housewives. She was played by actress Marcia Cross, who received multiple awards and nominations for her portrayal, including an Emmy Award nomination, three Golden Globe Award nominations, and two Screen Actors Guild Awards. Cross' portrayal of Bree was widely praised by critics and fans.

Cross auditioned for the role of Mary Alice Young, but series creator Marc Cherry thought she was better suited for the role of Bree. Dana Delany, who was eventually cast as Katherine Mayfair, was chosen for the role but turned it down, saying it was too similar to her role in Pasadena.

Bree Van de Kamp is one of the four main protagonists in Desperate Housewives. Bree's main struggle throughout the series was her attempts to maintain a perfect life despite various obstacles such as widowhood, divorce, and alcoholism hindering her. She married Rex Van de Kamp (Steven Culp), Orson Hodge (Kyle MacLachlan), and Trip Weston (Scott Bakula) and had relationships with various other men.

== Character profile ==
Bree Mason grew up in Rhode Island when her father married a woman named Eleanor, after her mother's death, with whom she did not get along. In order to escape her stepmother's demands, Bree left for Lake Forest College near Chicago. Bree also mentioned on one of Eleanor's visits that she had to work for every kind word she was ever given by her stepmother. Bree met Rex Van de Kamp at a meeting of the Young Republicans. After they graduated, they married and had two children, Andrew and Danielle, and moved to Fairview.

Bree was very much written as an exaggerated version of the characteristics often attributed to White Anglo-Saxon Protestants; she has been called a "hyper-uptight WASP". Bree is recognized for her perfectionistic attitude and work ethic, which at times bordered on neurosis. Her perfectionism may stem from when her mother was killed in a hit-and-run; a 10-year-old Bree cleaned her blood off the road outside the house. She said that once everything was spotless, she felt much better.

Bree is known for her homemaking talents at the level of Martha Stewart, particularly her gourmet meals, breakfast treats, and pineapple bran muffins. She's also well versed in firearms; she owns 4 guns and is a card-carrying member of the National Rifle Association. Bree supports the Republican Party, as stated in the season 3 opener, and was also known for being a member of the local Presbyterian church, as seen in the episode, Sunday. Her neighbors, Angie Bolen, Gabrielle Solis, and Renee Perry, nicknamed her "Nancy Reagan" on occasions.

Bree lived at 4354 Wisteria Lane in Fairview since 1994 and was also said to have a timeshare residence in Aspen that she never uses. Bree is based on creator Marc Cherry's own mother, and the Van de Kamp family is based on the family in which he grew up. Bree's family was based on Marc Cherry's teen years, while Lynette Scavo's family was based on Marc Cherry's childhood years. Bree and her first husband, Rex, were both named after the overtly vain characters on two of Marc Cherry's previous failed sitcoms, The 5 Mrs. Buchanans (Bree) and The Crew (Rex).

Both of Bree's marriages broke down and ended in divorce (however, Rex died before their divorce was finalized); following their requests for divorce, both of Bree's former husbands attempted reconciliation with her. Rex succeeded, whereas her second husband, Orson Hodge, did not. During the breakdown of her second marriage, Bree had an affair with Karl Mayer, her divorce lawyer and the ex-husband of her friend, Susan Mayer. However, Bree did remarry in the series finale to her lawyer, Trip Weston, making him her third husband.

Bree is the only one of the main four housewives to not appear in every episode. Appearing only as a stand-in in "My Husband, The Pig", Bree is totally absent in its six following episodes ("Dress Big", "Liaisons", "God, That's Good", "Gossip", "Into the Woods", and "What Would We Do Without You?") due to Cross' pregnancy.

== Storylines ==
=== Backstory ===
Bree Mason was born on February 11, 1962. When she was 10 years old, her mother taught her a lesson about "masking" so she could hide true feelings and emotions, which prevented her from being able to be hurt by men. During Christmas 1972, her mother died in hospital after a car accident. Bree stayed at home and cleaned her mother's blood from the driveway. She felt relieved after that. Her father then married Eleanor (Carol Burnett). Bree had to earn respect from her stepmother and so worked very hard. Eleanor said to her stepdaughter that she was very lucky and possessed beauty, wit, cunning, and insight: weapons all women needed to survive in the world. Her dad took care of his daughter and tried to raise her to be a classy lady.

Bree was first engaged to her boyfriend, Ty Grant, but after she met Rex Van de Kamp, the two fell in love during their college years. Bree and Rex got married in 1987. Bree gave birth to their son Andrew in 1988 and daughter Danielle in 1989. The family moved in 1994 to 4354 Wisteria Lane, Fairview. She gave a bad first impression to Mary Alice Young and Susan Mayer, local neighbors and friends, after Andrew stole a ceramic frog from the Youngs' backyard. Bree, Susan, and Mary Alice later become close friends. In 1998, Lynette Scavo joined the group. Five years later, after a short and difficult first impression of Gabrielle Solis, all four women accepted the ex-model as their friend.

=== Season 1 ===
Bree is introduced as the "perfect" wife and mother. However, it becomes apparent that her emotional coldness and obsession with appearances makes her family resent her, and as her husband Rex puts it, "I just can't live in this detergent commercial anymore".

She insists she and Rex have marriage guidance counseling with Dr. Albert Goldfine (Sam Lloyd) when he wants a divorce and demands that Andrew and Danielle refuse presents from their father if they want to continue living with her. Unfortunately, in Andrew's case, this leads to him driving drunk and accidentally running over Carlos Solis's mother, leaving her in a coma. Rex and Bree conceal this to protect him but Bree is soon disappointed with his lack of remorse. Determined to make him realize that there are consequences to his actions, she gets him kicked off the swimming team by reporting marijuana he had hidden in his swim locker and then anonymously tipping off his coach.

Bree is determined to keep her family together until Rex has a heart attack, leading her to discover that he regularly visits a prostitute. Worse still, the prostitute turns out to be an acquaintance of hers, Maisy Gibbons (Sharon Lawrence), who is later arrested for living off of immoral earnings. Maisy is persuaded to cut a plea deal with the district attorney, naming her clients, and despite a request from Bree, Maisy does not remove Rex's name. Furious, Bree tells Rex she will divorce him but is "persuaded" by Andrew and Danielle to look after him while he recuperates. Initially wanting to hurt him, Bree starts dating their pharmacist, George Williams (Roger Bart), but ends things when Rex asks her to give their marriage another chance. She and George agree to be just friends. Wanting to deter Rex from visiting prostitutes, she reluctantly takes part in S&M scenarios with him.

Concerned about Andrew's worsening behavior, she is cheered up when Rex backs her up on one occasion. Unfortunately, this fails to make any difference, so Rex and Bree feel that they have no choice but to send Andrew away to a boot camp. While there, Andrew reveals to his parents that he is gay. Bree initially tells him that she will always love him regardless but quietly insists to Rex that they take Andrew home immediately, worried about what he might be doing with the other boys at night, and asks their vicar to give Andrew some counseling on lifestyle, believing that his soul is in danger. This has disastrous results, as Andrew thinks she doesn't love him and deliberately hurts her. Bree continues to confide in George about her family problems but, after Rex makes it clear that Bree will stay with him, George begins tampering with Rex's medication. This is uncovered when Rex has a second heart attack. Believing Bree was responsible, Rex writes a note forgiving her and dies. Bree's final scenes in the season involve her receiving the bad news and breaking down in tears.

=== Season 2 ===
Bree's mother-in-law, Phyllis (Shirley Knight), visits for her son's funeral. She annoys Bree with her constant sniping and excessive displays of grief to the point that Bree refuses to let her attend Rex's funeral, but Andrew persuades her to. The final straw, however, is when she discovers that Phyllis has reported her friendship with George to Rex's life insurance provider. Bree sends Phyllis home and is questioned by the police about meddling with Rex's medication. She is cleared and is furious when she discovers the note Rex had left her which claimed he thought she murdered him, and she starts dating George. However, George constantly tries to rush things, making her uneasy. When George places an announcement of their engagement in the newspaper, an ex-fiancée of his, Leila Mitzman, visits Bree to warn her about him. Bree is horrified and sends Leila away, but she is proved right when George loses his temper upon seeing Bree dance with Ty Grant, and she also finds out that he threw Dr. Goldfine over the side of a bridge for suggesting to Bree that she take their relationship slowly. George tries blackmailing her into a reconciliation by taking some pills and admits to killing Rex. Devastated, Bree says that she has called an ambulance and it will be there soon, but in reality, she hasn't. She watches him die and tells Andrew, who tries blackmailing her for his trust fund.

Events with Rex, George, and Andrew take their toll and she starts drinking heavily. She realizes she has a problem when she loses Lynette's children after passing out while babysitting. Andrew later begins making accusations about Bree physically abusing him and tries to seek emancipation rights, which Bree refuses. In denial, but not wanting Andrew to get his trust fund or give up on him, Bree joins Alcoholics Anonymous (AA) but only takes it seriously after passing out in a shop changing room and not waking up until late at night. Her AA sponsor, Peter McMillan (Lee Tergesen), and a security guard let her out. Bree also faces more turmoil when she discovers her new neighbors, the Applewhites, are hiding from the police and she is blackmailed into silence. To distract herself from her alcoholism, she has a brief relationship with Peter, who is addicted to sex. However, Andrew discovers this and seduces Peter to get revenge on Bree for denying him his trust fund. She dumps Peter and abandons Andrew at a gas station after discovering that they slept together and in her bed.

Bree's mental health deteriorates rapidly following this and nobody can help her as her behavior becomes erratic and spirals out of control, including creating a scene at Danielle's birthday party. Danielle, meanwhile, starts dating Matthew Applewhite and moves out to be with him. However, Matthew's mother, Betty Applewhite, realizes Matthew murdered an ex-girlfriend, Melanie Foster, but made her believe his brother did it. Betty tells Bree, who has checked herself into a psychiatric unit and later escapes after they refuse to let her leave. Bree and Betty rush to Bree's house to find Matthew and Danielle have taken money from Bree's safe. Bree confronts Matthew about Melanie and refuses to let them leave, so he threatens to shoot her, only to be shot dead by a police sniper. Bree's final scenes involve her beginning a new friendship with the mysterious Orson Hodge.

=== Season 3 ===
After a six-month relationship, Bree marries Orson, but their marriage is troubled by the belief that Orson physically abused his first wife, Alma (Valerie Mahaffey), and murdered her. She becomes overwhelmed with guilt to see Andrew on TV, reduced to living on the streets, and tracks him down only to be rebuffed. Shortly after the wedding, Orson persuades Andrew to come home and they reconcile.

However, the arrival of Orson's mother, Gloria (Dixie Carter), and Alma's return cause more trouble. They drug and rape Orson but Bree intervenes, learning that Gloria murdered Orson's mistress, Monique Polier, so he would stay with Alma. Gloria tries to kill Bree but Orson intervenes. Gloria has a severe stroke after Orson holds her head under water to get her to let go of the knife with which she is trying to kill Bree. Orson carries Gloria's body outside and places it next to Alma's body — Alma having died when she fell off the roof of her house while trying to escape to warn Bree about Gloria.

Danielle, meanwhile, finds herself pregnant by Edie Britt's nephew Austin McCann (Josh Henderson). She is sent away so the neighborhood won't learn of her pregnancy and Bree and Orson decide to fake a pregnancy so they can raise Danielle's child as their own.

Bree is not in episodes 3.16 to 3.22 as she is on honeymoon with Orson and Danielle. Bree returns for Gabrielle and Victor's wedding, heavily pregnant, or so it seems...

=== Season 4 ===
Bree and Orson struggle to make people think she is pregnant but is dismayed by people wanting to feel the baby move. Phyllis discovers Bree's pregnancy hoax and tries convincing Danielle to raise the child herself. Bree and Orson, however, persuade Danielle to give them the baby by offering to send her to college and buy her a convertible. Danielle has a baby boy and gives him to Bree — who names him Benjamin Tyson Hodge (surname later changed to Katz) — and agrees that Bree and Orson will raise him.

Bree develops a rivalry with new neighbor, Katherine Mayfair (Dana Delany). Bree and Katherine are very similar, leading to a series of feuds before eventually becoming friends and going into business together, catering dinner parties.

After a tornado damages Bree's house, she, Orson, and Benjamin stay with Susan and Mike Delfino. During this time, Orson begins sleepwalking, twice being caught naked by Susan. Things come to a head when Julie catches him confessing to running over Mike. While Mike and Susan are willing to forgive Orson for his crime, Bree is horrified and kicks him out. During their separation, Edie Britt comes onto Orson, leading to a feud between her and Bree. Edie discovers Benjamin is Bree's grandson and attempts to blackmail her. Bree, however, tells the other housewives the truth, so they all snub Edie.

In the season finale, Katherine saves Bree's life by telling her ex-husband, Wayne Davis (Gary Cole), her secrets. When Katherine kills Wayne, Bree and the other housewives tell the police that Katherine was terrified of a stalker so that she doesn't go to prison.

When the events of the series shift ahead by five years in the fourth-season finale, it is revealed that Bree is now a famous cookbook author, and Andrew works with her as her assistant. Bree and Orson have evidently worked out their problems and are still together.

=== Season 5 ===
Bree has just published her own cookbook, and is successfully running the catering business. She and Orson reconcile after he went to prison for running over Mike. A flashback sequence reveals that while Bree awaited Orson's release, Danielle returned and took Benjamin, leaving her completely alone. Devastated, Bree relapsed into alcoholism but overcame it, thanks to Katherine.

Bree puts her career first, alienating her friends at times and causing a rift between her and Orson. As revenge, Orson begins stealing, initially to punish people who he feels have been rude and to hurt Bree. Orson agrees to stop stealing, but when he is injured while attempting to rob an old woman (and indirectly causes Edie's death when she crashes her car into a telephone pole trying to avoid him) and tries to convince people that the old woman is senile, she decides she has had enough. She hires Karl Mayer as her divorce lawyer, who helps her stage a fake burglary so she can hide her preciously expensive assets in a storage unit and not risk losing them in the divorce proceedings. However, Orson discovers her plan, threatening to send her to prison for insurance fraud unless she stays with him. Bree agrees reluctantly but shares a passionate kiss with Karl.

=== Season 6 ===
Initially, Bree is unwilling to sleep with Karl, despite her marriage being strained. Orson, however, is determined to salvage their marriage, commenting that guilt is sometimes necessary for happiness, and defending his use of blackmail so that she'll stay with him. Bree takes this motto as her own and consummates her affair with Karl.

When Julie is hospitalized after being attacked, Bree worries that she will lose Susan's friendship upon hearing that Susan would hypothetically no longer talk to a friend who dated Karl. However, Karl's fragility convinces Bree he needs her and she begins falling for him, acknowledging her feelings when they attend the same event and Karl brings another woman. This distracts her from her business, causing her to only realize the extent of Katherine's instability when an event is ruined. Bree dismisses her and, after getting to know new neighbor Angie Bolen (Drea de Matteo), hires her instead. Meanwhile, Karl's romantic gestures make their affair harder to hide. Suspicious, Orson gets Angie to spy on Bree. Angie discovers the affair, and helps Bree hide Karl when Orson comes home early and attempts to catch them in the act, but afterwards challenges Bree about her feelings for these two men. As Bree sees it, she connects intellectually with Orson but sexually with Karl, and is worried that their relationship will only ever be physical, despite his promises to change.

Bree's fears are realized when Susan catches her and Karl together at a motel. They fight, but despite her initial unhappiness, Susan eventually gives them her blessing. In order to get away from Orson, Karl suggests Bree threaten him, which she does by hiring an ex-con Orson met in prison to meet with him, and capturing the meeting on a hidden camera. She takes the pictures to Orson, which serve as proof of him breaking his parole, and demands a divorce. Stunned, Orson reveals that he had been bluffing when he threatened to turn her in for the insurance fraud, and goes to pack, but discovers her affair with Karl when Karl confesses to him at the annual Wisteria Lane Christmas block party, in part due to the fact that he'd hired a plane to fly a banner over the party with a message asking Bree to marry him. A fight breaks out between the two men, and Bree tries intervening, to no success. The fight is ended when the pilot of the banner plane suffers a fatal heart attack at the controls and the plane subsequently crashes into the party, killing Karl and leaving Orson paralyzed.

Feeling guilty, Bree insists Orson come home so she can look after him but he is disgusted by her infidelity and takes advantage. Angry about his lack of manners and personal hygiene, Bree hoses him down but stops when he explains how angry he is with the way his life is now. Wanting to help, Bree gets two disabled men to visit, but Orson asks her to let him kill himself, telling her that he wants to die because no one loves him. When asked, Bree can't say the words, but seeing Orson trying to drown himself at a party of an old married couple with such passion causes Bree to realize that she still wants things to work with Orson. She stops him by telling him how much she cares and wants to recapture what they once had, and they reconcile.

A young man named Sam Allen (Samuel Page) visits Bree, offering himself as a new assistant. Impressed by Sam's skills, Bree promotes him to vice-president, much to Andrew's anger. While visiting Sam's home, Bree is stunned to learn that Sam is a son that Rex had from a relationship he had prior to meeting Bree. Sam admits that he's spent years watching Bree's family, wondering why Rex chose them over him, and after his mother's death, came to see Bree. Shocked by this, Bree welcomes Sam into her life but finds herself at odds with Andrew, who suspects Sam has an ulterior motive. Sam plots to make Bree fire Andrew, which she does, but after she reveals that she and Andrew have a love-and-hate relationship, it's likely that Andrew will return. After she tells Orson about a sabotaged dinner, suspecting Andrew, Orson points out that Andrew couldn't be responsible because it was well planned, making Bree suspect Sam's true intentions. She discovers that Sam's mother is still alive and reveals that Sam found a letter from Rex, offering to take full custody of him. Bree confronts Sam about his lies and he angrily smashes a vase before leaving. She apologizes to Andrew but tells him and Orson she's not firing Sam for fear of how he might react.

In the season finale, Bree does try firing Sam but he retaliates by revealing he's found out about Andrew's hit-and-run years before (a drunken Danielle told him). He threatens to tell the police unless Bree turns over control of the company to him. Bree reluctantly agrees to do so, while telling Sam she feels sorry for him losing his chance to be part of a family and suspects no one will ever truly care for him. Orson, who had not known what Andrew did, calls out Bree on the hypocrisy of demanding he go to jail for running Mike over but hiding Andrew's crime. He is both appalled and furious at Bree for this and announces he's moving out. Bree tells Andrew she now knows Orson was right and is seen about to confess to Gabrielle.

=== Season 7 ===
Bree confesses to covering up the demise of Carlos' mother. Gabrielle chooses not to tell her husband. After discovering her ex-husband has a new girlfriend only a week after they separated, Bree decides to redecorate the ground floor of her house, hiring Keith Watson (Brian Austin Green) to help, but finds herself attracted to him. While looking at him from her car, she does not see Juanita Solis (Madison De La Garza) behind her before reversing, leading to Juanita being admitted to the hospital. Upon finding out that Keith has a girlfriend, she agrees to go out clubbing with Renee Perry. She finds out that Keith broke up with his girlfriend, but he is instead going home with Renee. Bree sabotages their night and eventually asks Keith on a date. This begins Bree and Renee's fight over Keith.

Later, Bree only mentions to Keith's father Richard that she's finally a divorcee. Learning this, Richard, who has been having feelings for Bree, tries to make a move to destroy Bree's and Keith's relationship so that he can have Bree instead. Keith attempts to propose to Bree and after the second failed attempt, Keith begins to question his relationship with Bree. Richard manipulates Keith's mind by warning him that Bree might be using him as a diversion from her actual feelings after her divorce from Orson. As a result, Keith begins to avoid Bree. Richard then abruptly kisses Bree, and after he leaves, Bree tells Keith everything about his father's attempts to tear them apart. Later, Keith confronts Richard about this and has a fistfight with him but when rioters, who are opposing Paul Young's plan to open a halfway house for ex-convicts on Wisteria Lane, see the two fight, they mistake Keith for an ex-convict due to his tattoos and ex-convict-like clothing and begin to attack him. Bree breaks up the fight by firing a gun into the air. This triggers fear and panic among the rioters and supporters for the halfway house alike, thinking this is an assassination attempt, culminating in a human stampede that spirals out of control.

Bree is thrown when Orson returns, claiming he was dumped by his girlfriend. Keith is annoyed at how Bree is willing to let Orson stay with them. Over dinner, Orson makes it clear he doesn't think Keith is a good choice for Bree as they have nothing in common and Orson understands her more, with the two even resorting to throwing food at one another. Bree goes to see Orson's ex, who reveals that Orson was the one who broke up with her as he's still in love with Bree. She confronts him and Orson confesses how he feels and thinks Bree is too good for Keith. Keith is angered at Bree continuing to want Orson to stay with them, saying that she's still in love with Orson. Bree responds by shoving him down in her manure-covered lawn, getting herself dirty, to prove how much she's changed. When one of Keith's old girlfriends comes by, Bree is suspicious and discovers the woman has been raising Keith's son. She mentions children to Keith, who seems unsure whether he is father material. Bree goes to the girlfriend, lying about how Keith doesn't want to know the child. Keith finds her cutting up her roses as she says "you have to be ruthless to protect what you want". Bree meets the woman later to lend her money and when she leaves her son in Bree's care, Keith drops by the pizza parlor. Seeing Keith and the boy instantly bonding, Bree is overcome with guilt and confesses to Keith that the boy is actually his son. Keith desperately wants to be with his son, but he doesn't want to leave Bree, so he pitches the idea of moving to Florida with Bree but she refuses to leave her home and friends. The next day Bree makes the ultimate decision and tells Keith that he must go to Florida for his son. She sacrifices their relationship and Keith leaves.

Bree discovers that Andrew has started drinking again, so much so that his husband leaves him. She encourages Andrew to go to rehab but is jarred when he decides to make amends by telling Carlos about running over his mother. When Carlos invites Andrew on a camping trip, Bree and Gabrielle fear the worst and follow them. Seeing Carlos with a bloody towel and a dirty shovel, Bree blurts out what Andrew did, just before her son enters the cabin. Carlos is outraged over this but eventually forgives Andrew. However, when Bree comes to thank him for not pressing charges, Carlos coldly tells her he won't forgive her for hiding the truth all these years, that they're no longer friends, and that she and Gabby can no longer be friends. Bree ends up taking Gabby and her daughters into her house when Gabby leaves Carlos after telling him that she refuses to end her friendship with Bree. While the Solises are staying with Bree, she has a run-in with Detective Chuck Vance (Jonathan Cake), who was on Wisteria Lane to check on parolee Felicia Tillman. Juanita Solis calls the police and tells them that Bree is trying to kill her and Celia (after Carlos tells her about Bree's involvement in her grandmother's death). Chuck responds to the call at Bree's home and Carlos sorts everything out, explaining that the girls misunderstood what he had told them. Chuck leaves and gives Bree his number, and the Solises move out of Bree's and back with Carlos.

Chuck later returns to give Bree his number again after assuming she'd lost it since he hasn't received a call from her. Bree then agrees to go out on a date with him that night and when Bree tells this to Renee, Renee runs a background check on Chuck and reveals to Bree that he's still married (though he had filed for divorce a year ago). At dinner, Bree confronts Chuck with this information but Chuck retaliates by telling her that he had also run a background check on her, therefore becoming more aware of Bree's past. Offended, Bree abruptly ends their date and as Chuck drives her home, Chuck catches a hooker in the street and brings her back to her women's shelter. There, Chuck tells the hooker (who believes that she'll be a hooker forever) that she can turn her life around, pretending to reveal that Bree once was a prostitute and she had turned over a new leaf by going to school and starting a massive catering company. Moved by Chuck's sincere words, Bree gives Chuck a second chance and the two agree to go out on another date afterwards.

During the "progressive dinner party" celebrating Susan's return to Wisteria Lane, Bree (along with Lynette and Susan) walks into Gaby's house to discover that Carlos has murdered Gaby's abusive stepfather Alejandro Perez. She spearheads the decision to cover up the murder to protect Carlos, thus earning his forgiveness for keeping the secret about his mother's hit-and-run for all those years.

=== Season 8 ===
Following their agreement to cover up the murder of Alejandro, Bree's relationship with Chuck begins to suffer. She finds herself constantly paranoid that he will discover her involvement and uses sex as a way to distract him. She then receives a note exactly like the one Mary Alice received when she shot herself. She then seeks out the counsel of Paul Young, asking if he was the one who sent it. Upset over the fact that Bree may still judge him for his past, he sends her away. However, he later calls her back, urging her to tell the other housewives to spare her Mary Alice's fate and reveals to her the only other person who he told about the note to was the cop who was looking into Martha Huber's death, Chuck. At first suspicious, Bree decides to break up with Chuck when he tries to propose. He does not take it well, telling her she is making a big mistake. Danielle returns, having been dumped by her husband, and Bree is at first supportive until she finds out her daughter is now selling adult swings to make money.

Having avoided church over her guilt in hiding Alejandro, Bree is convinced to help Ben Faulkner in cooking for a soup kitchen. When a passing college student raves over her cooking, the kitchen is soon home to regular people, not the homeless, and Bree realizes that she has wrongly prioritized her own culinary career over helping people. She tells everyone to leave, giving a speech on how the soup kitchen is meant to help the less fortunate. Ben is impressed and has Bree give a speech to the city council to convince them to let Ben build a homeless shelter in Fairview. Bree is initially happy about helping Ben until she realizes the spot Ben is about to break ground on is where the girls buried Alejandro. She, Gabrielle, and Lynette go to dig the body back up only to find it gone. It turns out Ben found it earlier, thinking he was just a drifter, and Bree convinces him to help keep it quiet. However, Bree soon finds Chuck is suspicious and putting together clues to prove what the girls did. The pressure soon drives Bree to break her sobriety and pour herself a drink.

Chuck starts to dig deeper into Gabrielle's stepfather's disappearance. Gabrielle tells Bree that Chuck brought them in for questioning and Bree snaps, causing her to head to a motel. When she arrives, she sits at a table in her room, pulls out a bottle of wine and a gun, and begins talking to the spirit of Mary Alice who has appeared sitting in front of her. Bree asks her if she is happy after having killed herself and Mary Alice replies, "I'm not unhappy". Bree is ready to kill herself when Renee kicks in the door, mistakenly believing Bree is with Ben. After yelling, threatening to hit her, and telling her she's "nothing more than a skank in a Nancy Reagan nightie", Renee notices the gun and the note. After reading it, she takes Bree home and stays there to make sure she's okay. When Renee says she won't let a friend die, Bree points out they're not quite friends, hurting Renee. She confesses to Bree how her own mother committed suicide and makes Bree see it's not the way out. Bree is happy at first, more so when she hears Chuck was killed in a hit-and-run. However, when she opens her mailbox, she finds a note saying "You're welcome."

Renee takes Bree to a bar, encouraging her to live a little, and Bree ends up going skinny dipping with a man she has just met in the pool of his opulent house, before the true owner of the house, his boss, catches them when he comes home. Bree is soon going to bed with a succession of men which gets the Reverend concerned about her behavior. Determined to show he's wrong, Bree participates in a bake sale where she meets one of her lovers, only to discover he's married. When Karen McCluskey says that they do not know what Bree is really like, Bree decides to live up to her reputation as the new "town whore". Bree is soon bed hopping to the point that she hits on a man in a bar without remembering she had gone home with him just two nights previously. When they hear about Renee taking Bree to a bar, her friends try and stage an intervention, at which point Bree reaches her breaking point and blasts them for their less than friend-like behavior recently. At the bar, she's approached by a man and realizes how far she's fallen, ready to go home. The man follows her to the parking lot, threatening to assault Bree, only for them to be interrupted by a wheelchair-using Orson. He uses a taser to knock the man out, telling Bree her friends called him to help and if there's one thing they did well together, it was "cleaning up each other's messes". Orson soon convinces Bree that the girls are still angry at her and to go away with him for a weekend. What Bree doesn't know is that Orson has been stalking her for months, seeing the girls bury Alejandro's body, and he was the one leaving Bree the notes as part of his warped scheme to win her back. Bree soon discovers the truth while visiting Orson's apartment and despite his claims he did it all for her, she says she wants nothing to do with him. Orson calls her later, claiming that their love requires sacrifice, and Bree believes he's going to kill himself. Instead, Orson mails a folder of evidence against her to the police.

Bree is surprised when Andrew comes home, engaged to a woman named Mary Beth. Learning she's an heiress, Bree suspects Andrew is just marrying her for her money. Mary Beth tells Bree she knows Andrew is gay but is still willing to marry him as she's been unlucky in love. Bree convinces Mary Beth to find a man who truly loves her and she breaks up with Andrew. Andrew is upset at losing a chance at the money but Bree tells him he can stay with her and accept her help getting back on his feet.

Meanwhile, the police become suspicious of Bree and the murder of Gaby's stepfather and the help in its cover-up, so they tread carefully in trying to get proof that she is one of the suspects. They interview her, and she says that she had nothing to do with it. However, having been interrogated while drinking a cup of tea, her fingerprints are left on the mug. The fingerprint that the police found on the body and the fingerprint on Bree's cup match. The police go and talk to Ben, still about the murder of Alejandro. Ben keeps Bree's secret, and the police leave, with no more evidence than the fingerprint. But they do not stop there; a detective tracks down a call from Bree to Ben that night regarding Alejandro's murder, and they record it.

In order to defend herself, Bree asks Bob Hunter for legal advice, but he tells her she needs a criminal lawyer. He recommends lawyer Trip Weston, whom he calls a "shark". Bree goes to trial but does not tell Trip all the truth and is about to go to prison until Mrs. McCluskey confesses to the murder of Alejandro herself, after Bree and the girls agree to take care of her during her last days of life. Bree is acquitted of all charges. In the end, Bree marries Trip and moves to Louisville, Kentucky, where she joins a club for conservative women. Later, she is encouraged by Trip to run for the city council and the following November, she is elected to the Kentucky Legislature.

== Reception ==
=== Critical ===
Bree has received widespread acclaim, both for the character's storylines, and for Cross' portrayal. In a review of the pilot, Tim Goodman from the San Francisco Chronicle called Cross "almost too perfect as uptight Bree" and applauded her for "managing to give the character more shadings than merely insanely perfect".

At the commencement of the second season, Bree was widely considered the series' most prominent character, following the first year's emphasis on Susan Mayer. Though a drop in quality was noted in the second season, Bree's battles with alcohol, her teenage son, and her murderous pharmacist lover, while continuing to deal with the death of her husband, were well received and considered the focal point of the series in light of the lagging Applewhite mystery.

Cross retained her center-stage position for the show's third season, which widely focused upon the mystery surrounding her new husband Orson. Critics noted an improvement in quality from the second season to the third, and many deemed Bree's storyline to be the most satisfying of the season, as well as noting a "loss of steam" during Cross' maternity leave at the latter part of the season.

Season 4's "fake pregnancy" storyline continued to satisfy critics, with one calling it the series' most "hysterical [storyline] yet" and singling Cross out for praise. Her friction with Katherine Mayfair was also noted as a highlight. Following the five-year leap, a new direction was taken with Bree's character as she made the transition from housewife to author/businesswoman, a development which received positive reception.

This change in character development was continued into season 6, with another side to Bree's personality being shown, which includes an affair with Karl Mayer. Critics lauded the comic relief provided by these developments, as well as the more poignant and emotional turn mid-season as Bree deals with Orson's paralysis.

In Season 7, Bree finds herself newly divorced and embarks on a relationship with Keith Watson, a move which was praised for allowing "the for-so-long uptight Bree letting her hair down and having some fun for a change." By the climax of season 7, Bree is central in covering up the murder of Gabrielle's stepfather, a move which was praised as a sound set-up for the final season.

=== Awards ===
Marcia Cross has received widespread acclaim for her portrayal of Bree. For her work on the second season of the show, she garnered the Satellite Award for Best Actress - Television Series Musical or Comedy (her second nomination) and also received the Screen Actors Guild Award for Outstanding Performance by an Ensemble in a Comedy Series twice as part of the cast (being nominated a further three times).

In 2005, Cross was nominated for the Primetime Emmy Award for Outstanding Lead Actress in a Comedy Series for her performance in the season one episode, "Running to Stand Still". She also made the Top 10 Pre-Nomination Finalist listing for the same award three subsequent times, for her work on the second-season episode "Next", third-season episode "Listen to the Rain on the Roof", and fourth-season episode "Now You Know". She received three nominations at the Golden Globe Awards, for Best Actress in a Television Series - Musical or Comedy, for her work on the first three seasons of the show and also received three nominations at the Prism Awards (for Performance in a Comedy Series, in relation to Bree's alcoholism) and a nomination from the Television Critics Association for Individual Achievement in Comedy in 2005.

=== Cultural influences and impact ===
Bree is spoofed in MADtv's Desperate Housewives parody, in which they mock the character's plastic exterior and demeanor. In a 2006 interview with Charmed Magazine, Michelle Stafford admitted that her character Mandi in Charmed episode "Desperate Housewitches" was almost entirely modeled after Marcia Cross as Bree. Looking at pictures and episodes of Bree to gain a sense of her posture and body language, she laughed, "I'm just mimicking her. I'm just ripping her off."

In 2007, Madame Alexander released a line of 16-inch fashion dolls of the series' main characters, including Bree.
