= Terry Bozeman =

American actor

- Born: January 1, 1950 (age 76)
- Occupation: Actor

Terry Bozeman (born 1 January 1950) is an American actor.

== Career ==
He appears as Dr. Lee Craig on Desperate Housewives. He played Richard Armus on the thriller 24. He also plays lawyers for NCIS, CSI, and CSI: Miami. He is a 1977 graduate of The Goodman School of Drama in Chicago, Illinois. He also played the father of the Martin clan in the Christian values series, McGee and Me!. Bozeman also does commercial work.

== Filmography ==
Year	Title	Role	Notes
1989–95	McGee and Me!	David Martin	12 episodes
2000	Rules of Engagement	Juror #4	
2001–11	CSI: Crime Scene Investigation	Attorney Brad Lewis	15 episodes
2004	Envy	3M Worker	
2007	Charlie Wilson's War	CIA Award Presenter	
2012	The Amazing Spider-Man	Principal	
2021	Chicago Med	Francis Buckley	Episode: Be The Change You Want To See
