= Betty Applewhite =

Fictional character on Desperate Housewives

- Desperate Housewives character
- Alfre Woodard as Betty Applewhite
- Portrayed by: Alfre Woodard
- Duration: 2005–06
- First appearance: "Goodbye for Now"; 1x22, May 15, 2005
- Last appearance: "Remember (Part 2)"; 2x24, May 21, 2006
- Created by: Marc Cherry
In-universe information
- Occupation: Former concert pianist
- Husband: Virgil Applewhite (m. 1985; div. 2003)
- Sons: Matthew Applewhite (deceased); Caleb Applewhite

Betty Applewhite is a fictional character played by actress Alfre Woodard on the ABC television series Desperate Housewives. The character is introduced in the last episodes of the series' first season, and becomes the center of the mystery of the second season, along with her two sons, Matthew and Caleb.

== Development and casting ==
Regarding Betty Applewhite and the mystery storyline of her family, series creator Marc Cherry stated: "They come on the street; they seem like nice people — but they've got a secret. And it's pretty gothic. It's real and human and awful all at the same time." Woodard commented that her character "never means harm... Let's just say she has flaws. She had to make some really tough decisions quick and if the law ever catches up with her, she'll have to serve time... But they'll never catch her." The final scene of the season 2 premiere in which Betty and Matthew bring food to the prisoner in their basement was originally intended for the first season finale but saved for "Next" instead. While the Applewhites are regarded as the first major black characters on the series, Cherry stated that the role of Betty was originally offered to two white film actresses, both of whom turned it down due to financial and time commitment issues. He clarified: "There's nothing strategically black about her character. Her color is incidental." Woodard stated that she had never seen the show before accepting the role, something that led the producers to send her fifteen episodes of the show, which she divided amongst various family members. After they compared storylines, Woodard recalled that she became "instantly hooked" on the series.

== Storylines ==
Betty Applewhite is the first African-American housewife to be a major character on Desperate Housewives, and is described as a "deeply religious, overbearing single mother". Betty grew up in a very religious household, and is a gifted pianist. Betty married young to a man named Virgil Applewhite. Betty and Virgil had two sons named Matthew and Caleb Applewhite. Virgil started being abusive which led to Betty leaving him. She took Matthew and Caleb with her. Matthew lied to Bree and Danielle Van de Kamp saying that Virgil was dead when the Applewhites first meet the Van de Kamps.

Betty begins her recurring role in the final two episodes of the show's first season, when she buys a house on Wisteria Lane from Edie Britt over the phone and moves during the night. In the first episode of season 2, she agrees to be the organist at Rex Van de Kamp's funeral at the request of Bree Van de Kamp.

After she moves in, it is revealed she has locked her developmentally disabled son Caleb in her basement. Because of the secretive way she bought her house and moved in, she arouses the suspicions of the housewives. She eventually reveals to Bree that Caleb murdered Melanie Foster. It is shown that while living in Chicago, Matthew had an off and on relationship with Melanie. One night, he told her he wanted to end things permanently. Melanie wanted to make it a "real goodbye", so they decided to meet in a lumberyard. Caleb got there first and said that he could be her boyfriend and tried to kiss her. After Melanie laughed in his face and slapped him, he hit her and beat her unconscious. Believing he had killed her, he ran home covered in blood.

Meanwhile, her son Matthew has been dating Danielle Van de Kamp, Bree's daughter. Matthew wants a "normal life" without the secrets and pressures of keeping a fugitive out of sight. He and Danielle hatch a scheme to have Caleb put down. Matthew tricks his brother into going to Danielle's house to rape her. Bree finds out and informs Betty that she will call the cops to have Caleb arrested. Betty decides to poison Caleb, refusing to have him locked away. By poisoning him, she thinks she will give him peace.

Betty takes Caleb on a picnic where she treats him to a bowl of ice cream that she has poisoned. Caleb asks if Matthew is mad at him, and Betty asks why. He tells her the truth about what Matthew told him to do, and Betty stops Caleb from eating the ice cream.

Back on Wisteria Lane, she tricks Matthew into going into the basement, where she locks him in for punishment.

Danielle comes to Matthew's aid and strikes Betty with a crowbar. She and Matthew flee, leaving Betty on the basement floor. After she comes to, Betty decides to leave Wisteria Lane. She packs her belongings and prepares to depart with Caleb in the middle of the night. However, the police show up and arrest her before she can leave.

In jail, Betty looks at a crime scene photo of Melanie and sees Matthew's jacket. Matthew had gone to the lumberyard to find Melanie. When she threatens Matthew that she will tell the police what happened if he doesn't take her back, he kills her. Matthew had Caleb blamed. Betty calls Bree, who is in a psychiatric hospital, and warns her that Danielle is with Matthew, who was the real murderer. As Bree escapes the hospital, Matthew and Danielle head back to the neighborhood to grab some things. While Danielle attempts to break into her mother's safe, Matthew heads to the Applewhite home to pick up some cash. Betty is there to confront him and reveals that she has learned the shocking truth and is even more shocked that he has placed the blame on his brother.

According to Matthew, Betty loved Caleb more than she loved him. Betty argues that she was the only person Caleb was going to receive love from. Matthew leaves to get Danielle from her house before Betty alerts the authorities. As Matthew prepares to flee with Danielle, they are confronted by Bree. In the resulting confrontation, Matthew pulls a gun on Bree, and just as he is about to pull the trigger, he is shot dead by a police sniper. Betty decides that this dark chapter of her life is over. She packs and leaves Wisteria Lane with Caleb.

== Reception ==
As soon as Woodard accepted the role of Betty Applewhite, she reported experiencing heavy media attention. Woodard's portrayal of Betty was praised and resulted in a nomination for the Primetime Emmy Award for Outstanding Supporting Actress in a Comedy Series. However, her mystery as a whole had mixed reviews. In a review of the second-season premiere, Michael Slezak of Entertainment Weekly thought that the Applewhite mystery would help reduce the show's chances of falling into a sophomore slump. He praised Woodard's acting as well as her character's storyline, opining, "there's something so inherently warm and maternal in Woodard's performance, such apple-pie wholesomeness, that it makes her touches of menace all the more chilling." However, as the season progressed, there were many complaints about Betty's lack of interaction with the other housewives. While reviewing the Extra Juicy Edition of the DVD of the second season, Kristopowitz noted that many of the bad reviews received by the second season were because of Betty.

Even several seasons after Betty's departure, her mystery was a target of negative reviews and comparisons. In his review of the fourth season premiere, Matt Roush of TV Guide complimented the addition of Katherine Mayfair (Dana Delany), writing "while she's obviously harboring a dark secret, at least there's no one trapped in the basement." While reviewing the third episode of the fifth season, Tanner Stransky of Entertainment Weekly hoped that, after finding the truth behind the mystery of Dave Williams (Neal McDonough), the audience would not feel "Applewhited", commenting that "After episodes of buildup and rattling chains coming from her basement, the story line was such a disappointment." Four episodes into the sixth season, Ken Tucker of Entertainment Weekly declared that the mystery storyline of Angie Bolen (Drea de Matteo) was suffering from the lack of interaction between the character and the other leading women, similar to Betty's storyline in season two. When Vanessa Williams was cast as Renee Perry, who became the second African-American housewife to be a major character on the series, she criticized the storyline to Entertainment Weekly, "[Betty] had her son in chains in the basement. It was like, 'Really? Do we have to go there with our first Black character?' I honestly fell off the show after that. I think it was just so implausible and just an image that Black folks don't want to see: their child chained and shackled in the basement."
