= Larry Shaw (director) =

American film director

- Born: United States
- Occupations: Film director, film producer, television director, television producer
- Years active: 1985–present

Larry Shaw is an American film director, television director and film and television producer.

As a television director, some of his credits include Desperate Housewives, 21 Jump Street, Star Trek: The Next Generation, The X-Files, Parker Lewis Can't Lose, Lizzie McGuire and Defiance.

As a producer, he worked on Desperate Housewives, as well as directing and producing for Stingray and was an associate producer on Hunter which ran from 1984 to 1991.

Shaw has also directed a number of television films, most notably Cadet Kelly (2002) starring Hilary Duff, who he previously worked with on Lizzie McGuire.

Shaw's latest projects, as of 2016, includes Freeform's Guilt.
