= List of Desperate Housewives cast members =

This is a list of recurring actors on the American television show Desperate Housewives. Every actor credited in two episodes or more is included in the article.

== Main cast ==
Characters are listed in the order they were first credited in the series.

=== Starring ===
Actor	Character	Season							
Actor	Character	S1	S2	S3	S4	S5	S6	S7	S8
Teri Hatcher	Susan Mayer	Starring	Starring	Starring	Starring	Starring	Starring	Starring	Starring
Felicity Huffman	Lynette Scavo	Starring	Starring	Starring	Starring	Starring	Starring	Starring	Starring
Marcia Cross	Bree Van de Kamp	Starring	Starring	Starring	Starring	Starring	Starring	Starring	Starring
Eva Longoria	Gabrielle Solis	Starring	Starring	Starring	Starring	Starring	Starring	Starring	Starring
Nicollette Sheridan	Edie Britt	Starring	Starring	Starring	Starring	Starring			
James Denton	Mike Delfino	Starring	Starring	Starring	Starring	Starring	Starring	Starring	Starring
Steven Culp	Rex Van de Kamp	Starring	Guest	Guest		Guest		Guest	Guest
Ricardo Chavira	Carlos Solis	Starring	Starring	Starring	Starring	Starring	Starring	Starring	Starring
Mark Moses	Paul Young	Starring	Starring	Recurring			Guest	Starring	Guest
Brenda Strong	Mary Alice Young	Starring	Starring	Starring	Starring	Starring	Starring	Starring	Starring
Andrea Bowen ^{1}	Julie Mayer	Starring	Starring	Starring	Starring	Guest	Also starring	Guest	Recurring
Jesse Metcalfe	John Rowland	Starring	Guest	Guest	Guest		Recurring		
Cody Kasch	Zach Young	Starring	Starring	Recurring				Guest	
Alfre Woodard	Betty Applewhite	Guest	Starring						
Doug Savant	Tom Scavo	Recurring	Starring	Starring	Starring	Starring	Starring	Starring	Starring
Richard Burgi	Karl Mayer	Recurring	Starring	Guest	Guest	Recurring	Recurring		Guest
Kyle MacLachlan	Orson Hodge		Recurring	Starring	Starring	Starring	Starring	Guest	Recurring
Dana Delany	Katherine Mayfair				Starring	Starring	Starring		Guest
Neal McDonough	Dave Williams					Starring			
Shawn Pyfrom	Andrew Van de Kamp	Recurring	Also starring	Also starring	Also starring	Starring	Recurring	Recurring	Guest
Drea de Matteo	Angie Bolen						Starring		
Maiara Walsh	Ana Solis					Guest	Starring		
Kathryn Joosten ^{1} ^{2} ^{3}	Karen McCluskey	Guest	Recurring	Recurring	Recurring	Recurring	Also starring	Starring	Also starring
Vanessa Williams	Renee Perry							Starring	Starring
Kevin Rahm ^{3}	Lee McDermott				Recurring	Recurring	Recurring	Starring	Also starring
Tuc Watkins ^{3}	Bob Hunter				Recurring	Recurring	Recurring	Starring	Also starring
Jonathan Cake	Chuck Vance							Recurring	Starring
Charles Mesure	Ben Faulkner								Starring
Madison De La Garza ^{3}	Juanita Solis				Guest	Recurring	Also starring	Also starring	Starring

=== Supporting ===
Actor	Character	Season							
Actor	Character	S1	S2	S3	S4	S5	S6	S7	S8
Joy Lauren ^{4}	Danielle Van de Kamp Katz	Recurring	Also starring	Also starring	Also starring	Guest	Guest	Guest	Guest
Mehcad Brooks	Matthew Applewhite	Guest	Also starring						
Brent Kinsman	Preston Scavo	Recurring	Also starring	Also starring	Also starring				
Max Carver	Preston Scavo					Also starring	Recurring	Recurring	Recurring
Shane Kinsman	Porter Scavo	Recurring	Also starring	Also starring	Also starring				
Charlie Carver ^{3}	Porter Scavo					Also starring	Also starring	Also starring	Also starring
Zane Huett	Parker Scavo	Recurring	Also starring	Also starring	Also starring				
Joshua Logan Moore ^{3}	Parker Scavo					Also starring	Also starring	Also starring	Also starring
Roger Bart ^{5}	George Williams	Recurring	Also starring						
Harriet Sansom Harris	Felicia Tilman	Recurring	Recurring					Recurring	Guest
Page Kennedy ^{6}	Caleb Applewhite		Also starring						
NaShawn Kearse ^{7}	Caleb Applewhite		Also starring						
Josh Henderson ^{8}	Austin McCann			Also starring					
Lyndsy Fonseca	Dylan Mayfair				Also starring		Guest		
Rachel Fox ^{4}	Kayla Scavo			Recurring	Also starring				
Kendall Applegate	Penny Scavo					Also starring	Also starring		
Darcy Rose Byrnes ^{3}	Penny Scavo							Also starring	Also starring
Jeffrey Nordling ^{9}	Nick Bolen						Also starring		
Beau Mirchoff ^{1}	Danny Bolen						Also starring		
Mason Vale Cotton ^{3}	M.J. Delfino					Recurring	Also starring	Also starring	Also starring

- ^1 In season 6, Andrea Bowen, Kathryn Joosten and Beau Mirchoff were only credited in the episodes they appear in.
- ^2 Kathryn Joosten was credited as "Also Starring" in season 6, except for episode 6×23 in which she was credited as "Starring".
- ^3 In season 7, Kathryn Joosten, Kevin Rahm, Tuc Watkins, Charlie Carver, Joshua Logan Moore, Darcy Rose Byrnes, Madison De La Garza and Mason Vale Cotton were only credited in the episodes they appear in, although De La Garza was credited in episode 7×05 in which she did not appear.
- ^4 Joy Lauren and Rachel Fox were not credited in episode 4×01.
- ^5 Roger Bart was credited as "Also Starring" from episode 2×02 to 2×09 and as a "Special Guest Star" in episode 2×24.
- ^6 Page Kennedey was credited as "Also Starring" in episodes 2×03, 2×05, 2×06 and 2×07, before being replaced by NaShawn Kearse.
- ^7 NaShawn Kearse was credited as "Also Starring" from episode 2×08 to 2×24, replacing Page Kennedey. However, he was credited as Nashawn Kearse in episodes 2×08, 2×09 and 2×10.
- ^8 Josh Henderson was credited as "Also Starring" from episode 3×01 to 3×16.
- ^9 Jeffrey Nordling was not credited in episode 6×06.

== Guest cast ==
=== A ===
- Ian Abercrombie – Rupert Cavanaugh (1 episode, season 3)
- Isabella Acres – Jenny Hunter-McDermott (3 episodes, seasons 7–8)
- Jillian Armenante – Rachel (2 episodes, season 8)
- Rochelle Aytes – Amber James (3 episodes, season 7)
- Anthony Azizi – Robert Falati (2 episodes, season 3)

=== B ===
- Charlie Babcock – Stu Durber (6 episodes, seasons 2 and 5)
- Scott Bakula – Trip Weston (5 episodes, season 8)
- Cecilia Balagot – Grace Sanchez (4 episodes, season 7)
- Daniella Baltodano – Celia Solis (50 episodes, seasons 4–8)
- John Barrowman – Patrick Logan (6 episodes, season 6)
- Justine Bateman – Ellie Leonard (5 episodes, seasons 4 and 8)
- Joy Bisco – Melanie Foster (1 episode, season 2)
- Orson Bean – Roy Bender (23 episodes, seasons 6–8)
- Polly Bergen – Stella Wingfield (10 episodes, seasons 3–5, and 7)
- Emily Bergl – Beth Young (14 episodes, seasons 7–8)
- Julie Benz – Robin Gallagher (6 episodes, season 6)
- Daniela Bobadilla – Marisa Sanchez (2 episodes, season 8)
- John Bobek – Tucker (2 episodes, season 3)
- Michael Bofshever – Kenny Stevens (2 episodes, season 3)
- Lesley Boone – Lucy Blackburn (2 episodes, season 5)
- Terry Bozeman – Dr. Lee Craig (6 episodes, seasons 1–3)
- Jill Brennan – Tish Atherton (5 episodes, seasons 1–3)
- Pat Crawford Brown – Ida Greenberg (24 episodes, seasons 1–4)

=== C ===
- Marie Caldare – Lila Dash (4 episodes, season 5)
- Scott Allan Campbell – Detective Sloan (2 episodes, season 2)
- Ridge Canipe – Danny Farrell (2 episodes, seasons 2–3)
- Chris Carmack – Tim Bremmer (1 episode, season 4)
- Ryan Carnes – Justin (11 episodes, seasons 1–2)
- Dixie Carter – Gloria Hodge (7 episodes, season 3)
- Christina Chang – D.A. Emily Stone (3 episodes, season 8)
- Maree Cheatham – Ceal (1 episode, season 2)
- Jake Cherry – Travers McLain (5 episodes, season 3)
- Nick Chinlund – Detective Sullivan (5 episodes, seasons 1–2)
- Emily Christine – Ashley Bukowski (2 episodes, season 1)
- Christine Clayburg – Reporter (6 episodes, seasons 3, 6 and 8)
- Gary Cole – Wayne Davis (6 episodes, season 4)
- Maria Cominis – Mona Clarke (11 episodes, seasons 1–3, 5–6 and 8)
- Frances Conroy – Virginia Hildebrand (3 episodes, season 5)
- Brett Cullen – Detective Burnett (2 episodes, season 1)

=== D ===
- Gregg Daniel – Dr. Sicher (2 episodes, season 1)
- Mark Deklin – Bill Pearce (2 episodes, season 3)
- Michael Dempsey – Detective Murphy (8 episodes, seasons 6–8)
- Reed Diamond – Gregg Limon (2 episodes, season 8)
- Paul Dooley – Addison Prudy (3 episodes, season 2)
- Jeff Doucette – Father Crowley (10 episodes, seasons 1–6)
- Nike Doukas – Natalie Klein (3 episodes, seasons 1 and 8)
- Shawn Doyle – Mr. Hartley (2 episodes, season 1)
- Jennifer Dundas – Rebecca Shepherd (2 episodes, season 3)
- Michael Durrell – Myron Katzburg (3 episodes, season 3)

=== E ===
- Edward Edwards – Dan Peterson (2 episodes, season 1)
- Jayne Entwistle – Marilyn (3 episodes, season 8)
- Christine Estabrook – Martha Huber (10 episodes, seasons 1, 5, 7–8)

=== F ===
- Patrick Fabian – Frank (2 episodes, season 8)
- Stephanie Faracy – Miss Charlotte (2 episodes, season 7)
- Mike Farrell – Milton Lang (3 episodes, seasons 3–4)
- Miguel Ferrer – Andre Zeller (5 episodes, season 8)
- Nathan Fillion – Adam Mayfair (12 episodes, season 4)
- Joely Fisher – Nina Fletcher (5 episodes, season 2)
- Stephen Ford – Travers McLain (1 episode, season 5)
- Kurt Fuller – Detective Barton (5 episodes, season 2)

=== G ===
- Albert Garcia – Luis (2 episodes, season 2)
- Jason Gedrick – Rick Coletti (6 episodes, seasons 3–4)
- Ellen Geer – Lillian Simms (4 episodes, seasons 3–4 and 8)
- Mary Pat Gleason – Elenora Butters (2 episodes, seasons 1 and 5)
- Juliette Goglia – Amy Pearce (2 episodes, season 3)
- Currie Graham – Ed Ferrara (9 episodes, seasons 2–3)
- Brian Austin Green – Keith Watson (15 episodes, season 7)
- Melissa Greenspan – Cindy (4 episodes, seasons 7–8)
- Todd Grinnell – Alex Cominis (6 episodes, seasons 5 and 7)
- Bob Gunton – Noah Taylor (10 episodes, seasons 1–2)

=== H ===
- Armie Hammer – Barrett (1 episode, season 4)
- Larry Hagman – Frank Kaminsky (2 episodes, season 7)
- Melinda Page Hamilton – Sister Mary Bernard (3 episodes, season 2)
- Jay Harrington – Dr. Ron McCready (7 episodes, season 2)
- Rachael Harris – Sandra Birch (1 episode, season 4)
- Harriet Sansom Harris – Felicia Tilman (28 episodes, seasons 1–2 and 7)
- Gale Harold – Jackson Braddock (14 episodes, seasons 4–5)
- Kathryn Harrold – Helen Rowland (3 episodes, seasons 1–2)
- Megan Hilty – Shayla Grove (2 episodes, season 5)
- Nichole Hiltz – Libby Collins (3 episodes, season 2)
- Michael Hitchcock – Mr. Doyle (1 episode, season 2)
- Ernie Hudson – Detective Ridley (7 episodes, season 3)

=== I ===
- Michael Ironside – Curtis "Curt" Monroe (2 episodes, season 2)
- Gregory Itzin – Dick Barrows (2 episodes, season 7)

=== J ===
- Bruce Jarchow – Sam Bormanis (4 episodes, season 2)
- Peter Jason – Jeff (2 episodes, season 3)
- Jolie Jenkins – Deirdre Taylor (2 episodes, season 1)
- Carla Jimenez – Carmen Sanchez (4 episodes, season 7)
- Leslie Jordan – Felix Bergman (2 episodes, season 8)

=== K ===
- John Kapelos – Eugene Beale (4 episodes, season 2)
- Lainie Kazan – Maxine Rosen (5 episodes, season 7)
- Dagney Kerr – Ruth Ann Heisel (3 episodes, seasons 1–2)
- Brian Kerwin – Harvey Bigsby (2 episodes, season 3)
- Heidi Klum – Herself (1 episode, season 6)
- Shirley Knight – Phyllis Van de Kamp (5 episodes, seasons 2 and 4)

=== L ===
- John Lacy – Detective Beckerman (2 episodes, season 1)
- Sal Landi – Donny the Loan Shark (5 episodes, season 8)
- Sharon Lawrence – Maisy Gibbons (3 episodes, season 1)
- Scotty Leavenworth – Kirby Schilling (2 episodes, season 5)
- Gloria LeRoy – Rose Kemper (2 episodes, season 5)
- Mary Margaret Lewis – Renee (2 episodes, season 3)
- Ruby Lewis – Chloe Carlson (2 episodes, season 8)
- Beth Littleford – Dana (2 episodes, seasons 7–8)
- Sam Lloyd – Dr. Albert Goldfine (8 episodes, seasons 1–2)
- Wayne Lopez – Clyde (3 episodes, seasons 3) and Air Marshal (1 episode, season 2)
- Aaron Lustig – Craig Lynwood (3 episodes, season 7)
- Jennifer Lyons – Cecile (2 episodes, season 2)
- Jane Lynch – Maxine Bennett (1 episode, season 2)

=== M ===
- Justina Machado – Claudia Sanchez (2 episodes, season 8)
- Tanner Maguire – Zach Young, age 4 (4 episodes, seasons 1–2)
- Marlee Matlin – Alisa Stevens (1 episode, season 1)
- Valerie Mahaffey – Alma Hodge (8 episodes, seasons 3 and 8)
- Carol Mansell – Pat Ziegler (4 episodes, season 2)
- Alec Mapa – Vern (5 episodes, seasons 2–3)
- John Mariano – Oliver Weston (2 episodes, season 2)
- Dakin Matthews – Reverend Sykes (7 episodes, seasons 1–4, 6–8)
- Helena Mattsson – Irina Korsakov (3 episodes, season 6)
- Billy Mayo – Detective Lyons (5 episodes, seasons 4–5)
- James Luca McBride – Al Kaminsky (3 episodes, season 4) and Cop at Applewhite's (1 episode, season 2)
- Eddie McClintock – Frank Helm (3 episodes, season 2)
- Michael McDonald – Steven (1 episode, season 2)
- Melinda McGraw – Annabel Foster (3 episodes, season 1)
- Laurie Metcalf – Carolyn Bigsby (4 episodes, season 3)
- Penelope Ann Miller – Fran Ferrara (1 episode, season 2)
- Rolando Molina – Hector Sanchez (3 episodes, season 7)
- Tim Monsion – Dr. Cunningham (2 episodes, season 2)
- Felice Heather Monteith – Nurse Marcy (2 episodes, season 3)
- Chloë Grace Moretz – Sheri Maltby (2 episodes, season 3)
- Betty Murphy – Alberta Fromme (5 episodes, seasons 1–3)
- Harry S. Murphy – Mr. Lentz (3 episodes, seasons 1–2)

=== N ===
- Bob Newhart – Morty Flickman (3 episodes, seasons 1–2)
- John Haymes Newton – Jonathan Lithgow (2 episodes, season 1)
- Daran Norris – Phil (1 episode, season 8)

=== O ===
- Conor O'Farrell – Detective Copeland (3 episodes, season 1)
- Gail O'Grady – Anne Schilling (4 episodes, season 5)
- Shannon O'Hurley – Mrs. Truesdale (2 episodes, seasons 1–2)
- Peter Onorati – Warren Schilling (2 episodes, season 5)
- Lupe Ontiveros – Juanita "Mama" Solis (8 episodes, seasons 1 and 8)
- Ion Overman – Maria Scott (3 episodes, season 5)

=== P ===
- Sam Page – Sam Allen (7 episodes, season 6)
- Dougald Park – Xiao-Mei's doctor (3 episodes, seasons 2–3)
- Andrea Parker – Jane Carlson (11 episodes, season 8)
- Adrian Pasdar – David Bradley (3 episodes, season 2)
- Alejandro Patino – Ralph (5 episodes, season 2)
- Sarah Paulson – Lydia Lindquist (2 episodes, seasons 4 and 8)
- Tony Plana – Alejandro Perez (5 episodes, seasons 7–8)

=== Q ===
- Ed Quinn – Brent Ferguson (1 episode, season 7)

=== R ===
- Alyson Reed – Judge Conti (3 episodes, season 8)
- Matt Roth – Art Shepherd (4 episodes, season 3)
- Richard Roundtree – Jerry Shaw (5 episodes, season 1)
- Jeremy Rowley – Nurse Erik (2 episodes, season 8)
- John Rubinstein – Principal Hobson (7 episodes, seasons 5–8)

=== S ===
- John Schneider – Richard Watson (4 episodes, season 7)
- Dougray Scott – Ian Hainsworth (18 episodes, season 3)
- Sayeed Shahidi – Charlie James (3 episodes, season 7)
- James Shanklin – Detective Morgan (2 episodes, season 2)
- Mitch Silpa – Jerry (3 episodes, seasons 2–3)
- John Slattery – Victor Lang (14 episodes, seasons 3–4)
- Lois Smith – Allison Scavo (2 episodes, season 7)
- Marla Sokoloff – Claire (3 episodes, season 1)
- Jake Soldera – Benjamin Katz (3 episodes, seasons 5, 7–8)
- Lucille Soong – Yao Lin (7 episodes, seasons 1 and 5)
- Kylie Sparks – Kim (3 episodes, season 3)
- Stephen Spinella – Dr. Samuel Heller (4 episodes, season 5)
- David Starzyk – Bradley Scott (5 episodes, seasons 5 and 8)
- Heather Stephens – Kendra Taylor (2 episodes, season 1)
- Mindy Sterling – Mitzi Kinsky (6 episodes, seasons 6–7)
- Lindsey Stoddart – Melissa (2 episodes, season 8)
- Elizabeth Storm – Janie Peterson (2 episodes, season 1)
- Jeffrey Stubblefield – Jerome (2 episodes, season 3)
- Kevin Symons – Jack Pinkham (3 episodes, seasons 6–7)

=== T ===
- Mark L. Taylor – Mr. Steinberg (2 episodes, season 1)
- Lee Tergesen – Peter McMillan (5 episodes, season 2)
- Lily Tomlin – Roberta Simmons (6 episodes, season 5)
- Nancy Travis – Mary Wagner (2 episodes, season 7)
- Stacey Travis – Jordana Geist (3 episodes, seasons 1 and 3)
- Steve Tyler – Minister (5 episodes, seasons 3, 5–6 and 8)

=== U ===
- Billy Unger – Chad / Jeremy McMullin (2 episodes, season 3)

=== V ===
- Joyce Van Patten – Carol Prudy (2 episodes, season 2)

=== W ===
- Dale Waddington Horowitz – Nurse Voorhees (6 episodes, seasons 2–3 and 6–7)
- Aria Wallace – Lily Stevens (1 episode, season 1)
- Melora Walters – Sylvia Greene (3 episodes, season 4)
- Kiersten Warren – Nora Huntington (9 episodes, seasons 2–3 and 8)
- Lesley Ann Warren – Sophie Bremmer (6 episodes, seasons 1–2, 7)
- Mae Whitman – Sarah (1 episode, season 3)
- Cheyenne Wilbur – Edwin Mullins (3 episodes, season 1)
- Matt Winston – Lazaro (2 episodes, season 8)
- Wendy Worthington – Nurse Parker (2 episodes, season 3)
- Becky Wu – Amy Yamada (4 episodes, season 8)

=== Y ===
- Gwendoline Yeo – Xiao-Mei (9 episodes, seasons 2–3)
- Kathleen York – Monique Polier (3 episodes, season 3)

=== Z ===
- Josh Zuckerman – Eddie Orlofsky – (11 episodes, season 6)
- José Zúñiga – Detective Heredia (3 episodes, season 8)
