= You're Gonna Love Tomorrow =

- Desperate Housewives episode
- Edie (Nicollette Sheridan) celebrates her homecoming with her new husband, Dave (Neal McDonough), at a neighborhood party. "You're Gonna Love Tomorrow" marks Dave's first appearance in the series.
- Episode no.: Season 5 Episode 1
- Directed by: Larry Shaw
- Written by: Marc Cherry
- Production code: 501
- Original air date: September 28, 2008
- Running time: 43 minutes

Guest appearances
- Joy Lauren as Danielle Katz; Kathryn Joosten as Karen McCluskey; Gale Harold as Jackson Braddock; Kevin Rahm as Lee McDermott; Tuc Watkins as Bob Hunter; Stephen Spinella as Dr. Samuel Heller; Hank Stratton as Keith Kavendish; Brent Kinsman as Preston Scavo (younger); Shane Kinsman as Porter Scavo (younger); Thomas Kopache as Raymond; Christopher Shea as Photographer; Madison De La Garza as Juanita Solis; Mason Vale Cotton as M.J. Delfino; Daniella Baltodano as Celia Solis; Marie Caldare as Lila Dash; Kelly Hawthorne as Saleswoman; Julie Wittner as Mother #1; Tami-Adrian George as Mother #2

Episode chronology
← Previous "Free"	Next → "We're So Happy You're So Happy"
- Desperate Housewives season 5

"You're Gonna Love Tomorrow" is the fifth season premiere episode of the American comedy-drama series Desperate Housewives, and the 88th episode overall. It originally aired on September 28, 2008, in the United States on ABC (American Broadcasting Company). The episode was written by series creator Marc Cherry and directed by Larry Shaw. "You're Gonna Love Tomorrow", as well as all subsequent episodes, takes place five years after the events of the fourth season finale following Cherry's decision to revamp the series with a time jump.

In the episode, Edie (Nicollette Sheridan) returns to Wisteria Lane after a five-year absence with her new husband, Dave (Neal McDonough). While Susan (Teri Hatcher) hesitates to make a romantic commitment to Jackson (Gale Harold), Lynette (Felicity Huffman) struggles with her defiant teenage children and her husband's midlife crisis. Gabrielle (Eva Longoria) deals with her daughters' weight problems and Bree (Marcia Cross) faces the ramifications of her success.

"You're Gonna Love Tomorrow" received mostly positive reviews from television critics, most of whom agreed that the time jump refreshed the show. According to Nielsen ratings, the episode drew over 18 million viewers, making it the most-watched show of the night and the second most-watched program of the week across all networks.

== Plot ==
=== Background ===
Desperate Housewives focuses on the lives of several residents living on Wisteria Lane. In recent episodes, Susan (Teri Hatcher) and Mike Delfino (James Denton) celebrate the birth of their son. Bree Hodge (Marcia Cross) chooses to raise her grandson while her daughter, Danielle (Joy Lauren), attends college. She also issues an ultimatum, telling her husband, Orson (Kyle MacLachlan), that she will leave him if he does not turn himself into the police after committing a hit-and-run. Gabrielle Solis (Eva Longoria) struggles with Carlos' (Ricardo Antonio Chavira) permanent blindness. Also, Edie Britt (Nicollette Sheridan) leaves Wisteria Lane after the other residents shun her for her malice.

=== Episode ===
"You're Gonna Love Tomorrow" takes place five years after the aforementioned events. Important plot information that takes place during the time jump is revealed in flashbacks. Orson has completed his prison sentence and the success of Bree's catering company has provided her the opportunity to write her own cookbook. Her business partner, Katherine Mayfair (Dana Delany), resents how Bree's success has changed her and intentionally sabotages Bree's television interview, further straining their friendship. A flashback reveals that Danielle married a lawyer and coldly took her son away from Bree. Meanwhile, Lynette is frustrated with Tom's (Doug Savant) relaxed approach to parenting their rebellious teenage sons, Porter and Preston (Charlie Carver and Max Carver, respectively). She encourages him to employ more disciplinary actions.

During the time jump, Susan and Mike were involved in a car crash that killed a mother and her child. As a result, the couple divorced and now share custody of their son, M.J. (Mason Vale Cotton). Susan engages in a sexual relationship with her house painter, Jackson Braddock (Gale Harold), but keeps their romance a secret from her friends and family. Jackson seeks a more substantial relationship, but Susan is wary of such a commitment following her divorce. Elsewhere, Gabrielle has been raising two overweight daughters, Juanita (Madison De La Garza) and Celia (Daniella Baltodano), and has also lost her own figure as well. Gabrielle tricks Juanita into exercising by driving away and making Juanita chase after her car.

After five years of absence, Edie returns to Wisteria Lane with her mysterious husband, Dave (Neal McDonough), who seems to have a calming effect on his ill-tempered wife. Later, Dave receives a phone call from Dr. Samuel Heller (Stephen Spinella), who reminds him that monthly check-ins are a condition of his release. After the conversation, Dr. Heller reviews a taped therapy session in which Dave threatens to get revenge on the man who destroyed his life.

== Production ==
"You're Gonna Love Tomorrow" was written by series creator and executive producer Marc Cherry and directed by Larry Shaw. Filming for the episode was scheduled to begin on July 7, 2008. The episode is the first to fully employ the five-year jump, which was introduced in the final two minutes of the fourth season finale. While developing the fifth season, Cherry began brainstorming ways to revamp the series. He stated: "The soap tends to build up, and I wanted to get back to where we were that very first season, where it's just the problems of some ordinary women and they were small and relatable." Cherry credits the producers of Lost for the idea of the time jump. The writers hoped the time jump would also help them avoid repeating mistakes they made during the show's poorly received second season, during which they relied heavily on storylines from the previous season. Cherry said that the time jump would be permanent, with executive producer Bob Daily clarifying that some brief flashback scenes would be used to enhance the storytelling and provide context for current plot lines. Cherry had originally wanted to do a ten-year jump, mostly to age the young characters into their teenage years in order to open up more storyline possibilities.

The writers ensured that although they were changing the storyline circumstances, the characters remained the same with minimal changes to their personalities. According to series writer Matt Berry, the time jump allowed the writers to work with the characters "without most of the baggage they'd accumulated in the earlier years, and put them into starting places so we could move them forward and build in new story arcs." For this reason, the writers treated the season premiere as a pilot, in which, according to Daily, they "could give the women a new drive." Daily identified the Susan character as having undergone the greatest change, stating that she has given up on looking for a "fairy-tale romance" and is emotionally distant in her new relationship. He also stated that the character of Gabrielle has dealt with the biggest change in terms of her circumstances, as she continues to deal with her husband's blindness and their financial problems. Actress Eva Longoria had to gain weight and wear additional body padding for her character's new storyline. Dana Delany stated that her character, Katherine, who was portrayed as an antiheroine in the previous season, is more relaxed following the time jump. However, Delany clarified that while Katherine is now friends with the other characters, she and Bree would become frenemies as a result of their business partnership. Nicollette Sheridan, commented that Edie, who played an integral role in the season's mystery story arch, is "a lot more conscientious about things [this season], without losing her comedic edge."

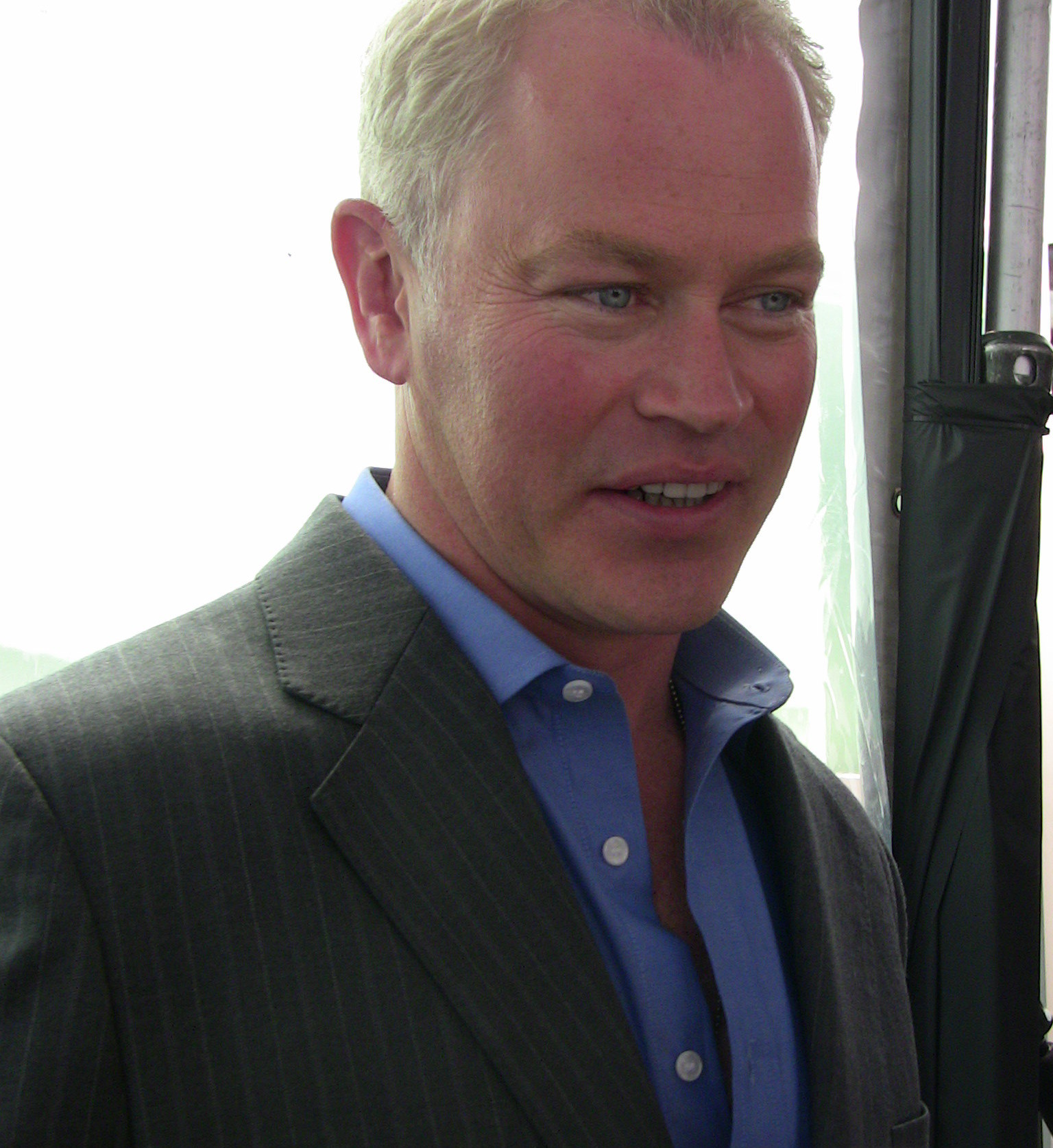
Neal McDonough made his debut appearance in this episode as Dave Williams, Edie Britt's mysterious third husband.

Several casting changes were made as a result of the five-year jump. Neal McDonough's involvement was announced in July 2008. McDonough did not audition for the role of Dave Williams, but was offered it after meeting with Cherry. Gale Harold continued appearing as Jackson, Susan's new love interest, after appearing briefly in the flashforward segment at the end of the fourth season. The roles of the Scavo children were recast in order to reflect their new ages following the time jump. Charlie and Max Carver replaced Brent and Shane Kinsman as Preston and Porter, respectively. The Kinsman twins appeared in a flashback in this episode. Joshua Logan Moore was cast as Parker, a role previously played by Zane Huett, and Kendall Applegate joined the cast as Penny, who had previously been portrayed by several toddler actresses. Despite their casting announcements alongside the Carver twins, Moore and Applegate did not appear in "You're Gonna Love Tomorrow". The flashforward segment at the end of the fourth season also introduced Kaila Say and Daniella Baltodano as Gabrielle's daughters, Juanita and Celia, respectively. Only Baltodano continued portraying her role for the fifth season; Say was replaced by Madison De La Garza during the summer hiatus.

Andrea Bowen, who starred as Susan's daughter, Julie, departed from the cast, as her character left for college at the end of the fourth season. Teri Hatcher expressed disappointment in the producers' decision, but Cherry stated that Bowen would return in the future. Joy Lauren, who portrayed Bree's daughter, Danielle, and Lyndsy Fonseca, who played Katherine's daughter, Dylan, also left the main cast, although the former appeared in the season premiere as a guest star. Because the fourth season ended leaving Mike's whereabouts unknown, James Denton's return to the series was questioned during hiatus. Denton stated in May 2008 that producers would not make a decision on his character until mid-June and that he was preparing to find work in case his contract was terminated. It was later confirmed that he would return to the series.

The Wisteria Lane set, which is located on the Colonial Street backlot set at Universal Studios, underwent changes for the time jump. Production designer P. Erik Carlson explained, "[former production designer Thomas A. Walsh] had already created a fairly Utopian world, and we wanted to exaggerate and enhance it a little bit more, mostly through the use of color. We didn't want it to feel ridiculously futuristic or viewers would be jarred by the contrast." Bree's garage was remodeled into a testing kitchen as result of the character's catering business. Additionally, all houses were repainted with bolder colors, with the exception of Gabrielle's home, in order to reflect the Solis' financial situation.

== Reception ==
=== Ratings ===
According to Nielsen ratings, "You're Gonna Love Tomorrow" was watched by 18.684 million viewers and held an 11.4 rating/17 share on its original American broadcast on September 28, 2008. The episode was watched in 13.105 million total households. It was number one in its timeslot, beating Sunday Night Football on NBC, Cold Case on CBS, and Family Guy and American Dad! on Fox. The episode was the most-watched program of the night in both total viewers and the young adult demographic. It was the second-most watched program of the week across all networks by viewers 18 to 49 years old, behind Grey's Anatomy, and the second-most watched program in total viewership, behind Dancing with the Stars. The episode also performed better than any original broadcast of the series since January 2008. It outperformed the fourth season finale by two million total viewers and showed a 17 percent increase in viewers 18 to 49 years old. At the time, the episode was the least-watched season premiere of the series, falling half a million viewers from the fourth season premiere, "Now You Know", a year earlier. However, "You're Gonna Love Tomorrow" outperformed "Now You Know" in the demographic of women between 18 and 34 years of age with an 8.3 rating/20 share in that demographic. In the United Kingdom, the episode premiered on Channel 4 on October 22, 2008. It was watched by 2.39 million viewers, becoming the sixth most-watched program of the week on the channel.

=== Critical reception ===
Cherry hasn't dramatically altered the show's fundamentals, which still whip up soapy elements with considerable humor, while repeatedly testing the friendships among his leads. Indeed, some issues that have characterized the series in the past have simply shifted from one character to another, which will probably do more to recharge the jets of his large (and by all accounts, demanding) cast than to galvanize viewers.

— Brian Lowry, Variety

The episode received mostly positive reviews from critics. Tanner Stransky of Entertainment Weekly called the five-year jump "a stroke of genius, effectively increasing our insight into these ladies' world by twofold." He called the Gabrielle storyline a true depiction of motherhood and applauded the scene in which Carlos and Gabrielle discuss her low self-esteem. He complimented the Bree storyline, particularly the argument scene between Bree and Katherine. He enjoyed the Dave storyline, but expressed disappointment that Edie's reappearance was the only scene that involved all of the leading women. Additionally, Stransky was not intrigued by Lynette's storyline and deemed it "more of the same" for the character. He criticized Susan's storyline, calling it annoying. He also dismissed the writers' ploy to give viewers the impression that Mike had died for almost the entire episode. TV Guide's Matt Roush gave the episode an 'A', stating, "Moving the story ahead five years didn't so much reinvent the show as it recharged and refreshed the scintillating mix of domestic comedy and sudsy intrigue that we've always enjoyed." He highlighted the comedic Gabrielle storyline while approving the additions of McDonough and Harold to the cast.

In his review of the first two episodes of the season, Brian Lowry of Variety said that while "You're Gonna Love Tomorrow" is satisfactory and establishes the five-year jump effectively, the second episode is better, calling it "a knock-out." Entertainment Weekly's Ken Tucker commended the time jump as a reflection of both the characters' and series' ambitions, rating the episode a 'B+'. Joanna Weiss of The Boston Globe gave the episode a mixed review. She said that the time leap proved to be successful, as the show had been "flailing" for several seasons and concluded that, "so far, at least, this season promises to be less about plot than personality. That doesn't mean the show is perfect - it never was - but it's better, and that's a big relief." The Pittsburgh Post-Gazette's Rob Owen was positive in his review, noting that the writers handled the five-year leap well, especially in regards to Lynette's storyline. He complimented the episode's comedy and expressed his hope that the time jump would allow the writers to focus on humor rather than overly-dramatic storylines.
