= List of awards and nominations received by Desperate Housewives =

Awards and nominations received by Desperate Housewives
Awards and nominations
Award	Won	Nominated
AFI Awards	1	1
ALMA Awards	1	6
ADG Excellence in Production Design Awards	1	2
Casting Society of America	1	4
Costume Designers Guild Awards	0	3
Emmy Awards	7	38
GLAAD Media Awards	1	3
Gold Derby Awards	8	36
Golden Globe Awards	3	13
NAACP Image Awards	2	4
People's Choice Awards	2	12
PRISM Awards	3	15
Satellite Awards	4	12
Screen Actors Guild Awards	4	8
TCA Awards	1	5
Teen Choice Awards	5	18
Writers Guild of America Awards	0	3
Young Artist Awards	1	8
- Total number of wins and nominations
Totals	71	273

Desperate Housewives is an American television comedy drama and mystery series which first aired on ABC from October 3, 2004 until May 13, 2012, and was created by Marc Cherry. The series follows the lives of a group of women living on fictional street named Wisteria Lane as seen through the eyes of their late friend Mary Alice Young (portrayed by Brenda Strong), who narrates the series. The four main characters featured in the series are Susan Mayer (portrayed by Teri Hatcher), Lynette Scavo (portrayed by Felicity Huffman), Bree Van de Kamp (portrayed by Marcia Cross) and Gabrielle Solis (portrayed by Eva Longoria). The series received generally favorable reviews from critics and won numerous awards, including seven Primetime Emmy, two People's Choice, three Golden Globe, four Screen Actors Guild and many other awards. Its first five seasons were ranked within the top ten most-watched television shows in the United States. Huffman and Kathryn Joosten were the only actresses to win Primetime Emmy Awards for their roles of Lynette Scavo and Karen McCluskey, respectively, while Hatcher won a Golden Globe Award and was nominated for a Primetime Emmy Award for her role of Susan Mayer; Cross was nominated for both Primetime Emmy and Golden Globe Awards for her role of Bree Van de Kamp, while Longoria was nominated for Golden Globe and Screen Actors Guild Awards for her role of Gabrielle Solis. Strong, who narrated the series as late Mary Alice Young, was nominated for two Primetime Emmy Awards for Outstanding Voice-Over Performance.

== ADG Excellence in Production Design Awards ==
Year	Category	Nominee	Result
2005	Single-Camera Television Series	Thomas A. Walsh; Kim Hix; Erik Carlson; Steven Samanen ("Ah, But Underneath")	Won
2006	Single-Camera Television Series	Thomas A. Walsh; Eric Carlson; Steven Samanen ("They Asked Me Why I Believe in You")	Nominated

== AFI Awards ==
Year	Category	Result
2005	TV Program of the Year	Won

== ALMA Awards ==
Year	Category	Nominee	Result
2008	Outstanding Director of a Television Series	Jay Torres ("Distant Past")	Nominated
2008	Outstanding Supporting Actor in a Drama Television Series	Ricardo Antonio Chavira	Nominated
2009	Outstanding Actor in a Comedy Series	Ricardo Antonio Chavira	Nominated
2009	Outstanding Actress in a Comedy Series	Eva Longoria	Nominated
2011	Outstanding Television Series		Won
2011	Favorite TV Actor – Leading Role	Ricardo Antonio Chavira	Nominated

== American Cinema Editors ==
Year	Category	Nominee	Result
2005	Best Edited One-Hour Series for Television	Michael Berenbaum ("Pilot")	Nominated

== BAFTA Awards ==
Year	Category	Result
2006	Pioneer Audience Award	Nominated

== Bambi Awards ==
Year	Category	Result
2007	TV Series International	Won

== Banff Television Festival ==
Year	Category	Nominee	Result
2005	Best Continuing Series	"Pilot"	Won
2006	Best Comedy Program	"That's Good, That's Bad"	Nominated
2008	Best Comedy Program	"Now You Know"	Nominated
2009	Best Continuing Series	"You're Gonna Love Tomorrow"	Nominated

== BET Awards ==
Year	Category	Nominee	Result
2006	Best Actress	Alfre Woodard	Nominated

== BMI Film & TV Awards ==
Year	Category	Nominee	Result
2005	BMI TV Music Award	Danny Elfman; Steve Bartek; Stewart Copeland; Steve Jablonsky	Won
2008	BMI TV Music Award	Danny Elfman; Steve Jablonsky	Won
2009	BMI TV Music Award	Danny Elfman; Steve Jablonsky	Won

== Casting Society of America ==
Year	Category	Nominee	Result
2005	Best Comedy Pilot Casting	Scott Genkinger; Junie Lowry-Johnson	Won
2005	Best Comedy Episodic Casting	Scott Genkinger; Junie Lowry-Johnson	Nominated
2006	Best Comedy Episodic Casting	Scott Genkinger; Junie Lowry-Johnson	Nominated
2007	Best Comedy Episodic Casting	Scott Genkinger; Junie Lowry-Johnson	Nominated

== Cinema Audio Society Awards ==
Year	Category	Nominee	Result
2010	Outstanding Achievement in Sound Mixing for Television Series	Mike Olman; Ken Kobett; Agamemnon Andrianos ("Boom Crunch")	Nominated

== Costume Designers Guild Awards ==
Year	Category	Nominee	Result
2005	Best Costume Design – Contemporary TV Series	Catherine Adair	Nominated
2006	Best Costume Design – Contemporary TV Series	Catherine Adair	Nominated
2007	Best Costume Design – Contemporary TV Series	Catherine Adair	Nominated

== Directors Guild of America Awards ==
Year	Category	Nominee	Result
2004	Outstanding Directing – Comedy Series	Charles McDougall ("Pilot")	Nominated
2004	Outstanding Directing – Comedy Series	Arlene Sanford ("Pretty Little Picture")	Nominated
2007	Outstanding Directing – Comedy Series	David Grossman ("Something's Coming")	Nominated

== Emmy Awards ==
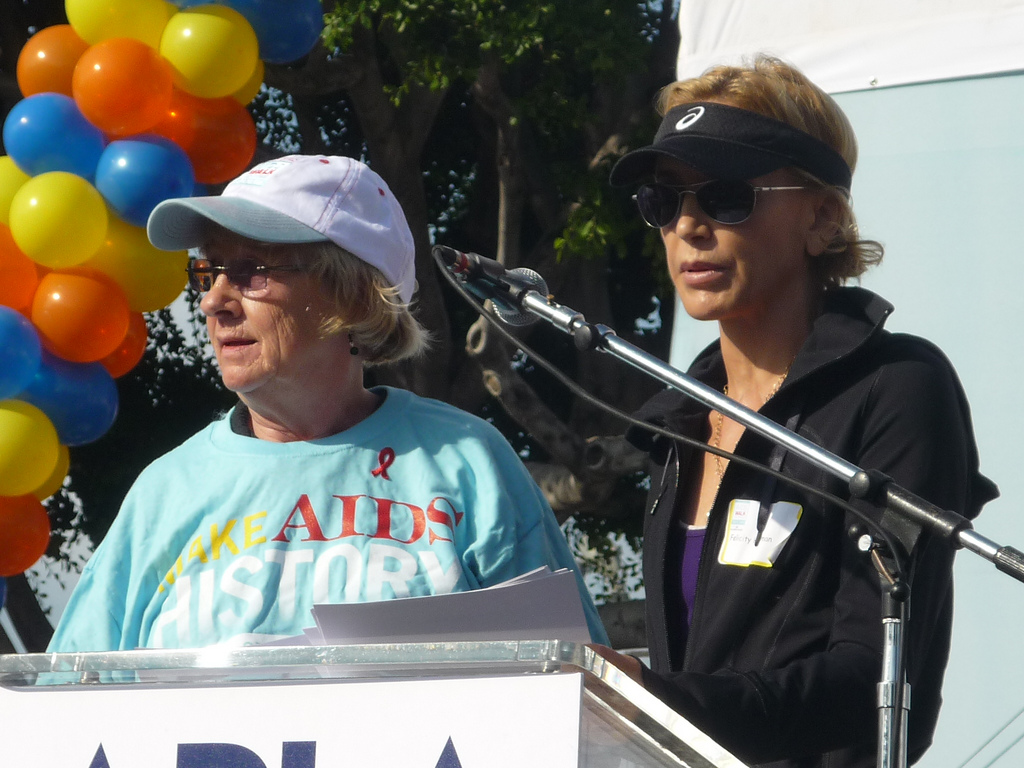
Kathryn Joosten (left) and Felicity Huffman (right) are the only Desperate Housewives actresses who won Primetime Emmy Awards for their roles on the show (Karen McCluskey and Lynette Scavo, respectively).

Primetime Emmy Awards
Year	Category	Nominee	Episode	Result
2005	Outstanding Comedy Series			Nominated
2005	Outstanding Lead Actress in a Comedy Series	Marcia Cross	"Running to Stand Still"	Nominated
2005	Outstanding Lead Actress in a Comedy Series	Teri Hatcher	"Move On"	Nominated
2005	Outstanding Lead Actress in a Comedy Series	Felicity Huffman	"Pilot"	Won
2005	Outstanding Art Direction for a Single-Camera Series	Thomas A. Walsh; Erik Carlson; Erica Rogalla	"Suspicious Minds"	Nominated
2005	Outstanding Casting for a Comedy Series	Scott Genkinger; Junie Lowry-Johnson		Won
2005	Outstanding Costumes for a Series	Catherine Adair; Joyce Unruh; Karo Vartanian	"Suspicious Minds"	Nominated
2005	Outstanding Directing for a Comedy Series	Charles McDougall	"Pilot"	Won
2005	Outstanding Guest Actress in a Comedy Series	Kathryn Joosten	"Love Is in the Air"; "Live Alone and Like It"	Won
2005	Outstanding Guest Actress in a Comedy Series	Lupe Ontiveros		Nominated
2005	Outstanding Main Title Design	Garson Yu; Yolanda Santosa		Nominated
2005	Outstanding Main Title Theme Music	Danny Elfman		Won
2005	Outstanding Single-Camera Picture Editing for a Comedy Series	Michael Berenbaum	"Pilot"	Won
2005	Outstanding Single-Camera Picture Editing for a Comedy Series	Jonathan Posell	"Pretty Little Picture"	Nominated
2005	Outstanding Writing for a Comedy Series	Marc Cherry	"Pilot"	Nominated
2006	Outstanding Supporting Actress in a Comedy Series	Alfre Woodard	"You'll Never Get Away from Me"; "I Know Things Now"	Nominated
2006	Outstanding Single-Camera Picture Editing for a Comedy Series	Nancy Morrison	"That's Good, That's Bad"	Nominated
2006	Outstanding Hairstyling for a Series	Gabor Heiligenberg; Dena Green; James Dunham; Nicole DeFrancesco	"Remember"	Nominated
2006	Outstanding Guest Actress in a Comedy Series	Shirley Knight	"You'll Never Get Away from Me"	Nominated
2006	Outstanding Costumes for a Series	Catherine Adair; Joyce Unruh; Karo Vartanian	"Next"	Nominated
2006	Outstanding Casting for a Comedy Series	Scott Genkinger; Junie Lowry-Johnson		Nominated
2006	Outstanding Art Direction for a Single-Camera Series	Thomas A. Walsh; Erik Carlson; Erica Rogalla	"There's Something About a War"	Nominated
2007	Outstanding Lead Actress in a Comedy Series	Felicity Huffman	"Bang"	Nominated
2007	Outstanding Casting for a Comedy Series	Scott Genkinger; Junie Lowry-Johnson		Nominated
2007	Outstanding Costumes for a Series	Catherine Adair; Joyce Unruh; Karo Vartanian	"Getting Married Today"	Nominated
2007	Outstanding Guest Actress in a Comedy Series	Dixie Carter	"Children and Art"	Nominated
2007	Outstanding Guest Actress in a Comedy Series	Laurie Metcalf	"Listen to the Rain on the Roof"	Nominated
2007	Outstanding Hairstyling for a Series	Gabor Heiligenberg; Dena Green; James Dunham; Maria Fernandez DiSarro	"It Takes Two"	Nominated
2008	Outstanding Costumes for a Series	Catherine Adair; Joyce Unruh; Karo Vartanian	"In Buddy's Eyes"	Nominated
2008	Outstanding Guest Actress in a Comedy Series	Polly Bergen	"Distant Past"	Nominated
2008	Outstanding Guest Actress in a Comedy Series	Kathryn Joosten	"Welcome to Kanagawa"	Won
2008	Outstanding Hairstyling for a Single-Camera Series	Gabor Heiligenberg; Dena Green; James Dunham; Maria Fernandez DiSarro	"In Buddy's Eyes"	Nominated
2009	Outstanding Guest Actor in a Comedy Series	Beau Bridges	"The Best Thing That Ever Could Have Happened"	Nominated
2009	Outstanding Hairstyling for a Single-Camera Series	Gabor Heiligenberg; Dena Green; James Dunham; Maria Fernandez DiSarro	"The Best Thing That Ever Could Have Happened"	Nominated
2010	Outstanding Guest Actress in a Comedy Series	Kathryn Joosten	"The Chase"	Nominated
2011	Outstanding Voice-Over Performance	Brenda Strong	"Come on Over for Dinner"	Nominated
2012	Outstanding Voice-Over Performance	Brenda Strong	"Give Me the Blame"; "Finishing the Hat"	Nominated
2012	Outstanding Supporting Actress in a Comedy Series	Kathryn Joosten	"Give Me the Blame"; "Finishing the Hat"; (posthumous)	Nominated

== GLAAD Media Awards ==
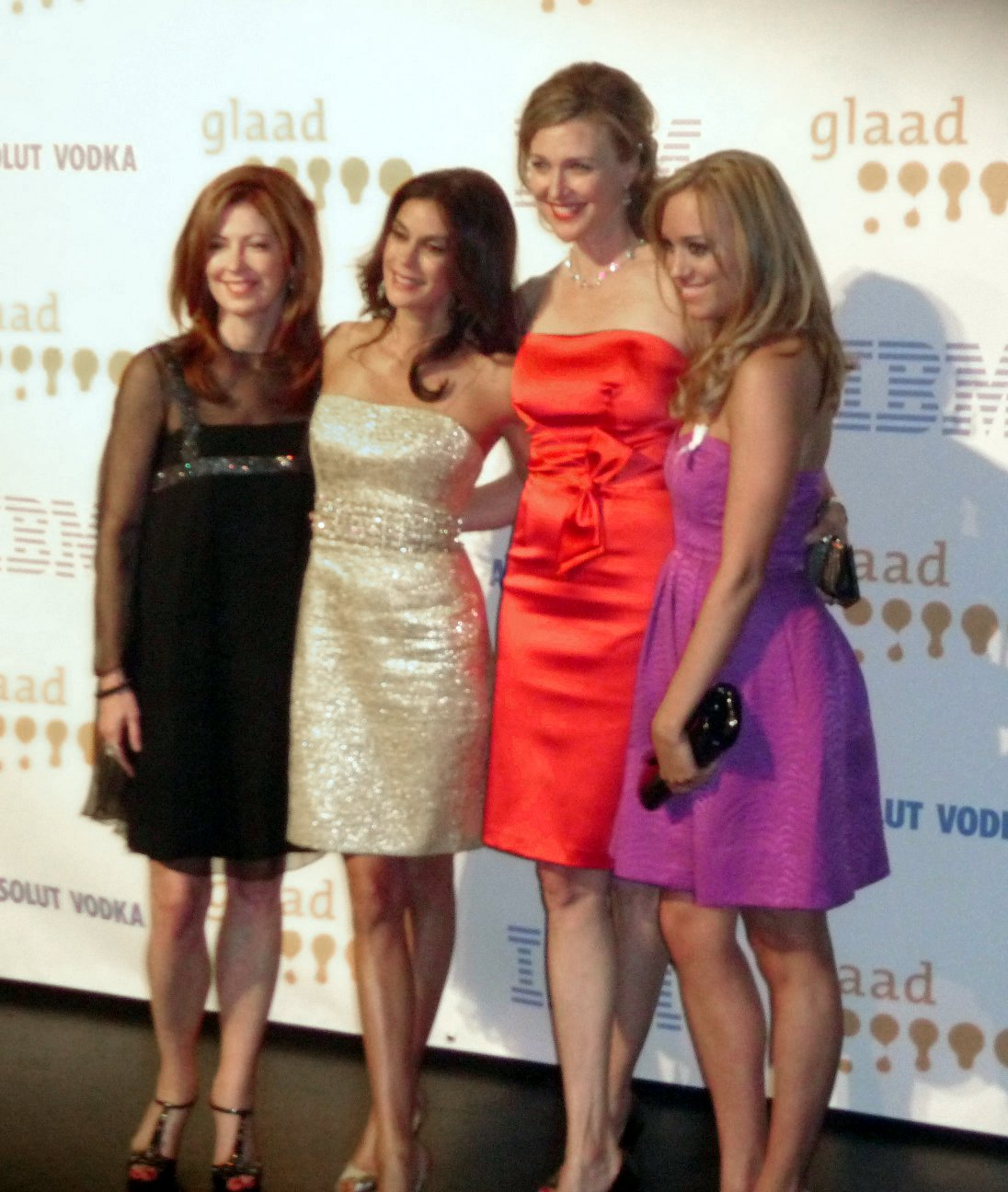
L–R: Dana Delany, Teri Hatcher, Brenda Strong and Andrea Bowen at the 20th GLAAD Media Awards at the Nokia Theatre in Los Angeles, California on April 18, 2009. At the ceremony, Desperate Housewives won its only GLAAD Media Award – for Outstanding Comedy Series – after three nominations.

Year	Category	Result
2007	Outstanding Comedy Series	Nominated
2008	Outstanding Comedy Series	Nominated
2009	Outstanding Comedy Series	Won

== Gold Derby Awards ==
Year	Category	Nominee	Result
2005	Best Comedy Series		Nominated
2005	Best Comedy Actress	Teri Hatcher	Nominated
2005	Best Comedy Actress	Felicity Huffman	Nominated
2005	Best Comedy Actress	Marcia Cross	Nominated
2005	Best Comedy Supporting Actress	Nicollette Sheridan	Nominated
2005	Best Comedy Guest Actress	Lupe Ontiveros	Won
2005	Best Comedy Guest Actress	Lesley Ann Warren	Nominated
2005	Best Comedy Guest Actor	Bob Newhart	Nominated
2005	Best Comedy Episode of the Year	"Pilot"	Won
2005	Best Comedy Episode of the Year	"Pretty Little Picture"	Nominated
2005	Performer of the Year	Marcia Cross	Nominated
2005	Performer of the Year	Teri Hatcher	Nominated
2005	Breakthrough Performer of the Year	Teri Hatcher	Won
2005	Breakthrough Performer of the Year	Eva Longoria	Nominated
2006	Best Comedy Series		Nominated
2006	Best Comedy Actress	Marcia Cross	Won
2006	Best Comedy Actress	Eva Longoria	Nominated
2006	Best Comedy Guest Actress	Carol Burnett	Nominated
2006	Best Comedy Guest Actress	Shirley Knight	Nominated
2006	Best Comedy Episode of the Year	"Next"	Nominated
2006	Performer of the Year	Marcia Cross	Won
2006	Best Ensemble of the Year		Nominated
2007	Best Comedy Series		Nominated
2007	Best Comedy Actress	Felicity Huffman	Nominated
2007	Best Comedy Supporting Actress	Nicollette Sheridan	Nominated
2007	Best Comedy Guest Actress	Laurie Metcalf	Won
2007	Best Comedy Episode of the Year	"Bang"	Won
2008	Best Comedy Series		Nominated
2008	Best Comedy Actress	Marcia Cross	Nominated
2008	Best Comedy Supporting Actress	Dana Delany	Nominated
2008	Best Comedy Episode of the Year	"The Game"	Nominated
2009	Best Comedy Actress	Eva Longoria Parker	Nominated
2009	Best Comedy Guest Actor	Beau Bridges	Won
2009	Best Comedy Episode of the Year	"The Best Thing That Ever Could Have Happened"	Nominated
2012	Best Comedy Series		Nominated
2012	Best Comedy Actress	Marcia Cross	Nominated

== Golden Globe Awards ==
Year	Category	Nominee	Result
2005	Best Series – Musical or Comedy		Won
2005	Best Actress – Television Series Musical or Comedy	Marcia Cross	Nominated
2005	Best Actress – Television Series Musical or Comedy	Teri Hatcher	Won
2005	Best Actress – Television Series Musical or Comedy	Felicity Huffman	Nominated
2005	Best Supporting Actress – Series, Miniseries or TV Film	Nicollette Sheridan	Nominated
2006	Best Series – Musical or Comedy		Won
2006	Best Actress – Television Series Musical or Comedy	Marcia Cross	Nominated
2006	Best Actress – Television Series Musical or Comedy	Teri Hatcher	Nominated
2006	Best Actress – Television Series Musical or Comedy	Felicity Huffman	Nominated
2006	Best Actress – Television Series Musical or Comedy	Eva Longoria	Nominated
2007	Best Series – Musical or Comedy		Nominated
2007	Best Actress – Television Series Musical or Comedy	Marcia Cross	Nominated
2007	Best Actress – Television Series Musical or Comedy	Felicity Huffman	Nominated

== Goldene Kamera ==
Year	Category	Result
2009	Best US Series	Nominated

== IFMCA Awards ==
Year	Category	Nominee	Result
2004	Best Original Score for Television	Danny Elfman; Steve Bartek	Won

== Imagen Foundation Awards ==
Year	Category	Nominee	Result
2005	Best Television Actress	Eva Longoria	Nominated
2007	Best Television Actress	Eva Longoria	Nominated
2010	Best Television Actor	Ricardo Antonio Chavira	Nominated

== Monte-Carlo Television Festival ==
=== Golden Nymph Awards ===
Year	Category	Result
2006	International TV Audience Award for Comedy TV Series	Won
2007	International TV Audience Award for Comedy TV Series	Won
2008	International TV Audience Award for Comedy TV Series	Won
2009	International TV Audience Award for Comedy TV Series	Won
2010	International TV Audience Award for Comedy TV Series	Won
2011	International TV Audience Award for Comedy TV Series	Won
2012	International TV Audience Award for Comedy TV Series	Won

== Motion Picture Sound Editors ==
=== Golden Reel Awards ===
Year	Category	Nominee	Result
2005	Best Sound Editing in Television Episodic – Music	Shie Rozow ("Running to Stand Still")	Nominated
2006	Best Sound Editing in Television Short Form – Music	Shie Rozow ("Sorting Out the Dirty Laundry")	Nominated

== NAACP Image Awards ==
Year	Category	Nominee	Result
2006	Outstanding Supporting Actor in a Comedy Series	Mehcad Brooks	Nominated
2011	Outstanding Actress in a Comedy Series	Vanessa L. Williams	Won
2012	Outstanding Actress in a Comedy Series	Vanessa L. Williams	Nominated
2013	Outstanding Supporting Actress in a Comedy Series	Vanessa L. Williams	Won

== National Television Awards ==
Year	Category	Nominee	Result
2005	Most Popular Drama		Nominated
2006	Most Popular Drama		Nominated
2008	Most Popular Drama		Nominated
2008	Outstanding Drama Performance	Eva Longoria	Nominated

== New York International Film and TV Festival ==
Year	Category	Result
2009	Best Drama Series	Won

== OFTA Television Awards ==
Year	Category	Nominee	Result
2004	Best Comedy Series		Won
2004	Best Actress in a Comedy Series	Felicity Huffman	Nominated
2004	Best Actress in a Comedy Series	Marcia Cross	Won
2004	Best Guest Actress in a Comedy Series	Christine Estabrook	Nominated
2004	Best Ensemble in a Comedy Series		Nominated
2004	Best Direction in a Comedy Series		Nominated
2004	Best Writing in a Comedy Series	Marc Cherry	Nominated
2004	Best Music in a Series	Danny Elfman ("Pilot")	Nominated
2004	Best Costume Design in a Series	Catherine Adair; Joyce Unruh; Karo Vartanian ("Suspicious Minds")	Nominated
2004	Best Makeup/Hairstyling in a Series	John Elliott; Stacy Halax; Gina Rylander; Sherilyn Stetz; Lisa Marie Rosenberg; Nicole DeFrancesco; James Dunham ("Suspicious Minds")	Nominated
2004	Best Sound in a Series	Mike Olman; Ken Kobatt; Agamemnon Andrianos ("Guilty")	Nominated
2004	Best Lighting in a Series	Henry Cantor; Steve Zvorsky ("Pilot")	Won
2004	Best Production Design in a Series	Thomas A. Walsh	Won
2004	Best New Theme Song in a Series, Motion Picture or Miniseries	Danny Elfman	Won
2004	Best New Title Sequence in a Series, Motion Picture or Miniseries	Garson Yu	Won
2005	Best Comedy Series		Nominated
2005	Best Actress in a Comedy Series	Felicity Huffman	Nominated
2005	Best Actress in a Comedy Series	Teri Hatcher	Nominated
2005	Best Actress in a Comedy Series	Marcia Cross	Nominated
2005	Best Guest Actress in a Comedy Series	Kathryn Joosten	Nominated
2005	Best Guest Actress in a Comedy Series	Shirley Knight	Nominated
2005	Best Guest Actress in a Comedy Series	Lesley Ann Warren	Nominated
2005	Best Ensemble in a Comedy Series		Nominated
2005	Best Writing in a Comedy Series	Marc Cherry	Nominated
2006	Best Actress in a Comedy Series	Marcia Cross	Nominated
2006	Best Actress in a Comedy Series	Felicity Huffman	Nominated
2006	Best Guest Actress in a Comedy Series	Kathryn Joosten	Nominated
2006	Best Ensemble in a Comedy Series		Nominated
2007	Best Actress in a Comedy Series	Felicity Huffman	Nominated
2007	Best Guest Actress in a Comedy Series	Lisa Banes	Nominated
2007	Best Guest Actress in a Comedy Series	Laurie Metcalf	Nominated
2007	Best Direction in a Comedy Series		Nominated
2007	Best Writing in a Comedy Series	Marc Cherry	Nominated
2007	Best Ensemble in a Comedy Series		Nominated
2008	Best Costume Design in a Series	Catherine Adair	Nominated

== People's Choice Awards ==
Year	Category	Nominee	Result
2005	Favorite New TV Drama		Won
2006	Favorite TV Drama		Nominated
2006	Favorite Female TV Star	Teri Hatcher	Nominated
2007	Favorite Female TV Star	Eva Longoria	Won
2010	Favorite TV Comedy Actress	Eva Longoria	Nominated
2010	Favorite TV Comedy		Nominated
2011	Favorite TV Family	The Scavos	Nominated
2012	Favorite TV Actress	Eva Longoria	Nominated

== PRISM Awards ==
Year	Category	Nominee	Result
2005	TV Comedy Series Multi-Episode Storyline	Felicity Huffman (for Lynette Scavo's ritalin addiction)	Won
2005	TV Comedy Series Episode	"Suspicious Minds"	Nominated
2005	Performance in a Comedy Series	Felicity Huffman	Nominated
2005	Performance in a Comedy Series	Marcia Cross	Nominated
2007	Performance in a Comedy Series	Marcia Cross	Nominated
2007	Performance in a Comedy Series	Shawn Pyfrom	Nominated
2008	Performance in a Comedy Series	Teri Hatcher	Nominated
2008	Performance in a Comedy Series	James Denton	Won
2009	Performance in a Comedy Series	Dana Delany	Won
2009	Performance in a Comedy Series	Marcia Cross	Nominated
2009	TV Comedy Series Episode	"Mirror Mirror"	Nominated
2011	TV Comedy Series Episode	"Truly Content"	Nominated
2012	TV Comedy Series Episode	"Everything's Different, Nothing's Changed"	Nominated
2012	Performance in a Comedy Series	Marcia Cross	Nominated
2012	Performance in a Comedy Series	Shawn Pyfrom	Nominated

== Producers Guild of America Awards ==
Year	Category	Nominee	Result
2006	Outstanding Producer of Episodic Television – Comedy Series	Marc Cherry	Nominated

== Publicists Guild of America ==
Year	Category	Result
2005	Maxwell Weinberg Award for Television	Won

== Satellite Awards ==
Year	Category	Nominee	Result
January 2005	Best Television Series – Musical or Comedy		Won
January 2005	Best Actress – Musical or Comedy Series	Marcia Cross	Nominated
January 2005	Best Actress – Musical or Comedy Series	Teri Hatcher	Nominated
January 2005	Best Actress – Musical or Comedy Series	Felicity Huffman	Nominated
December 2005	Best Actress – Musical or Comedy Series	Felicity Huffman	Won
December 2005	Best DVD Release – Television Series	The Complete First Season	Nominated
2006	Best Actress – Musical or Comedy Series	Marcia Cross	Won
2006	Best Supporting Actress – Series, Miniseries or Television Film	Laurie Metcalf	Nominated
2007	Best Supporting Actress – Series, Miniseries or Television Film	Polly Bergen	Nominated
2007	Best Actress – Musical or Comedy Series	Felicity Huffman	Nominated
2011	Best Actress – Musical or Comedy Series	Felicity Huffman	Nominated
2011	Best Supporting Actress – Series, Miniseries or Television Film	Vanessa L. Williams	Won

== Screen Actors Guild Awards ==
Year	Category	Nominee	Result
2005	Outstanding Performance by a Female Actor in a Comedy Series	Teri Hatcher	Won
2005	Outstanding Performance by an Ensemble in a Comedy Series		Won
2006	Outstanding Performance by an Ensemble in a Comedy Series		Won
2006	Outstanding Performance by a Female Actor in a Comedy Series	Felicity Huffman	Won
2007	Outstanding Performance by a Female Actor in a Comedy Series	Felicity Huffman	Nominated
2007	Outstanding Performance by an Ensemble in a Comedy Series		Nominated
2008	Outstanding Performance by an Ensemble in a Comedy Series		Nominated
2009	Outstanding Performance by an Ensemble in a Comedy Series		Nominated

== TCA Awards ==
Year	Category	Nominee	Result
2005	Program of the Year		Won
2005	Outstanding Achievement in Comedy		Nominated
2005	Outstanding New Program		Nominated
2005	Individual Achievement in Comedy	Marcia Cross	Nominated
2005	Individual Achievement in Comedy	Teri Hatcher	Nominated

== Teen Choice Awards ==
Year	Category	Nominee	Result
2005	Choice TV Show: Comedy		Nominated
2005	Choice TV: Breakout Show		Won
2005	Choice V-Cast		Won
2005	Choice TV Actor: Comedy	Jesse Metcalfe	Nominated
2005	Choice TV: Breakout Actor	Jesse Metcalfe	Won
2005	Choice TV Actress: Comedy	Eva Longoria	Nominated
2005	Choice TV: Breakout Actress	Eva Longoria	Won
2006	Choice TV Show: Comedy		Nominated
2006	Choice TV Actor: Comedy	Jesse Metclafe	Nominated
2006	Choice TV Actor: Comedy	James Denton	Won
2006	Choice TV Actress: Comedy	Teri Hatcher	Nominated
2006	Choice TV Actress: Comedy	Eva Longoria	Nominated
2007	Choice TV Actress: Comedy	Eva Longoria	Nominated
2007	Choice TV Show: Comedy		Nominated
2008	Choice TV Show: Comedy		Nominated
2008	Choice TV Actress: Comedy	Eva Longoria	Nominated
2009	Choice TV Actress: Comedy	Eva Longoria	Nominated
2009	Choice TV Show: Comedy		Nominated

== TP de Oro ==
Year	Category	Result
2006	Best Foreign Series	Won
2008	Best Foreign Series	Nominated
2010	Best Foreign Series	Nominated

== TV Land Awards ==
Year	Category	Result
2005	Future Classic Award	Won

== TV Quick and Choice Awards ==
Year	Category	Result
2005	Best New Drama	Won
2007	Best International TV Show	Won

== Writers Guild of America Awards ==
Year	Category	Nominee	Result
2005	Best Writing in Television – Episodic Comedy	Jenna Bans; Kevin Murphy ("Next")	Nominated
2006	Best Writing in Television – Episodic Comedy	Jenna Bans; Kevin Murphy ("It Takes Two")	Nominated
2006	Best Writing in Television – Episodic Comedy	Josh Senter ("Don't Look at Me")	Nominated

== Women's Image Network Awards ==
Year	Category	Nominee	Result
2005	Actress in Drama Series	Marcia Cross ("Pilot")	Nominated

== Young Artist Awards ==
Year	Category	Nominee	Result
2005	Best Leading Young Actress in a Comedy or Drama TV Series	Andrea Bowen	Nominated
2005	Best Supporting Young Actor in a Comedy or Drama TV Series	Cody Kasch	Nominated
2005	Best Young Actor Age Ten or Younger in a Comedy or Drama TV Series	Zane Huett	Won
2006	Best Young Recurring Actress on a Comedy Series	Joy Lauren	Nominated
2007	Best Young Recurring Actress on a Comedy Series	Rachel G. Fox	Nominated
2007	Best Performance in a TV Series (Comedy or Drama) – Guest Starring Young Actress	Chloë Grace Moretz	Nominated
2008	Best Young Recurring Actress in a Comedy Series	Rachel G. Fox	Nominated
2008	Best Young Recurring Actor in a Comedy Series	Jake Cherry	Nominated
