= Everybody Says Don't =

"Everybody Says Don't" is a Stephen Sondheim song from the musical Anyone Can Whistle. It may refer to:

- Everybody Says Don't (Desperate Housewives season two episode) a 2006 episode of the TV series Desperate Housewives.
- Everybody Says Don't (Desperate Housewives season five episode) a 2009 episode of the TV series Desperate Housewives.
