= Russell Madness =

- Directed by: Robert Vince
- Starring: David Milchard; John Ratzenberger; Will Sasso; Mason Vale Cotton; John Hennigan; Sean Giambrone; Fred Willard
- Release date: February 21, 2015
- Running time: 92 minutes
- Country: United States
- Language: English

Russell Madness is a 2015 American sports family film directed by Robert Vince and starring David Milchard, John Ratzenberger, Will Sasso, Mason Vale Cotton, John Hennigan, Sean Giambrone and Fred Willard.

== Cast ==
- Mason Vale Cotton as Max
- Sean Giambrone as the voice of Russell
- Mckenna Grace as Lena
- David Milchard as Nate
- Kate Reinders as Colleen
- Fred Willard as TJ
- John Ratzenberger as Mick Vaughn
- Michael Teigen as Bad Chad
- Will Sasso as the voice of Hunk
- John Hennigan as The Hammer

== Release ==
The film was released in theaters on February 21, 2015.

== Reception ==
Pat Padua of Spectrum Culture rated the film three out of five.

Renee Longstreet of Common Sense Media awarded the film two stars out of five.
