= Mason Vale Cotton =

American actor

- Born: June 25, 2002 (age 24); San Diego, California, U.S.
- Education: Claremont McKenna College
- Occupation: Actor
- Years active: 2006–present
- Known for: Desperate Housewives; Mad Men
- Relatives: Maxwell Perry Cotton (brother)

Mason Vale Cotton (born June 25, 2002) is an American actor known for his roles as M.J. Delfino in the ABC soap opera Desperate Housewives (2008–2012) and as Bobby Draper in the AMC drama series Mad Men (2012–2015), the latter of which earned him a nomination for the Screen Actors Guild Award for Outstanding Performance by an Ensemble in a Drama Series in 2016. In 2015, he starred as Max in the film Russell Madness, reprising the role in the 2020 series spinoff Russell Maniac. In 2017, he voiced Arnold Shortman in the Emmy-winning animated Nickelodeon film Hey Arnold!: The Jungle Movie.

== Early life ==
He was born on June 25, 2002, in San Diego, California, and began acting with an uncredited role in the 2006 television special A Dennis the Menace Christmas.

== Career ==
From 2008 to 2012, he played MJ Delfino, the child of Susan Mayer and Mike Delfino in the ABC soap opera Desperate Housewives,. Cotton then continued his career as a child actor in the AMC drama series Mad Men (2012–2015) as Bobby Draper, a role that garnered him a nomination at the 2016 Screen Actors Guild Awards, in the category of Outstanding Performance by an Ensemble in a Drama Series as part of the series' ensemble cast.

Additionally, he provided additional voices for the 2011 animated film Happy Feet Two and played Max in the film Russell Madness (2015) and its 2020 series spinoff Russell Maniac. In 2017, he voiced the title character in the television film Hey Arnold!: The Jungle Movie.

== Awards and nominations ==
Cotton has received various awards and recognitions throughout his career. (Note: The main reference for this part of the article is his IMDb profile.) He has starred in various award-winning productions, including multi-Emmy winning series like Desperate Housewives and Mad Men, in addition to the 2017 Emmy Award-winning animation Hey Arnold!: The Jungle Movie.

- 2016 – Screen Actors Guild Award for Outstanding Performance by an Ensemble in a Drama Series, nomination, for Mad Men
- 2017 – Behind the Voice Award for Best Vocal Ensemble in a TV Special/Direct-to-DVD Title or Short, win, for Hey Arnold!: The Jungle Movie

== Filmography ==
=== Film ===
| Year | Title | Role | Notes |
|---|---|---|---|
| 2006 | A Dennis the Menace Christmas | Futuristic Boy | Uncredited |
| 2010 | Radio Free Albemuth | Ezra Brady | |
| 2011 | Happy Feet Two | Additional voices | |
| 2013 | Snake & Mongoose | Tommy (at 7) | |
| 2015 | Russell Madness | Max | |
| 2017 | Mad Families | Chuckle | |
| 2017 | Scales: Mermaids Are Real | Martin | |

=== Television ===
| Year | Title | Role | Notes |
|---|---|---|---|
| 2008 | Medium | Ben Goldman | Episode: "And Then" |
| 2008 | ER | Brian | Episode: "Life After Death" |
| 2008–2012 | Desperate Housewives | M.J. Delfino | 54 episodes |
| 2009 | Prep & Landing | Timmy Terwelp (voice) | Television special |
| 2012–2015 | Mad Men | Bobby Draper | 33 episodes |
| 2016 | The Grinder | Son | Episode: "Genesis" |
| 2017 | Hey Arnold!: The Jungle Movie | Arnold Shortman (voice) | Television film |
| 2020 | Russell Maniac | Max Ferraro | 7 episodes |
| 2023 | Party Down | Todd Meuse | Episode: "Sepulveda Basin High School Spring Play Opening Night" |

== See also ==
- MJ Delfino (Desperate Housewives)
- Bobby Draper (Mad Men)
- List of Desperate Housewives cast members (and characters)
- List of Mad Men characters
- List of American current child actors (and former)
