= Dave Williams (Desperate Housewives) =

Fictional character on Desperate Housewives

- Neal McDonough as Dave Williams
- Portrayed by: Neal McDonough
- Duration: 2008–2009
- First appearance: "You're Gonna Love Tomorrow"; 5x01, September 28, 2008
- Last appearance: "If It's Only In Your Head"; 5x24, May 17, 2009
- Created by: Marc Cherry
In-universe information
- Other names: David Dash
- Occupation: Former motivational speaker
- Siblings: Steven Dash (brother; deceased); Mrs Britt-McCann (sister-in-law); Mr Britt (brother-in-law; deceased)
- Spouse: Lila Dash (m. 2001; died 2011) Edie Britt (m. 2012; died 2015)
- Children: Paige Dash (deceased)
- Stepchildren: Travers McLain (via Edie)
- Other relatives: Austin McCann (nephew-in-law); Benjamin Tyson Katz (great-nephew-in-law; via Austin and Danielle Van de Kamp)

David Williams (also Dash) is a fictional character from the ABC television series Desperate Housewives, portrayed by Neal McDonough and created by Marc Cherry. The character was introduced in the fifth season as Edie Britt's (Nicollette Sheridan) husband, and is the focus of the fifth season’s mystery element.

== Development and casting ==
Neal McDonough's casting as Dave Williams was announced in July 2008. McDonough did not audition for the role, but was offered it after meeting with Marc Cherry. The series creator wanted McDonough to portray Dave after he saw the actor playing the role of David McNorris, an alcoholic County Asst. D.A. in NBC's short-lived crime drama Boomtown, and thus wanted to see the dark side of David McNorris "infused in the dark side of David Williams". McDonough described his character as "this really sweet guy next door and then something tragic happens to him and his personality splits in half. You like Dave and you feel for him, but he also creeps the hell out of you."

Half-way through the season, just after the death of Nicollette Sheridan's character Edie Britt was filmed, McDonough already knew that his character would last just one season, and though he hinted that Dave might return for a brief arc in subsequent seasons, this never happened.

== Storylines ==
Dave, having married Edie, convinces her to move back to Wisteria Lane, paying the tenant who was renting her house to leave. After moving back in, Edie announces that she is married and introduces Dave. Outwardly, Dave seems refined and affable, but in a phone conversation with his psychiatrist, Dr. Samuel Heller, he says his rage is still with him, but there is one unnamed person who needs to worry about it. Karen McCluskey immediately clashes with Dave after she insults Edie, resulting in her cat Toby's disappearance. Toby reappears only after Karen apologizes to Edie. Karen becomes suspicious and investigates Dave. His response is to immediately plant the seed that Karen is old and senile. He causes her to breakdown during her 70th birthday party, resulting in Karen being taken to the hospital. Meanwhile, he has purchased another house in the neighborhood so that he could rent it at a reasonable rate to Mike Delfino - who has been living across town since his divorce. He starts a band with Mike, Tom Scavo, Orson Hodge, and Carlos Solis.

After Karen discovers his contact with Dr. Heller, she reveals to him that Dave is in Fairview. Heller immediately travels to Wisteria Lane to confront him, and Dave strangles him in the storage room of the White Horse Club, where his band has entered a Battle of the Bands competition. He then sets a fire in order to cover up the murder. Mike is knocked unconscious, and Dave re-enters the burning building to save him and is hailed a hero.

Dave begins to see vivid hallucinations of his late wife Lila Dash and their daughter, Paige, revealed as the people killed in the car crash that broke up Mike and Susan Delfino's marriage, and tells them he will make Mike pay. One night, Edie finds Dave in conversation with his hallucinations, and Dave reveals that he is a widower, still struggling with her death. She kicks him out of the house for lying to her.

A flashback reveals that Dave married Edie after learning she once lived on Wisteria Lane and never sold the house. Later, Edie decides she does not want to be alone and takes him back. Dave then plans a camping trip with Mike and his girlfriend Katherine Mayfair and tricks Edie into staying home. While alone, she grows suspicious and begins to research Dave's past. She learns it was not only his wife who died in the crash, but also a daughter, also discovering that Mike was the driver of the other car.

Dave, Mike and Katherine leave for their trip, in which Dave tries to shoot Katherine with a hunting rifle to get revenge on Mike, but Edie texts him just as he pulls the trigger, distracting him. Dave returns home to a confrontation with Edie, who tells him she intends to warn Mike. Dave strangles Edie until she falls to the floor but stops before he kills her. Frightened, Edie flees their home but is electrocuted after a car accident and dies.

Susan checks in on Dave after Edie's death. Still unaware of Dave's true identity, she confides that she was the one driving the car during the accident. Dave turns his rage to Susan and decides to kill Mike, and Susan's son, M.J. Delfino, in revenge. He plans a fishing trip with Susan and M.J. and records a video for Mike, stating that he did not want to kill M.J. but that he had to. Mike accidentally watches the tape before his honeymoon, and phones Susan and reveals Dave's true identity. Meanwhile, the police have since identified the body of Dr. Heller and realize Dave's involvement. Dave arranges to meet Mike at the intersection where the accident had happened, so that Mike will hit Dave's car with M.J. and Dave himself inside. However, Dave changes his mind in the last minute after he hallucinates that it is his daughter in the backseat and tells M.J. to get out. Dave awakens, as he imagines saving his family the night of the crash by telling them to stay home. As the camera zooms out, Dave is seen in a secure room at Boston Ridgegate Mental Facility.

== Reception ==
The character of Dave Williams received mixed reviews. Matt Roush of TV Guide described Neal McDonough as "smoothly sinister" and his character as "mysterious and manipulative". Ken Tucker of Entertainment Weekly praised the casting of McDonough, stating that his "ice-blue eyes always look cyborg-ish — perfectly apt for his character". While reviewing the Red Hot Edition of the fifth season's DVD, Aaron Wallace from DVDizzy called the writers "storytelling savants", noting that revealing pieces of the truth helped to head off "the frustration that an ungratified audience can feel when questions abound but answers elude". In a review of the fifth season premiere, Tanner Stransky of Entertainment Weekly described McDonough as "always-creepy" and noted the power Dave holds over Edie.

Stransky later reviewed the season finale and opined that Dave's plan was all about making Susan suffer, but himself too, as he felt responsible for letting his wife and daughter to go out the night they died. According to Stransky, this twist made "this somewhat bloated and too-long-gestating storyline more layered and dynamic."
