= Desperate Housewives season 5 =

Desperate Housewives
- Season 5
- ABC promotional poster for the fifth season of Desperate Housewives. From left to right: Edie, Bree, Susan, Lynette, and Gabrielle.
- Starring: Teri Hatcher; Felicity Huffman; Marcia Cross; Eva Longoria; Nicollette Sheridan; Ricardo Antonio Chavira; Doug Savant; Kyle MacLachlan; Dana Delany; Neal McDonough; Shawn Pyfrom; Brenda Strong; James Denton
- No. of episodes: 24

Release
- Original network: ABC
- Original release: September 28, 2008 – May 17, 2009

Season chronology
- ← Previous; Season 4 Next → Season 6

The fifth season of Desperate Housewives, an American television series created by Marc Cherry, began airing on ABC on September 28, 2008, and concluded on May 17, 2009. The season takes place five years after the events of the season four finale in 2008 and continues to focus on the lives of Wisteria Lane residents Susan Mayer, Lynette Scavo, Bree Hodge, Gabrielle Solis, Edie Britt and Katherine Mayfair, as seen through the eyes of the series' deceased narrator, Mary Alice Young. The season's mystery is centered on Edie Britt's third husband, Dave Williams. The series received media attention following the announcement that Edie, portrayed by Nicollette Sheridan, would be killed off close to the end of the season. Edie takes on the narration in "Look Into Their Eyes and You See What They Know" following her death, marking the second time Mary Alice's voice is not heard in an episode.

The series saw its lowest ratings up to that point in season five. Nevertheless, Desperate Housewives maintained its position as a top-ten series. It was the ninth most-watched series during the 2008–09 television season with an average of 14.8 million viewers per episode.

Season five was released on DVD by ABC Studios as the seven-disc set Desperate Housewives: The Complete Fifth Season — The Red Hot Edition on September 1, 2009 in Region 1, October 21, 2009 in Region 4, and November 9 in Region 2.

== Production ==
Filming began on July 7, 2008 and finished in March 2009.

There was much speculation about the fifth season of the show, due to the many cliffhangers at the end of season four, such as the departure of Edie Britt, and whether she would return after the events of the "Mother Said" episode. When asked about Sheridan's departure, Cherry commented "She won't be back for a few years", a reference to the 'five-year leap' that the show is undertaking. Edie returned to Wisteria Lane with a new husband, Dave, played by Neal McDonough, who joined the cast as a series regular. However, Sheridan left Desperate Housewives towards the end of the season when her character Edie died in an accident involving her car and a dangerous electrical wire in the 18th episode of Season 5, "A Spark. To Pierce the Dark.", which aired on March 22, 2009.

There had also been speculation whether the character of Mike Delfino would return, after the final scene in season four, set five years into the future, which showed Susan in the arms of a new mystery man, Jackson (Gale Harold). The fate of Mike Delfino was later revealed by actor James Denton, who plays Mike, when he told People magazine that he would definitely be returning in Season 5. However, "Mike and Susan have definitely split up," Denton told People.

On October 14, 2008, Gale Harold was seriously injured in a motorcycle accident. His character, Jackson, plays a pivotal role in the fifth season's eighth episode "City on Fire", which finds several Wisteria Lane residents trapped inside a nightclub fire. Cherry said Harold had been filming scenes all week for the episode and had been scheduled to be on set Tuesday, the day of the accident. Marc Cherry said they would await the actor's prognosis before deciding how to proceed, but that at least some changes would have to be made: "We know we're going to rewrite one scene," he said. The show issued a statement: "Gale is part of the 'Desperate Housewives' family and our thoughts and wishes are with him for a speedy recovery." Despite Harold's injury and ongoing recovery, no major Desperate Housewives production disruptions were expected.

== Cast ==
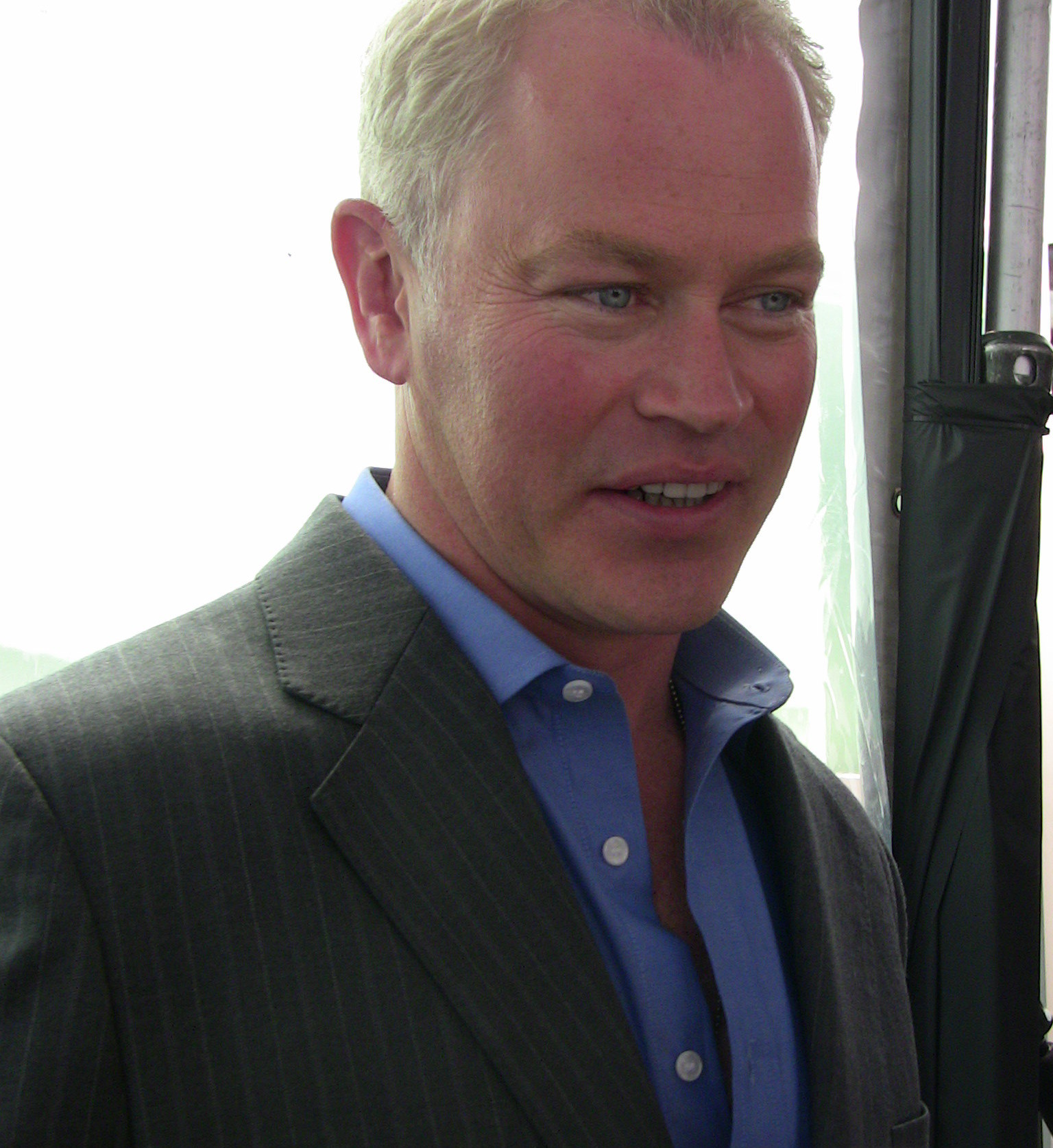
McDonough's character was the subject of the season's main mystery.

The fifth season had thirteen roles receiving star billing, with eleven out of twelve returning from the previous season. The series is narrated by Brenda Strong, who portrays the deceased Mary Alice Young, as she observes from beyond the grave the lives of the Wisteria Lane residents and her former best friends. Teri Hatcher portrayed Susan Mayer, now separated from Mike and in a relationship with her painter. Felicity Huffman portrayed Lynette Scavo, who deals with her now teenage sons. Marcia Cross portrayed Bree Hodge, who has become a successful business woman and author. Eva Longoria portrayed Gabrielle Solis, who has lost her money and beauty and now looks after a blind husband and two daughters. Nicollette Sheridan portrayed Edie Williams, who returns to Wisteria Lane with a new husband after leaving the neighborhood towards the end of the previous season. Ricardo Antonio Chavira portrayed Carlos Solis, Gabrielle's husband who is still blind but with a chance to recover his sight and his career as a business executive. Doug Savant portrayed Tom Scavo, Lynette's husband who is facing a mid-life crisis. Kyle MacLachlan portrayed Orson Hodge, Bree's husband who feels overshadowed by her success. Dana Delany portrayed Katherine Mayfair, Bree's business partner and Mike's new girlfriend. James Denton portrayed Mike Delfino, Susan's ex-husband and the target of a man who seeks revenge on him. Shawn Pyfrom was promoted from an "also starring" credit to a formal "starring" credit playing Andrew Van de Kamp, Bree's homosexual son who now works with her in her business. Also joining the principal cast was actor Neal McDonough as Dave Williams, whose mysterious arc is the season's main storyline. Andrea Bowen departed from the principal cast but was credited as "special guest star" in the episode "City on Fire" playing the role of Julie Mayer, Susan's daughter, who is now attending college.

The "also starring" cast had many changes. The roles of the Scavo children were recast in order to reflect their new ages following the time jump. Charlie and Max Carver replaced Shane and Brent Kinsman as Porter and Preston Scavo, respectively. The Kinsman twins appeared in a flashback in this episode. Joshua Logan Moore was cast as Parker Scavo, a role previously played by Zane Huett, and Kendall Applegate joined the cast as Penny Scavo, who had previously been portrayed by several toddler actresses. Huett did not return for this season. Joy Lauren left the "also starring" cast too, but made two guest appearances as Danielle Katz, Bree's daughter.

Many established guest stars from previous seasons also returned. Kathryn Joosten portrayed Karen McCluskey, one of the most prominent residents of Wisteria Lane. Richard Burgi portrayed Karl Mayer, Susan's ex-husband and Bree's new divorce lawyer. Tuc Watkins and Kevin Rahm respectively played Bob Hunter and Lee McDermott, a gay lawyer and his husband. Part of Susan's storyline were Gale Harold appearing as Jackson Braddock, a painter and Susan's new love interest, Mason Vale Cotton playing M.J. Delfino, Susan and Mike's son, and John Rubinstein portraying Principal Hobson, headmaster at M.J.'s school. Part of Lynette's storyline were Polly Bergen in the role of her mother Stella Wingfield, Gail O'Grady appearing as Anne Schilling, the mother of Porter's best friend who starts an affair with him, and Peter Onorati portraying Warren Schilling, Anne's abusive husband and owner of a club that is burnt down. Part of Gabrielle's storyline were Madison De La Garza and Daniella Baltodano respectively playing Juanita and Celia Solis, stepmother Gaby's troublesome daughters, Jeff Doucette appearing as Father Crowley, priest at the local Catholic church, Frances Conroy portraying Virginia Hildebrand, a rich woman that hires Carlos to become her personal massage therapist, David Starzyk playing Bradley Scott, Carlos's boss after he regains his sight, Ion Overman portraying Maria Scott, Bradley's wife, Megan Hilty acting as Shayla Grove, Bradley's mistress, Lesley Boone in the role of Lucy Blackburn, Carlos's ex-girlfriend from college, and future series regular Maiara Walsh, who appeared as Carlos's niece Ana Solis in the season finale. Part of the main mystery arc were Stephen Spinella portraying Dr. Samuel Heller, Dave's psychiatrist, and Lily Tomlin playing Roberta Simonds, Mrs. McCluskey's sister who helps her to do some research on Dave.

For the 100th episode of the series, many former cast members returned, including Steven Culp as Rex Van de Kamp, Bree's deceased first husband, Christine Estabrook as Martha Huber, the woman that blackmailed Mary Alice and was killed by Paul Young, and Lucille Soong as Yao Lin, Gabrielle's former maid. Beau Bridges made a special guest appearance as Eli Scruggs, Wisteria Lane's handyman who managed to help every one of the housewives in a different way.

== Episodes ==
No. overall	No. in season	Title	Directed by	Written by	Original release date	U.S. viewers (millions)
88	1	"You're Gonna Love Tomorrow"	Larry Shaw	Marc Cherry	September 28, 2008	18.68
Five years after the season 4 finale, Bree and Katherine now own a successful catering company, with Andrew working as Bree's personal assistant. Bree is about to publish her own cookbook, but Katherine feels she gives her less credit than she deserves. It is revealed that years earlier, Danielle forcefully took Benjamin from Bree when she married Leo, an environmental lawyer. Lynette is having trouble controlling her now teenage twin sons Porter and Preston due to their latest antics, including turning Scavo Pizzeria into a casino. Gabrielle worries about her daughter Juanita's weight problem, which forces her to reflect on how her own appearance has changed over the years. A tragic car accident forced Susan and Mike apart when Susan's car crashed into Lila Dash's car, killing her and her daughter Paige. This resulted in Susan and Mike's divorce, after which Susan has custody of Maynard ("M.J."). Susan has a new lover, Jackson Braddock, to whom she refuses to commit because she feels she is not ready for a new relationship. Edie moves back to Wisteria Lane with a new husband, Dave, a man with a dark secret involving anger management issues.
89	2	"We're So Happy You're So Happy"	David Grossman	Alexandra Cunningham	October 5, 2008	15.69
Lynette pretends to be a teenage girl on a social networking site in order to reconnect with Porter, but it backfires when he falls in love with her alias and eventually discovers the truth. Susan does not like how fast Mike and Jackson are becoming friends and feels Jackson may start observing her from Mike's point of view. Gabrielle goes to drastic lengths to protect her social standing when she is uninvited from a party because Carlos massages the guests at the country club, but Carlos eventually helps her realize they are still happy despite their financial situation. As Bree's catering business skyrockets, her marriage to Orson suffers when she chooses her career over dealing with crucial marital tensions that have been unresolved since Orson returned home after turning himself in for running Mike over. Mrs. McCluskey asks for Katherine's help when she starts suspecting Dave of stealing Ida's cat, Toby, so that he could get her to apologize to Edie for insulting her.
90	3	"Kids Ain't Like Everybody Else"	Bethany Rooney	Joe Keenan	October 12, 2008	15.51
Bree is reunited with Benjamin after three years, only to find herself repulsed with Danielle's parenting techniques, such as raising Benjamin as a vegetarian. To prevent this, Bree secretly asks him to eat two hot dogs but Danielle finds out and leaves her. Orson gets angry at Bree for ruining Danielle's visit and blames her for Benjamin's departure. Susan and Gabrielle get into a brawl over their children when Susan discovers M.J. is being bullied by Juanita Solis. Gabrielle and Carlos sell their car and buy an old one from Andrew but find out that the car has a broken radiator and intend to get their money back from Andrew. Dave and Tom begin a garage band, despite Lynette's objections. Katherine and Mrs. McCluskey begin to dig deeper into Dave's past and decide to question Edie, but find out that Dave did not attend college because of an alcoholic father. Dave finds out about Mrs. McCluskey's determination to know about his background.
91	4	"Back in Business"	Scott Ellis	John Pardee & Joey Murphy	October 19, 2008	15.49
Bree's new cookbook makes Lynette jealous and she decides to help her with the ad campaign; Bree refuses and decides to go with the original campaign designed by Stu, an ad exec of Lynette's when she was working at Parcher & Murphy. Bree finds out that Orson lost his job three weeks earlier due to his criminal record and he asks her if he could join the catering company, but Katherine refuses to have him as a partner. However, Bree gives him the job when he gets sad and moves into the guest bedroom. Mike starts to think he plays a minimal role in M.J.'s life when he finds out Jackson taught him to ride his bike. Dave tries to control his rage by taking pills while he plots to make Mike join the garage band; he eventually rents Mike the Young house after buying it from the Hudsons, thanks to Edie. Gabrielle and Carlos tell Juanita all about the birds and the bees after she catches them having sex. Juanita passes this on to her friend Bethany, causing Bethany's mom to cancel all future playdates.
92	5	"Mirror, Mirror"	David Grossman	Jeff Greenstein	October 26, 2008	15.95
On the night of Mrs. McCluskey's 70th birthday party, the wives reflect on crucial events that have occurred over the last five years and led them to where they are today: Gabrielle had two "miracle" babies and asked Carlos to get a vasectomy because she decided not to have any more kids; Bree, a former alcoholic, began to drink again the night Orson left for prison, but Katherine helped her to move past it; Tom had a near-death experience that fueled a midlife crisis and his need to add a tinge of excitement and adventure to his life; Susan finalized her divorce with Mike and found herself in bed with her house painter, Jackson. In the present, Orson asks Bree to tell Katherine about his wanting to become a partner, but she refuses because she does not want to hurt Katherine's feelings. However, Orson tells Katherine, who decides to accept him as a partner in time. Gabrielle finds out Carlos did not have the vasectomy because he wants a son. Susan wants to keep her relationship with Jackson "physical and casual", but Jackson wants more in the relationship, leading to a break-up. Dave attempts to get rid of Mrs. McCluskey and her nosiness and tries to prove she is demented so that he can unleash the plans for his real agenda which are finally revealed.
93	6	"There's Always a Woman"	Matthew Diamond	John Paul Bullock III	November 2, 2008	15.93
Susan and Jackson decide to start over after their brief break-up. Bree decides to set Katherine up with one of their clients, Peter Hickey, but finds out he was Orson's cellmate in prison, who was serving time for organ trafficking. Katherine, upset over her date, ponders moving to Maryland with Dylan, but finds a friend in Mike. Mrs. McCluskey decides to find out what Dave is really up to and gets help from her sister, Roberta, who pulls a few records from her company, Teleshore. Mrs. Virginia Hildebrand bribes Carlos and Gabrielle to go to Paris with her along with their daughters for two months so that Carlos can be her personal massage therapist, because he gives her orgasms unintentionally when he rubs her back. Lynette starts suspecting that Tom is having an affair with Anne Schilling, Porter's friend Kirby's mother, but it is actually Porter who is sleeping with her.
94	7	"What More Do I Need?"	Larry Shaw	Matt Berry	November 9, 2008	15.85
Lynette and Tom discover that Porter is having an affair with Anne, who is supposedly married to a husband who abuses her, and ask their son to end the affair. However, Porter discovers that Anne is pregnant and decides to run away with her without telling his parents. Gabrielle thinks Virginia is becoming too close for comfort and asks her to stop all the weekend visits; Virginia is angered and uses her contacts to make Carlos lose his job for inappropriate physical contact. Roberta and Mrs. McCluskey find out that Dave receives psychiatric treatment from Dr. Heller, who specializes in treating the criminally insane. They call him for information only to arouse his suspicions. Bree and Orson fire one of their employees, Charlie, for stealing money to buy pot. They later have sex in the kitchen, but discover that Charlie stole the surveillance tape to blackmail them. Andrew gets his hands on the tape and the Hodge family discovers that the tape showed Katherine and Mike having sex. Susan and Jackson start dating again, intending to not have sex until the fourth date. They change their minds on the third date when Susan finds out Jackson really loves her.
95	8	"City on Fire"	David Grossman	Bob Daily	November 16, 2008	16.84
Everyone gathers at the White Horse Club to attend the "Battle Of The Bands" where the band is performing. Julie visits Susan with her much older boyfriend who has been divorced thrice. When he proposes to her, Julie refuses, which makes Susan learn that her daughter does not believe in marriage because of the consequences of her own mother's marriages. A reporter tries to dig up dirt on Bree to include it in a review of Bree's cookbook. Virginia gives Carlos his job back and adds both Carlos and Gabrielle to her will, making them sole heirs of her fortune. Gabrielle refuses because she becomes sick of Virginia pushing herself into their lives. Lynette talks to Anne about the baby, but protects her when she witnesses her husband, Warren, beat her until she bleeds. Porter blames Lynette for Anne's condition, and steals a gun to shoot Warren for hurting Anne. Dr. Heller comes to Fairview seeking answers from Dave and reveals that Dave has something to do with Mike. Dave murders Dr. Heller and starts a fire, but locks Jackson in the bathroom when he witnesses him coming out of the storage room. Jackson escapes and Mike falls into the loop unconscious. Dave saves Mike for ulterior motives and is branded a hero, while Warren blames Porter for starting the fire. Carlos and Orson get badly injured along with Mike and are sent to the hospital.
96	9	"Me and My Town"	David Warren	Lori Kirkland Baker	November 30, 2008	15.81
Gabrielle finds out Carlos can gain back his sight thanks to the injuries he suffered in the stampede of the nightclub. Thinking that Carlos may not find her beautiful anymore, Gabrielle takes drastic measures to regain her figure. Susan decides to let go of Mike when she learns of Katherine and Mike's relationship. Bree asks Orson to undergo a surgery of his injured septum which causes him to snore loudly, but Orson decides to drug Bree with sleeping pills, which causes her to almost miss her cooking demonstration where she pulls off a dramatic scene. Lynette uses an emergency fund without telling Tom in order to bribe Anne into leaving town and never contact Porter again, leading her to discover that she faked the pregnancy. Dave starts feeling guilty about the seven deaths caused by the fire he started and decides to pin the blame on Porter, who was already under suspicion by the police because Porter had threatened to kill Warren at the nightclub. It is revealed that Andrew is in a live-in relationship with Orson's plastic surgeon, Alex.
97	10	"A Vision's Just a Vision"	Larry Shaw	David Flebotte	December 7, 2008	16.09
When Porter gets arrested, Lynette hires Bob as Porter's lawyer and finds out that Porter stole a gun from Edie. Lynette secretly returns the gun after removing Porter's fingerprints, still hiding from Tom the fact that she used up his emergency fund. Porter skips town after his bail is posted when he is threatened by Warren, causing Preston to take his place in court. Carlos realizes the extent of Gabrielle's sacrifices for their family once his sight returns and decides to make it up to her for the rest of his life. Bree finds out Andrew is dating Alex and invites them to dinner where she discovers that Bob and Lee recognize Alex from a gay porn movie. Bree confronts Andrew with this, but is happy to find out that Andrew already knows about it and still wants to marry Alex. M.J. starts to attack Katherine when he thinks that Katherine may be getting in the way of his parents getting back together. This causes Susan and Mike to realize that they may never get back together. Dave starts to lose his grip on reality and sees visions of his first wife and daughter, who were Lila and Paige Dash, and he swears to take revenge on Mike for "killing" them.
98	11	"Home Is the Place"	David Grossman	Jamie Gorenberg	January 4, 2009	14.39
Bree and Alex's mother, Melina, compete for Alex and Andrew's affections, and when Bree feels that Melina is plotting to make them move to Oakdale, she buys the boys a nice house from Edie on Wisteria Lane to keep them nearby. Gabrielle urges Carlos to take a six-figure job to support the family, even though it means spending more time away from home, but he wants to take a job at the community center to help the blind. Susan turns to Lee for company while Jackson is away and Lee makes her realize that she may not be ready to commit to Jackson. Bob finds out that Porter has run away and gives Lynette and Tom two days to find him before he reports to the district attorney. Lynette finds out that Preston had been secretly talking to Porter and she tries to convince him to come back. They could lose their pizzeria if they have to forfeit his bail; they are unaware that he is staying with Stella. Edie grows weary of Dave, whose strange behavior has not abated; she catches him mumbling to the ghosts of Lila and Paige. She throws him out of the house when she finds out he lied to her about his first marriage. Mrs. McCluskey and Roberta contact Dr. Heller's office again to find out about Dave but discover that Dr. Heller has not returned for a week. Dave also contacts his office to get medicine delivered to Wisteria Lane and reveals that his real name is David Dash.
99	12	"Connect! Connect!"	Ken Whittingham	Jordon Nardino	January 11, 2009	13.79
Alex objects to the way Bree criticizes her family and decides to give back the house she bought for him and Andrew. He ultimately re-accepts it when Bree tells him about how she has become insensitive to others since her business flourished and she would not mind if he corrected her. Gabrielle takes desperate measures to control her children when they stop listening to her while Carlos is busy at his new workplace. Lynette discovers that Stella is hiding Porter to get back at Lynette for leaving her in a nursing home three years earlier, but convinces Porter to return. Lynette also decides to visit her mother on a regular basis to rekindle their relationship. Susan and Edie are forced to spend time alone together when they accidentally lock themselves in a basement. Susan makes Edie realize that she commits to brief relationships with men because of how her father betrayed her during her childhood, while Edie does the same by making Susan feel that she is always in need of men so that she can depend on them. This causes both of them to make important decisions — Susan decides to become independent and refuses to move in with Jackson, while Edie asks Dave, who had moved in with Mike and had come one step closer to exacting revenge, to come back.
100	13	"The Best Thing That Ever Could Have Happened"	Larry Shaw	Marc Cherry & Bob Daily	January 18, 2009	13.08
When neighborhood handyman, Eli Scruggs, dies, the residents of Wisteria Lane come to realize just how much he affected their lives. Gabrielle recalls how Eli helped her make new friends when she moved in. Lynette remembers how he came to her aid when she was overwhelmed with her new job and unintentionally neglecting a newborn Penny. Susan reflects on how he was always there for her as a shoulder to cry on each time a man walked out of her life. Edie looks back on the special bond they formed after her second husband, Umberto, left her for a man. Bree thinks fondly of how a small gesture he once made inspired her to write a cookbook and get her to where she is today. Mary Alice narrates how she had inspired Eli to help others by helping him in his time of need, the day she committed suicide.
101	14	"Mama Spent Money When She Had None"	David Warren	Jason Ganzel	February 8, 2009	13.82
Susan is envious when she discovers Mike has bought Katherine new pearls yet says he cannot afford to pay for M.J.'s private school, Oakridge Academy. She steals Katherine's pearls which Mike confesses to both of them are fake as he could not afford them. To pay for M.J.'s education, Susan gets a job at Oakridge to get a 50% discount on tuition. Bree reaps the rewards of her book by buying a car and giving Lynette and Tom $20,000 to help with their financial troubles after posting Porter's bail. Lynette and Tom have a fire sale for their pizzeria as they are planning on selling it, and also to thank Bree for her generosity. They discover that Bree may never let them forget how "generous" she has been, which causes a rift in their friendship. Bob, Porter's lawyer, tells Lee about Dave being the one who pinned Porter for the fire, who in turn tells Tom, causing Tom and Dave to fight. Prompted to lose weight, both Gabrielle and Edie attend a fitness boot camp, but Gabrielle leaves it only to be reminded by Edie that she is turning into the self-centered obnoxious woman she used to be, inspiring her to change for the better.
102	15	"In a World Where the Kings Are Employers"	David Grossman	Lori Kirkland Baker	February 15, 2009	14.01
Because of Susan's new job at Oakridge, Mike has to take care of M.J., but he drops him off at Katherine's, whose delicious recipes and care start making M.J. feel that Katherine's house is more fun than Susan's. When Susan discovers this, she confronts Katherine and tells her to stay away from her son. Katherine tells Susan that Mike is moving in with her and hence, she will be seeing more of M.J. Lynette tells Tom they have to sell Scavo Pizzeria when it continues to suffer economically, coupled with having to pay Porter's hefty bail, but Tom comes up with a plan to replace his employees with his kids. They refuse to appreciate his work, causing him to pour out his anger over not being able to live his pizza dream. Carlos's boss, Bradley Scott, gives Carlos a huge bonus when Gabrielle sees Bradley having an affair, but Gabrielle starts feeling guilty over not telling Bradley's wife, Maria, who names her and Carlos as their unborn child's godparents. When Orson learns Bree has given Andrew a raise twice as much as his own salary so that he can afford a new life with Alex, he feels jealous and unappreciated and steals Andrew's Montblanc pen. It is revealed that Dave had stolen Dr. Heller's phone to message his suspicious secretary about the "leave" while he plans a camping trip with Mike and Katherine.
103	16	"Crime Doesn't Pay"	Larry Shaw	Jamie Gorenberg	March 8, 2009	13.65
In a gesture of friendship, Bree tells Lynette she will help Tom secure a new job from an advertising executive named Bruce as they have sold their restaurant, but the tension heats up when Lynette and Tom compete over the new job, leading neither of them to get it. Orson starts behaving like a kleptomaniac, stealing from people who are rude to him; he steals from Tom when he rejects his help, then Bruce who behaves rudely to him, and then Bree, who catches him stealing and tells him to stop. Bradley begins to use Gabrielle as to cover for him as he continues to cheat on his wife, leading her to threaten to reveal his secret to Maria. Bradley decides to fire Carlos and tell Maria himself, but she stabs him in the back, leading to her arrest. When Mike moves in with Katherine, she hides Susan's beach painting, which was a honeymoon gift to Mike, so that she is not reminded of Mike's relationship with her. Edie starts digging up Dave's past by catching up with a priest who is an acquaintance of his and finds out his real name is David Dash.
104	17	"The Story of Lucy and Jessie"	Bethany Rooney	Jordon Nardino	March 15, 2009	14.60
Susan tries to be friendly with Jessie, her boss at Oakridge, so that she gets a good evaluation, but freaks out when her friendliness gets translated into romance by Jessie, who is a lesbian. Edie looks for information in the newspaper on the people who died in Mike's car accident and discovers that it was Lila and Paige Dash, Dave's wife and daughter. Edie confirms that Paige really was his daughter when she asks Dave if he wants a child but he refuses. Dave convinces Katherine to join them camping because he wants to exact revenge on anyone whom Mike loves. Bree secretly returns everything Orson stole from his neighbors, but forces him to talk to a psychiatrist when she feels Orson's kleptomania has some link to her. Orson confesses he likes stealing because that is something Bree cannot control. Carlos gets a promotion, which will lead to him working with Lucy, an overweight woman in her late 30s who is Carlos's ex-girlfriend, forcing Gabrielle to provide Lynette a job at Carlos's company so that she can spy on him.
105	18	"A Spark. To Pierce the Dark."	David Grossman	Alexandra Cunningham	March 22, 2009	14.75
Lynette is threatened by her new boss, Lucy, when she makes her work permanently on Friday nights, preventing her from coaching Penny's basketball team. Carlos fires Lucy after realizing that she is a rude and demeaning woman. Bree finds out that Orson is committing theft to hurt her, and that she is unintentionally emasculating him by being the breadwinner of the house. She plans on selling her company, but decides not to when Andrew makes her realize that she should make herself happy by continuing her business. Susan discovers that Karl's son Evan, has psychological issues because his mother, Marisa, left Karl after the birth. Dave plans to kill Katherine with a hunting rifle during Mike and Katherine's romantic hike so that Mike mourns her loss forever, but his plans fail when Edie confronts him, having discovered from a newspaper article that Mike was the one who killed Dave's family in the accident. Edie runs away in her car after Dave tries to strangle her for trying to tell Mike the truth. While driving away, Edie nearly hits Orson, who is running away after stealing from a neighbor, Rose Kemper; she steers her car to miss him and crashes into an electric pole, resulting in an electric shock that kills her.
106	19	"Look Into Their Eyes and You See What They Know"	Larry Shaw	Matt Berry	April 19, 2009	13.85
The episode is narrated by Nicollette Sheridan as the late Edie Britt, as the wives take a road trip to give Edie's ashes to Travers and inform him of her death. The housewives reminisce about the special times they shared with Edie: Susan recalled how Edie and she had started as friends while sniping at each other when Edie discovered Karl was cheating on her with Brandy; Lynette remembers how Edie helped inspire her to battle cancer and not be weak and mourn; Bree reflects on how Edie taught her a valuable moral lesson when she told her to support Orson while he was in jail irrespective of how humiliating it might be; and Gabrielle recounts a friendly competition she had with Edie at a bar over finding out who was sexier but Edie lost, resulting in her confessing to Gaby how she always will miss her youth when she dies. Travers refuses to take Edie's ashes because she was not a good mother, but is told by Mrs. McCluskey a tale of how Edie had told her that she gave Travers away only to provide him with the best. The wives distribute Edie's ashes all over Wisteria Lane.
107	20	"Rose's Turn"	David Warren	Dave Flebotte	April 26, 2009	13.64
Susan tries to console Dave after Edie's death by telling him about her and Mike's car accident; she reveals that she was driving the car, not Mike, and felt incredibly guilty after killing Lila and Paige. Realizing he is targeting the wrong resident, Dave plans on killing M.J. to hurt Susan. Orson tries to hide the crime he committed in Rose Kemper's house by telling the hospital authorities that she has dementia, but Bree finds out indirectly from Katherine about the theft and asks Andrew for help. Katherine desperately tries to hide her need of commitment from Mike, who starts feeling that everything can vanish in a moment after Edie's death. Tom, Gabrielle, Lynette and Carlos have a friendly argument when Gabrielle catches Tom hanging out with Patty Rizzo, the slut, even though she told him not to. Carlos sees Lynette naked when she falls in her bathtub and loses consciousness, but he saves her, resulting in insecurity issues from Tom.
108	21	"Bargaining"	David Grossman	David Schladweiler	May 3, 2009	13.49
Juanita starts wearing make-up, which prompts Gabrielle to teach her a lesson about inner beauty; Gabrielle breaks the boundaries herself when she desires make-up at an event involving the mayor of Fairview. Gabrielle promises Juanita that she can beautify her outer self when she is done beautifying her "inner gooey center". Bree decides to divorce Orson, but her search for a divorce lawyer that can help her keep her cookbook company safe from Orson's hands leads to Karl, who promises to help her if she can get M.J. to invite Evan for a sleepover party that Mike and Katherine are planning. Katherine tries to trick Mike into committing to her because she is scared he may walk out of her life anytime, but discovers that Mike may not be ready for a complicated decision about his future. Dave plans on taking Susan and M.J. on a boat trip where he intends to drown M.J. and decides to hurry up when the police identify the burn victim in the nightclub as Dr. Heller. Susan, however, delays Dave's plans when she plans to marry Jackson to help him get a green card. Lynette and Tom make a pact to have sex for 30 consecutive days, but Lynette accidentally breaks the streak after she falls asleep due to stress at work. She ends up discovering that Tom is unhappy because he has no aim in his life.
109	22	"Marry Me a Little"	Larry Shaw	Jason Ganzel	May 10, 2009	12.29
Gabrielle wants Juanita to volunteer for the church soup kitchen when she appears to be ungrateful and acts like a spoiled brat. Gabrielle runs into an old housewife, Fran, who is now poor because of her husband's death, forcing Gabrielle to realize that she may, again, face financial troubles. Susan cancels her and M.J.'s boating and fishing plans with Dave, much to Dave's dismay. Mike asks Katherine to marry him when he sees Susan and Jackson getting ready to plan their fake marriage. Susan tells Katherine why she is marrying Jackson and that she would still be needing the alimony from Mike, but Katherine hides this from Mike because she is worried he may not feel like marrying her if Susan's wedding is canceled. Dave overhears this conversation and calls an immigration agent who arrests Jackson for being an illegal immigrant from Canada. Bree and Karl decide to hide her assets from Orson to prevent him from claiming it after divorce by doing some creative accounting, open secret bank accounts and staging a robbery in Bree's house to hide her personal belongings. Things go horribly wrong when Orson comes across the storage unit where Bree is hiding her "stolen" belongings.
110 111	23 24	"Everybody Says Don't If It's Only In Your Head"	Bethany Rooney David Grossman	John Pardee & Joey Murphy Jeffrey Richman	May 17, 2009	13.96
Gabrielle is upset when she and the kids visit Carlos's family and are asked by his Aunt Connie to take in her troubled and secretive niece, Ana Solis. Lynette seeks to foil Tom's plans to learn Chinese by returning to college, only to learn too late that he wanted to learn to speak Chinese in order to earn more money in advertising. Bree comes clean to Orson about wanting a divorce when he restores the "stolen" belongings from the storage unit. Orson threatens to blackmail Bree by reporting her for insurance fraud if she goes through with the divorce because he had already claimed insurance on the robbed stuff that was apparently stolen. Jackson suspects Mike for sending the anonymous tip that got him detained, while detectives question him and learn that he saw Dave Williams coming out of the storage room on the night of the fire in the club. The detectives inform Dr. Heller's receptionist, Claire, about the identification of his dead body in the nightclub; Claire, in turn, contacts Roberta, who plans on breaking into Dave's house with her sister to obtain evidence. Dave learns that the police are planning to use Dr. Heller's phone against him and plans on killing M.J. immediately. Susan agrees to go with Dave after learning that Katherine never informed Mike about Susan's marriage being fake because she felt he still has not gotten over her. While Tom is excited about getting admitted to college again for a major in Chinese, Lynette discovers that she is pregnant and may give birth to twins again, causing a major disruption in both Tom and Lynette's careers. Ana moves into the Solis home and immediately goes head to head with Gabrielle. Bree finds out that Karl sent a man to assault Orson for threatening her with blackmail; when Bree confronts Karl, they end up making love. Mike discovers the crime Dave plans on committing and leaves Katherine alone at the airport to save his son and ex-wife. Susan and M.J. try to run away from Dave when they are informed by Mike, but Dave catches them and explains to Susan how M.J. will be killed in a "poetic" way when Mike will crash into Dave's car, killing M.J. on the same road where his daughter and wife died. However, as Mike's car approaches, Dave looks back at innocent M.J. and sees the face of his daughter. Mike crashes into Dave's car, but M.J. is standing out on the curb, unharmed. Mrs. McCluskey and Roberta are caught by the detectives in Dave's house; together, they crack the case when they find out about Dave's real name, David Dash. Dave is admitted to Boston Ridgegate Mental Hospital. In the episode's final moments, a wedding between Mike Delfino and a mystery woman takes place two months later.

== Ratings ==
=== United States ===
Episode number Production number	Title	Original airing	Rating	Share	18-49	Total viewers (in millions)	Rank per week
88; 5-01	You're Gonna Love Tomorrow	September 28, 2008	11.4	17	7.1	18.684	#2
89; 5-02	We're So Happy You're So Happy	October 5, 2008	10.0	15	5.8	15.685	#4
90; 5-03	Kids Ain't Like Everybody Else	October 12, 2008	9.8	15	5.9	15.505	#6
91; 5-04	Back in Business	October 19, 2008	9.7	14	5.7	15.485	#3
92; 5-05	Mirror, Mirror	October 26, 2008	10.1	15	5.8	15.953	#5
93; 5-06	There's Always a Woman	November 2, 2008	10.1	15	5.8	15.933	#8
94; 5-07	What More Do I Need?	November 9, 2008	10.1	15	5.9	15.854	#5
95; 5-08	City on Fire	November 16, 2008	10.3	15	6.2	16.842	#6
96; 5-09	Me and My Town	November 30, 2008	9.9	15	5.7	15.814	#7
97; 5-10	A Vision's Just a Vision	December 7, 2008	9.9	15	6.0	16.088	#5
98; 5-11	Home Is the Place	January 4, 2009	8.8	13	5.2	14.394	#4
99; 5-12	Connect! Connect!	January 11, 2009	8.5	12	5.2	13.787	#10
100; 5-13	The Best Thing That Ever Could Have Happened	January 18, 2009	8.3	12	4.6	13.082	#15
101; 5-14	Mama Spent Money When She Had None	February 8, 2009	8.6	13	4.9	13.823	#11
102; 5-15	In a World Where the Kings Are Employers	February 15, 2009	8.7	13	4.9	14.010	#10
103; 5-16	Crime Doesn't Pay	March 8, 2009	8.7	13	4.7	13.646	#9
104; 5-17	The Story of Lucy and Jessie	March 15, 2009	9.1	14	5.1	14.602	#5
105; 5-18	A Spark. To Pierce the Dark.	March 22, 2009	9.2	14	5.0	14.748	#7
106; 5-19	Look Into Their Eyes and You See What They Know	April 19, 2009	8.6	13	4.8	13.851	#7
107; 5-20	Rose's Turn	April 26, 2009	8.5	13	4.7	13.642	#7
108; 5-21	Bargaining	May 3, 2009	8.4	13	4.4	13.485	#11
109; 5-22	Marry Me a Little	May 10, 2009	7.7	12	4.1	12.293	#13
110; 5-23	Everybody Says Don't	May 17, 2009	8.7	14	4.7	13.956	#9
111; 5-24	If It's Only In Your Head	May 17, 2009	8.7	14	4.7	13.956	#9

=== United Kingdom ===
Episode number	Title	Original airing on Channel 4	Time of airing on Channel 4	Original airing on E4	Time of airing on E4	Position in Channel 4 and Channel 4+1's ratings	Position in E4 and E4+1's ratings	Total viewers
88	You're Gonna Love Tomorrow	22 October 2008	10:00 pm – 11:00 pm	19 October 2008	10:00 pm – 11:00 pm	2.39m	639,900	2,949,900
89	We're So Happy You're So Happy	29 October 2008	10:00 pm – 11:00 pm	26 October 2008	10:00 pm – 11:00 pm	1.88m	577,400	2,377,400
90	Kids Ain't Like Everybody Else	5 November 2008	10:00 pm – 11:00 pm	2 November 2008	10:00 pm – 11:00 pm	1.97m	654,700	2,534,700
91	Back in Business	12 November 2008	10:00 pm – 11:00 pm	9 November 2008	10:00 pm – 11:00 pm	1.77m	615,800	2,393,800
92	Mirror, Mirror	19 November 2008	10:20 pm – 11:05 pm	16 November 2008	10:00 pm – 11:00 pm	1.77m	525,900	2,295,900
93	There's Always a Woman	26 November 2008	10:10 pm – 11:10 pm	23 November 2008	10:00 pm – 11:00 pm	1.77m	761,100	2,435,100
94	What More Do I Need?	30 November 2008	10:10 pm – 11:10 pm	30 November 2008	10:00 pm – 11:00 pm	1.74	552,600	2,292,600
95	City on Fire	10 December 2008	10:05 pm – 11:05 pm	7 December 2008	10:00 pm – 11:00 pm	1.73m	601,900	2,331,900
96	Me and My Town	17 December 2008	10:00 pm – 11:00 pm	14 December 2008	10:00 pm – 11:00 pm	1.76m	1.0m	2,760,200
97	A Vision's Just a Vision	25 February 2009	10:00 pm – 11:00 pm	1 March 2009	9:00 pm – 10:00 pm	2.65m	190,500	2,840,500
98	Home Is the Place	4 March 2009	10:00 pm – 11:00 pm	1 March 2009	10:00 pm – 11:00 pm	2.01m	520,700	2,530,700
99	Connect! Connect!	11 March 2009	10:00 pm – 11:00 pm	8 March 2009	10:00 pm – 11:00 pm	1.87m	460,700	2,330,700
100	The Best Thing That Ever Could Have Happened	18 March 2009	10:00 pm – 11:00 pm	15 March 2009	10:00 pm – 11:00 pm	2.05m	503,600	2,553,600
101	Mama Spent Money When She Had None	25 March 2009	10:00 pm – 11:00 pm	22 March 2009	10:00 pm – 11:00 pm	1.95m	465,900	2,395,900
102	In a World Where the Kings Are Employers	1 April 2009	10:00 pm – 11:00 pm	29 March 2009	10:00 pm – 11:00 pm	1.91m	620,000	2,530,000
103	Crime Doesn't Pay	8 April 2009	10:00 pm – 11:00 pm	5 April 2009	10:00 pm – 11:00 pm	1.81m	623,700	2,433,000
104	The Story of Lucy and Jessie	15 April 2009	10:00 pm – 11:00 pm	12 April 2009	10:00 pm – 11:00 pm	1.94m	622,800	2,563,000
105	A Spark. To Pierce the Dark.	22 April 2009	10:00 pm – 11:00 pm	19 April 2009	10:00 pm – 11:00 pm	1.88m	674,300	2,554,000
106	Look Into Their Eyes and You See What They Know	29 April 2009	10:00 pm – 11:00 pm	26 April 2009	10:00 pm – 11:00 pm	1.83m	744,900	2,575,000
107	Rose's Turn	6 May 2009	10:00 pm – 11:00 pm	3 May 2009	10:00 pm – 11:00 pm	2.03m	703,100	2,733,100
108	Bargaining	13 May 2009	10:00 pm – 11:00 pm	10 May 2009	10:00 pm – 11:00 pm	2.03m	555,100	2.58m
109	Marry Me a Little	20 May 2009	10:00 pm – 11:00 pm	17 May 2009	10:00 pm – 11:00 pm	1.76m	529,400	2.28m
110	Everybody Says Don't	27 May 2009	10:00 pm – 11:00 pm	24 May 2009	10:00 pm – 11:00 pm	1.87m	523,600	2.39m
111	If It's Only In Your Head	3 June 2009	10:00 pm – 11:00 pm	31 May 2009	10:00 pm – 11:00 pm	1.87m	780,200	2,650,200

=== Republic of Ireland on RTÉ 2 ===
- Desperate Housewives airs Tuesdays at 9:55 pm on RTÉ 2 in Ireland.
- All ratings below are supplied from the RTÉ Guide TV guide. The ratings are supplied by TAM Ireland/Nielsen TAM.
- Out of the 19 episodes of ratings available, season 5 averaged approx. 409,000 viewers. (Please note 19 out of the 24 episodes ratings are available.).

Episode number	Title	Air Date	Timeslot	Viewers	Rank
88	You're Gonna Love Tomorrow	14 October 2008	9:55 pm	-	-
89	We're So Happy You're So Happy	21 October 2008	9:55 pm	-	-
90	Kids Ain't Like Everybody Else	28 October 2008	9:55 pm	-	-
91	Back in Business	4 November 2008	9:55 pm	540,000	#1
92	Mirror, Mirror	11 November 2008	9:55 pm	452,000	#1
93	There's Always a Woman	18 November 2008	9:55 pm	421,000	#3
94	What More Do I Need?	25 November 2008	9:55 pm	453,000	#1
95	City on Fire	2 December 2008	9:55 pm	421,000	#1
96	Me and My Town	9 December 2008	9:55 pm	392,000	#1
97	A Vision's Just a Vision	16 December 2008	9:55 pm	-	-
98	Home is the Place	13 January 2009	9:55 pm	395,000	#1
99	Connect! Connect!	20 January 2009	9:55 pm	384,000	#1
100	The Best Thing That Ever Could Have Happened	27 January 2009	9:55 pm	420,000	#1
101	Mama Spent Money When She Had None	10 February 2009	9:55 pm	368,000	#3
102	In a World Where the Kings Are Employers	17 February 2009	9:55 pm	366,000	#1
103	Crime Doesn't Pay	March 10, 2009	9:55 pm	426,000	#1
104	The Story of Lucy and Jessie	March 17, 2009	9:55 pm	308,000	#4
105	A Spark. To Pierce the Dark.	March 24, 2009	9:55 pm	410,000	#1
106	Look Into Their Eyes and You See What They Know	April 21, 2009	9:55 pm	388,000	#1
107	Rose's Turn	April 28, 2009	9:55 pm	-	-
108	Bargaining	May 5, 2009	9:55 pm	416,000	#1
109	Marry Me a Little	May 12, 2009	9:55 pm	344,000	#2
110	Everybody Says Don't	May 19, 2009	9:00 pm	379,000	#2
111	If It's Only In Your Head	May 19, 2009	9:55 pm	490,000	#1

== DVD release ==
The fifth season was officially released on DVD in region 1 on September 1, 2008, under the title Desperate Housewives: The Complete Fifth Season – The Red Hot Edition, the box-set contained 7 discs, with all 24 episodes from the season being packed between the first 6 discs along with a couple of audio commentaries on selected episodes as bonus features. Disc 7 included only the rest of the features, including interviews with cast and crew members on the show's 100th. Episode, behind-the-scenes footage, unaired and alternate scenes cut from the aired episodes and bloopers. The same set was also released on region 2 and region 4 on November 11, 2009 and October 21, 2009, respectively.

For the United States, a special limited box set edition of the season was released exclusively for Best Buy, this box set included an alternate artwork and an extra disc with over 20 minutes of additional bonus content, including more unaired scenes of the season that were missed from the standard set and additional behind-the-scenes footage. The set also had a limited release on region 4 for Mexico & South America, however, the bonus disc or the additional features were not included, only the alternate artwork.

Desperate Housewives: The Complete Fifth Season (The Red Hot Edition)
Set details	Special features	
24 Episodes; 7-Disc Set; 1.78:1 aspect ratio; English (Dolby Digital 5.1 Surround); Subtitles: English SDH, Spanish & French; Audio Commentaries; Runtime: 1033 minutes	Audio Commentaries on 2 episodes: "You're Gonna Love Tomorrow" by director Larry Shaw and actors Doug Savant, Kyle MacLachlan & James Denton.; "The Best Thing That Ever Could Have Happened" with creator & co-writer Marc Cherry and actress Brenda Strong.; "What More Do I Need?": A Very Good Read - A behind-the-scenes look at how the process unfolds from script to screen.; I Know Things Now: Desperate Housewives Celebrates 100 Episodes - A look back at 100 episodes of comedy, drama and cake fights.; So Very Teri - Spend the afternoon with Wisteria Lane's favorite girl next door.; Cherry-Picked: Creator Marc Cherry's Favourite Scenes; Bloopers; Deleted Scenes; Bonus disc exclusive features: Wisteria Lane Mysterie Club - An exclusive behind-the-scenes with the actors who play Wisteria Lane's mysterious characters who add to the drama of the series.; A Day with Karen and Roberta - Exclusive behind-the-scenes with Lily Tomlin and Kathryn Joosten; Additional deleted scenes	
DVD release dates
Region 1	Region 2	Region 4
September 1, 2009	November 9, 2009	October 21, 2009
