= Edie Britt =

Fictional character on Desperate Housewives

- Desperate Housewives character
- Nicollette Sheridan as Edie Britt
- Portrayed by: Nicollette Sheridan
- Duration: 2004–09
- First appearance: "Pilot"; 1x01, October 3, 2004
- Last appearance: "Everybody Says Don't"; 5x23, May 17, 2009
- Created by: Marc Cherry
In-universe information
- Other names: Edie Williams (married name)
- Occupation: Real estate agent
- Mother: Ilene Britt (deceased) Charles McLain (m. 1996; div. 1999) Umberto Roswell (m. 2002; div. 2004) Dave Williams (m. 2012)
- Sons: Travers McLain
- Nephews: Austin McCann
- Other relatives: Benjamin Tyson Katz (great-nephew)

Edie Britt is a fictional character created by television producer and screenwriter Marc Cherry for the ABC television series Desperate Housewives. Nicollette Sheridan portrayed Edie from her debut in the pilot episode of the series until the character's death in the fifth season.

Within the series, Edie lived at 4362 Wisteria Lane in Fairview. Edie was a real estate agent. She was married three times; to Charles McLain (with whom she had a son, Travers), Umberto Rothwell, and Dave Williams. Throughout her time on the series, she also had numerous relationships with the ex-husbands or former lovers of other characters.

Sheridan's portrayal of the character has been received with critical acclaim, and earned her a nomination for the Golden Globe Award for Best Supporting Actress.

== Development and casting ==
At the end of the reading, the director looked at me and said, "No, no, I see you as Edie." I said, "Oh, I see, I come in a housewife and mother of two and leave the slut."

— Nicollette Sheridan on her audition
for Bree Van de Kamp

The character Edie Britt was a series regular for the first 5 seasons, despite originally being conceived as a recurring character. Actress Nicollette Sheridan, who originally auditioned for Bree Van de Kamp, one of the series' more prominent roles, was cast in the role in February 2004. On August 11, Sheridan was announced to have joined the main cast for the series' first season, the thirteenth regular cast member to do so. Despite proving popular with fans and critics, Sheridan's role remained somewhat minimal in the series' first two seasons. Series creator Marc Cherry insisted that Edie served "only as a spoiler to complicate the other women's lives." Although Sheridan thought of Edie as the fifth main housewife—in addition to Susan Mayer, Bree Van De Kamp, Lynette Scavo, and Gabrielle Solis—the opening credits only pictured the other four women. Additionally, Cherry shared that his goal was to have the central four women remain in the series.

However, Marcia Cross' maternity leave caused Bree to be written out of the later part of the third season. Edie's character was elevated in prominence, providing the fourth concurrent storyline for the episodes. During this time, the character's "layers are peeled away and the character is developed on a deeper level than has been previously explored." Despite Cross' return, Edie maintained a more important role throughout seasons four and five until the character's death.

=== Departure ===
In February 2009, it was announced that Sheridan would be leaving the show following her character's death, which would involve a car accident and electrical wire. Cherry had confirmed the death of several fan favorites at the beginning of the series' fifth season in September 2008. Rumors of on-set problems with Sheridan and her squabbles with Cherry reportedly led to her departure. Sheridan commented that killing Edie "was a risky decision that could have devastating ramifications," and admitted to feeling ignored by Cherry while on the series. Cherry alleges that the reason behind Edie's death was to cut costs from the series. The series reportedly saved an estimated $100,000 to $200,000 per episode without the cost of Sheridan's salary. In April 2010, Sheridan filed a lawsuit against Cherry, alleging wrongful dismissal and assault and battery, among five other counts. The following June, Sheridan filed an amended claim, clarifying that the alleged assault was a "light tap," but reaffirmed her stance that her contract was wrongfully terminated.

On August 7, 2011, after the announcement that Desperate Housewives would be concluding at the end of its 8th season, Marc Cherry hinted that he may ask Nicollette Sheridan back for the series finale, "to pay homage to everyone who has been on the show", including Edie and without addressing Sheridan's lawsuit. However, while being interviewed on NBC's Today the following day, the actress firmly denied her comeback on Wisteria Lane, saying "That's news to me. [...] I had an amazing time playing that character. I loved her dearly, but they killed her! She's dead."

== Storylines ==
=== Past ===
Edie Britt was born in 1967. Her father left her mother for another woman with a daughter when Edie was 16 years old. Edie has a sister, and brother who died from a drug overdose. When Edie's mother, Ilene (K Callan), got put in prison, the Britt siblings lived with a tough woman, curator Mrs. Muntz, until she was released. As a teenager, Edie spent her time with the "freaks" hanging out by the loading docks, where she would smoke with them. Ilene died when Edie was an adult.

She married Dr. Charles McLain (Greg Evigan), with whom she had a son, Travers (Jake Cherry), in 1998. After their divorce, she gave Travers up to his father, but they agreed to visitation. In 2002 she married gym instructor Umberto Rothwell (Matt Cedeño). In 2003 they moved to 4360 Wisteria Lane, and the couple divorced one year later, after she found out that he is gay.

=== Season 1 ===
Edie is introduced as a divorcée, having been married twice before. Edie and Susan Mayer are both attracted to new neighbor Mike Delfino (James Denton), creating tension between them which culminates in Susan accidentally burning down Edie's house. Later, Edie is upset when Martha is murdered and proves to be the only Wisteria Lane resident who wants to give her a proper burial. After Susan admits to Edie that she burned her house down, she uses Susan's guilt to join the housewives' poker group.

=== Season 2 ===
Edie starts dating Karl, Susan's ex-husband, causing fights between the two women. Edie later discovers a wedding ring in Karl's briefcase and while she suspects Karl plans to propose, but discovers the ring is for an insurance fraud scheme with Susan. He proposes after being told she knew about the scam, and she punishes Karl and Susan by deciding they will throw her a lavish wedding. However, Karl abruptly leaves her, and Edie discovers that Karl had slept with another woman, unaware it is Susan. Edie is extremely upset and Susan, feeling guilty for unknowingly being "the other woman", tries to make her feel better. Eventually, Susan writes Edie a confession letter admitting the truth. Feeling betrayed, Edie retaliates by burning down Susan's house. After discovering Edie was responsible, Susan tries to get a confession out of her whilst wearing a wire, leading to a fight when Edie realizes. Trying to catch Susan, Edie is badly stung by yellowjackets. Susan feels guilty when Edie is hospitalized and tells her she won't give the confession to the police, sparing Edie prison. Edie refuses to accept Susan's pity and vows to get revenge.

=== Season 3 ===
Edie declines Susan's attempts to rebuild a friendship, and is present when Mike wakes up from his coma and learns that he has retrograde amnesia and has forgotten the last two years. Edie manipulates Mike into a relationship, lying about Susan and his life with her, but ends it when Mike is arrested for the murder.

Later, Edie's nephew, Austin McCann (Josh Henderson) briefly lives with her.

Edie's son, Travers, is dropped off by his father for a month-long visit. Carlos Solis develops a father/son relationship with Travers and Edie develops romantic feelings for Carlos. They eventually sleep together and later start dating. Carlos wants to keep the affair a secret, making Edie insecure. Edie considers going for full custody of Travers, but Carlos convinces her not to. Instead, she asks Carlos to move in with her. When he declines, Edie visits his landlady and tells lies about him to get him evicted. Afterward, Edie offers Carlos a place to stay, but he is quick to figure out her involvement in the process. Carlos tells Edie he doesn't love her, and she tricks him into staying, at first claiming she may be pregnant, and afterwards pretending to continue trying to get pregnant. Carlos discovers she is lying, and taking birth control and breaks up with her. At the closing scene of the season, Edie is shown with a sealed letter to Carlos as she hangs herself with a scarf.

=== Season 4 ===
It transpires that Edie's suicide attempt was merely a bid for Carlos' attention. Carlos feels responsible and agrees to resume their relationship, until Edie discovers his secret offshore bank account. With this, she blackmails him into a accepting a marriage proposal. However, Edie discovers Carlos' betrayal when she, Carlos, and Gabrielle's new husband, Victor Lang (John Slattery), all suffer from crabs. Edie hires a private detective, and after getting proof of the affair, she tells the IRS about his offshore account. Upon discovering that Carlos has emptied and closed his offshore account, she turns the pictures over to Victor. When Victor subsequently goes missing, Edie tells the police that Gaby may be responsible. A tornado is about to hit Wisteria Lane after Edie is given a folder allowing access to Carlos' offshore bank account. Edie and Gabrielle fight over it but lose the papers in the tornado.

Later, when Bree and Orson Hodge (Kyle MacLachlan) are having troubles, Edie lets Orson stay with her. Edie later shares a brief drunken kiss with Orson which is seen by Bree. The two begin to fight. Later, when Edie discovers that Bree's baby is really Austin and Danielle's, she threatens to tell everyone about it unless Bree does exactly what she wants. In turn, Bree admits everything to her friends and explains Edie's threats. The housewives confront Edie and cast her out, refusing to engage with, or speak to her anymore.

==== Five-year jump ====
During the five-year jump, Edie begins dating motivational speaker Dave Williams. Edie proposes and they elope. After, Dave convinces Edie into moving back to Wisteria Lane, back into her house that she had been renting.

=== Season 5 ===
The fifth season is set five years on from the fourth-season finale, when Edie returns to Wisteria Lane. Dave is persistent in convincing Edie to get along better with her neighbors. When Karen grows suspicious of Dave and attempts to investigate his background, Edie realizes she knows very little about his past. One night she wakes up and sees Dave talking to himself, and he admits he used to be married before he met Edie and that his wife died. Edie is furious he never told her and throws him out of the house.

Later, when Edie is locked in a basement with Susan, they have a heart-to-heart, convincing Edie to accept Dave back into her life. However, she grows suspicious again and goes to the local newspaper archives for information on Dave's family, where she learns that Dave had both a wife and daughter who were killed in a car crash. Upon receiving a news article on the accident, she learns it was Mike who had been driving the other car. She confronts Dave when he returns home from his camping trip and attempts to call Mike to warn him. Dave attacks her and strangles her, but Edie manages to escape and frantically drives away. Orson stumbles onto the road, causing her to swerve and hit an electric post. Dazed, Edie steps out onto the power line that had snapped and is killed by the electric shock.

After, the housewives pay a visit to Travers (Stephen Lunsford) to announce her death and to give him her ashes. On the journey up each of the housewives and Karen McCluskey share memories of Edie. Once they arrive, however, Travers tells them that they were her closest friends and that they should spread the ashes wherever they see fit. Ultimately, her ashes are spread around Wisteria Lane.

Edie later appears briefly in "Everybody Says Don't" as a hallucination of Dave's, while he continues to plot his revenge.
