= Joy Jorgensen =

American actress

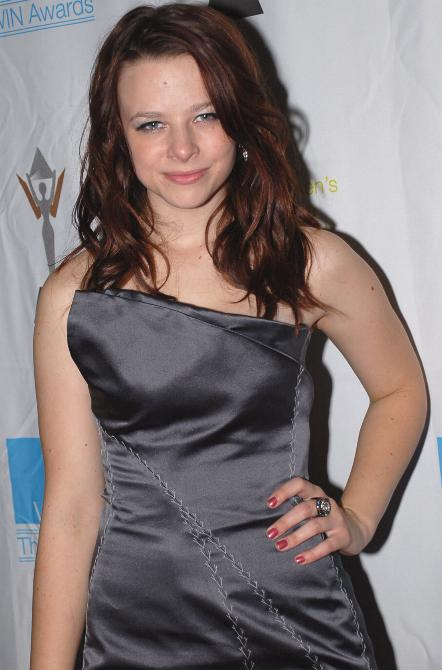
- Lauren at the Women's Image Network Awards, November 2007
- Born: Lauren Joy Jorgensen c. 1989
- Occupation: Actress
- Years active: 2002–present

Lauren Joy Jorgensen, (born c. 1989) is an American producer, director, writer and former actress. She is known for playing Danielle Van de Kamp on the ABC comedy-drama series Desperate Housewives (as Joy Lauren) and, as an adult, for creating award-winning films. Jorgensen is a Sundance and Rotterdam Producing Fellow, Torino Film Lab Script Editing Fellow, a recipient of the 2022 NYC Women's Fund for Media, Music and Theatre in partnership with the City of New York, and a 2024 Ingmar Bergman Estate Foundation Resident. Jorgensen is the founder of Killjoy Films.

== Early life and education ==
Jorgensen was born in Atlanta, Georgia. She is of Danish descent. She lived in the Vail, Colorado area from age 1 to 4. Jorgensen attended the Galloway School and appeared in several productions by the Alliance Theatre. At age 11, she moved from Atlanta to Los Angeles with her mother to pursue an acting career. She graduated from high school at age 14. Jorgensen graduated from Columbia University in 2012, where she majored in American history. She later received a Master's Degree in Screenwriting and Directing at the New York University Tisch School of the Arts.

Jorgensen is the founder of Killjoy Films. She has produced and directed a number of independent and short films.

== Career ==
=== 2001–2014: acting career ===
Jorgensen's acting career in Los Angeles began in 2001 when she was around 12 years old. As an actress, she was initially known as Joy Lauren. Of her acting appearances, she is best known for her role as Danielle Van De Kamp in Desperate Housewives, for which she appeared from the pilot through the final season. As part of the cast of Desperate Housewives, Jorgensen (under the name Joy Lauren) was nominated for a Screen Actors Guild Award for Outstanding Performance by an Ensemble in a Comedy Series in 2006, 2007 and 2008.

=== 2014–present: filmmaking and Killjoy Films ===
Jorgensen is the Founder of Killjoy Films, a film production company. Jorgensen launched Killjoy Films in New York in 2014 and moved the company to Berlin in 2016.

In addition to feature films, Jorgensen has produced notable shorts, including Laps, winner of the 2017 Sundance Film Festival Special Jury Award; and Blue Christmas, which premiered at Toronto International Film Festival and 2018 Sundance Film Festival, and is included on Sundance’s Holiday movies to watch. Both were directed by Charlotte Wells.

In 2020, Jorgensen produced the feature film Homebody, which won a U.S. In Progress award and the Outfest 2021 Special Programming Award for Emerging Talent for director Joseph Sackett. Also in 2020, Jorgensen began producing the feature film Runner, the feature debut of director Marian Mathias, as a Killjoy Films production, made in association with Pigasus Pictures, with Easy Riders Films and Man Alive as co-producers. Runner premiered at the 2022 Toronto Film Festival and won the Torino Co-Production Award, including production support from Creative Media Europe, as well as development support from the Cannes Cinéfondation Residence program.

Jorgensen and her production company Killjoy produced Bambirak, winner of the 2021 Sundance Film Festival’s Short Film Jury Award in International Fiction. The film was directed by Oscar-winner Zamarin Wahdat.

In 2024, it was announced that Jorgensen produced the narrative feature film We Strangers, directed by Anu Valia, which premiered at SXSW 2024, and went on to win the Grand Jury Prize for New American Cinema at the Seattle International Film Festival (SIFF). Jorgensen’s production, We Strangers, also won IndieWire Critics’ Pick, the Grand Jury Prize for Best Narrative Feature at the New Orleans Film Festival and the New Hampshire Film Festival, and was a Spotlighted Film at the Provincetown International Film Festival. The film was distributed through Quiver Distribution.

Jorgensen has produced award-winning films, garnering honors and support, including funding from the Cannes Cinéfondation Residence program. Jorgensen is both a Sundance and Rotterdam Producing Fellow, Torino Film Lab Script Editing Fellow, a recipient of the 2022 NYC Women's Fund for Media, Music and Theatre in partnership with the City of New York, and a 2024 Ingmar Bergman Estate Foundation Resident.

== Filmography ==
Producing
Title	Year	Notes
Laps	2017	Winner of the 2017 Sundance Film Festival Special Jury Award
Blue Christmas	2018	Premiered at Toronto International Film Festival and 2018 Sundance Film Festival, and is included on Sundance’s Holiday movies to watch.
Homebody	2020	Won a U.S. In Progress award and the Outfest 2021 Special Programming Award
Bambirak	2021	Winner of the 2021 Sundance Film Festival’s Short Film Jury Award in International Fiction; Film was directed by Oscar-winner Zamarin Wahdat.
Runner	2022	Premiered at the 2022 Toronto Film Festival; won the Torino Co-Production Award, including production support from Creative Media Europe, development support from the Cannes Cinéfondation Residence program.
We Strangers	2024	Premiered at SXSW 2024; Won the Grand Jury Prize for New American Cinema at the Seattle International Film Festival (SIFF).; Won IndieWire Critics’ Pick, the Grand Jury Prize for Best Narrative Feature at the New Orleans Film Festival and the New Hampshire Film Festival; Spotlighted Film at the Provincetown International Film Festival. Directed by Anu Valia Distributed through Quiver Distribution.

Television roles
Year	Title	Role	Notes
2002	The Division	Mary Ellen Smith	2 episodes Nominated — Young Artist Award for Best Performance in a TV Drama Series - Guest Starring Young Actress
2002	Lizzie McGuire	Head Cheerleader	Episode: "Movin' on Up"
2003	Still Standing	Jenna	Episode: "Still Shoplifting"
2004–08, 2010–11	Desperate Housewives	Danielle Van de Kamp	Recurring role; 78 episodes Nominated — Young Artist Award for Best Performance in a TV Series (Comedy) - Supporting Young Actress (2006); Nominated — Screen Actors Guild Award for Outstanding Performance by an Ensemble in a Comedy Series (2007–09)
2006	The Closer	Angela Carter	2 episodes
2007	Shark	Krystie Mays	Episode: "Starlet Fever"
2007	Private Practice	Darcy	Episode: "In Which Cooper Finds a Port in His Storm"

Film roles
Year	Title	Role	Notes
2003	Rouges	Choir	
2007	Teeth	Amy Johnson	
2010	The Assignment	Shelley	
2013	House of Dust	Blythe	
