= Zane Huett =

American actor

- Occupation: Actor
- Years active: 2003-present

Zane Huett is an American actor.

Zane is most famous for his featured role on the ABC television series Desperate Housewives playing the role of Parker Scavo, the younger son of Lynette and Tom Scavo. He plays the youngest Scavo boy, yet is older by six months than the actors Brent Kinsman and Shane Kinsman who play the older Scavo boys. Desperate Housewives is Huett's first role for television.

Other film credits include Mysterious Skin and P.O.V.: The Camera's Eye.

He has a younger sister (Zoe Alexa Julianne Huett) who also acts on occasion.

Zane currently serves as a StarPower Ambassador for Starlight Children's Foundation, encouraging other young people to commit their time, energy and resources to help other kids and working with Starlight to brighten the lives of seriously ill children.

== Filmography ==
Year	Title	Role	Notes
2003	P.O.V.: The Camera's Eye	Zane	TV-movie
2004	Just Another Day in the Neighborhood	Billy	
2004	Mysterious Skin	Jackson's Son	
2004-2008	Desperate Housewives	Parker Scavo	recurring role
2009	Big Love	kid	Episode: "Block Party"
2009	Dear Lemon Lima	Hercules Howard	
2010	Rock The House	Tommy	TV movie

== Awards ==
Awards
Year	Result	Award	Category	Nominated Work
2005	Won	Young Artist Awards	Best Performance in a TV Series (Comedy or Drama): Young Actor age 10 or Younger	Desperate Housewives
2007	Nominated	Screen Actors Guild Awards	Outstanding Performance by an Ensemble in a TV Series	Desperate Housewives
2008	Nominated	Screen Actors Guild Awards	Outstanding Performance by an Ensemble in a TV Series	Desperate Housewives
2009	Nominated	Screen Actors Guild Awards	Outstanding Performance by an Ensemble in a TV Series	Desperate Housewives
