= List of roles and awards of Marcia Cross =

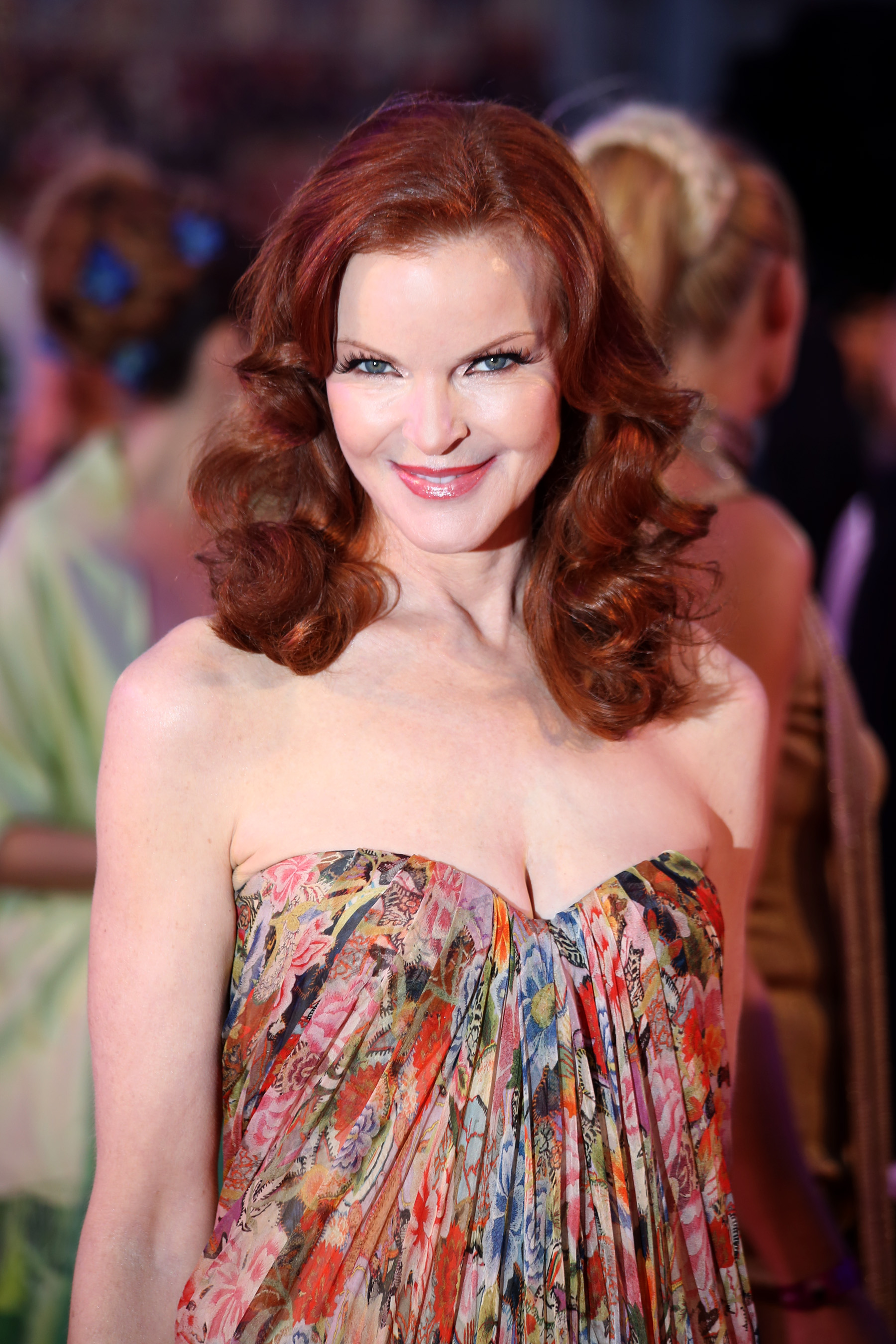
Cross in 2014

American actress Marcia Cross has appeared in a variety of television and film productions, most notably as Bree Van de Kamp in the ABC soap opera Desperate Housewives (2004–2012), for which she twice consecutive won the Screen Actors Guild Award for Outstanding Performance by an Ensemble in a Comedy Series and was also nominated for an Emmy, three Golden Globes and two Satellite Awards.

== Filmography ==
=== Television ===
Year	Title	Role	Notes
1984	The Edge of Night	Liz Correll	Daytime soap opera
1986	Tales from the Darkside	Marie Alcott	Episode: "Strange Love"
1986	Another World	Tanya	Daytime soap opera
1986–1988	One Life to Live	Kate Sanders	Daytime soap opera, series regular
1988	Almost Grown	Lesley Foley	Episode: "Pilot"
1989	Cheers	Susan Howe	Episode: "Sisterly Love"
1989	It's Garry Shandling's Show	Christine	Episode: "Ruth's Place"
1989	Booker	Sherrie Binford	Episode: "Razing Arrizola"
1989	Who's the Boss?	Kelly	Episode: "Mother and Child Disunion"
1989	Doctor Doctor	Lesley North	Episode: "Bachelor Doctor"
1990	Quantum Leap	Stephanie Heywood	Episode: "Good Night, Dear Heart"
1991	Jake and the Fatman	Marci Terrel	Episode: "You Don't Know Me"
1991	Pros and Cons	Lynn	Episode: "Murder Most Perfect"
1991–1992	Knots Landing	Victoria Broyelard	7 episodes
1992	Herman's Head	Princess Gillian	Episode: "Dirty Rotten Scoundrels"
1992	Murder, She Wrote	Marci Bowman	Episode: "Ever After"
1992–1997	Melrose Place	Kimberly Shaw	Recurring in seasons 1-3, series regular in 4 and 5, 114 episodes
1993	Raven	Carla Dellatory	Episode: "Death Games"
1995	Burke's Law	Leslie Dolan	Episode: "Who Killed the Highest Bidder?"
1997	Seinfeld	Dr. Sara Sitarides	Episode: "The Slicer"
1997	Ned & Stacey	Diana Huntley	3 episodes
1999	Touched by an Angel	Lauren Bradley	Episode: "The Whole Truth and Nothing But"
1999	Boy Meets World	Rhiannon Lawrence	3 episodes
1999	The Outer Limits	Kate Woods	Episode: "Summit"
2000	Profiler	Pamela Martin	Episode: "Proteus"
2000	Spin City	Joan	Episode: "Hello Charlie"
2000	Ally McBeal	Myra Robbins	Episode: "Girls' Night Out"
2001	Strong Medicine	Linda Loren	Episode: "Impaired"
2001	CSI: Crime Scene Investigation	Julia Fairmont	Episode: "Organ Grinder"
2002–2003	The King of Queens	Debi	Episodes: "Window Pain" and "Golden Moldy"
2003–2004	Everwood	Dr. Linda Abbott	Regular role, 18 episodes
2004–2012	Desperate Housewives	Bree Van de Kamp	Lead role
2005	Kathy Griffin: My Life on the D-List	Herself	Episode: "Out & About"
2015	Law & Order: Special Victims Unit	Charmaine Briggs	Episode: "December Solstice"
2015–2017	Quantico	Claire Haas	Recurring role
2018	Youth & Consequences	Principal Cowher	Web series, recurring role
2019	This Close	Blythe	Episode: "No Place Like Home"
2019	Soundtrack	Gigi's Mom	Episode: "Track 8: Gigi and Jean"
2019	The Edge of Sleep	Tracy	Web series, 5 episodes
2019	Jane the Novela	Renata	Unaired television series
2021	You	Jean Peck	Episodes: "W.O.M.B" and "Red Flag"
2022	Monarch	Skyler Samms	3 episodes

=== TV films ===
Year	Title	Role	Notes
1985	Brass	Victoria Willis	CBS television movie
1986	George Washington II: The Forging of a Nation	Anne Bingham	CBS television movie
1986	The Last Days of Frank and Jesse James	Sarah Hite	NBC television movie
1989	Just Temporary	Amy	Television movie
1990	Storm and Sorrow	Marty Hoey	Lifetime television movie
1994	M.A.N.T.I.S.	Lila McEwan	Fox television movie
1995	Mother's Day	Denise	Television movie
1996	All She Ever Wanted	Rachel Stockman	ABC television movie
1998	Target Earth	Karen Mackaphe	ABC television movie
2000	Dancing in September	Lydia Gleason	HBO television movie
2001	Living in Fear	Rebecca Hausman	Lifetime television movie
2001	Bad News Mr. Swanson	Doctor Knoll	Unsold television pilot
2002	Eastwick	Jane Spofford	Unsold television pilot

=== Feature films ===
Year	Title	Role	Notes
1985	Stephen King's Golden Tales	Marie Alcott	
1990	Bad Influence	Ruth Fielding	
1996	Ripple	Ali	Short film
1996	Always Say Goodbye	Anne Kidwell	Direct-to-video
1996	Female Perversions	Beth Stephens	
2002	Bank	American Actress	Unfinished film
2003	The Wind Effect	Molly	Short film
2009	Just Peck	Cheryl Peck	Direct-to-video
2011	Bringing Up Bobby	Mary	
2014	Fatrick	Arlene	Short film
2016	All the Way to the Ocean	Narrator	Short film
2020	The Secret of Karma	Goddess	

== Awards and nominations ==
Award	Year	Category	Nominated work	Result	Ref.
Golden Globe Awards	2005	Best Actress in a Television Series – Musical or Comedy	Desperate Housewives	Nominated	
Golden Globe Awards	2006	Best Actress in a Television Series – Musical or Comedy	Desperate Housewives	Nominated	
Golden Globe Awards	2007	Best Actress in a Television Series – Musical or Comedy	Desperate Housewives	Nominated	
Primetime Emmy Awards	2005	Outstanding Lead Actress in a Comedy Series	Desperate Housewives	Nominated	
Satellite Awards	2005	Best Actress in a Television Series (Musical or Comedy)	Desperate Housewives	Nominated	
Satellite Awards	2006	Best Actress in a Television Series (Musical or Comedy)	Desperate Housewives	Won	
Screen Actors Guild Awards	2005	Outstanding Performance by an Ensemble in a Comedy Series	Desperate Housewives	Won	
Screen Actors Guild Awards	2006	Outstanding Performance by an Ensemble in a Comedy Series	Desperate Housewives	Won	
Screen Actors Guild Awards	2007	Outstanding Performance by an Ensemble in a Comedy Series	Desperate Housewives	Nominated	
Screen Actors Guild Awards	2008	Outstanding Performance by an Ensemble in a Comedy Series	Desperate Housewives	Nominated	
Screen Actors Guild Awards	2009	Outstanding Performance by an Ensemble in a Comedy Series	Desperate Housewives	Nominated	
TCA Awards	2005	Individual Achievement in Comedy	Desperate Housewives	Nominated	
