= Guardians of the Galaxy: Cosmic Rewind =

Enclosed roller coaster at Epcot

- The Wonders of Xandar pavilion logo, inspired by the Universe of Energy pavilion logo The attraction logo used since 2022

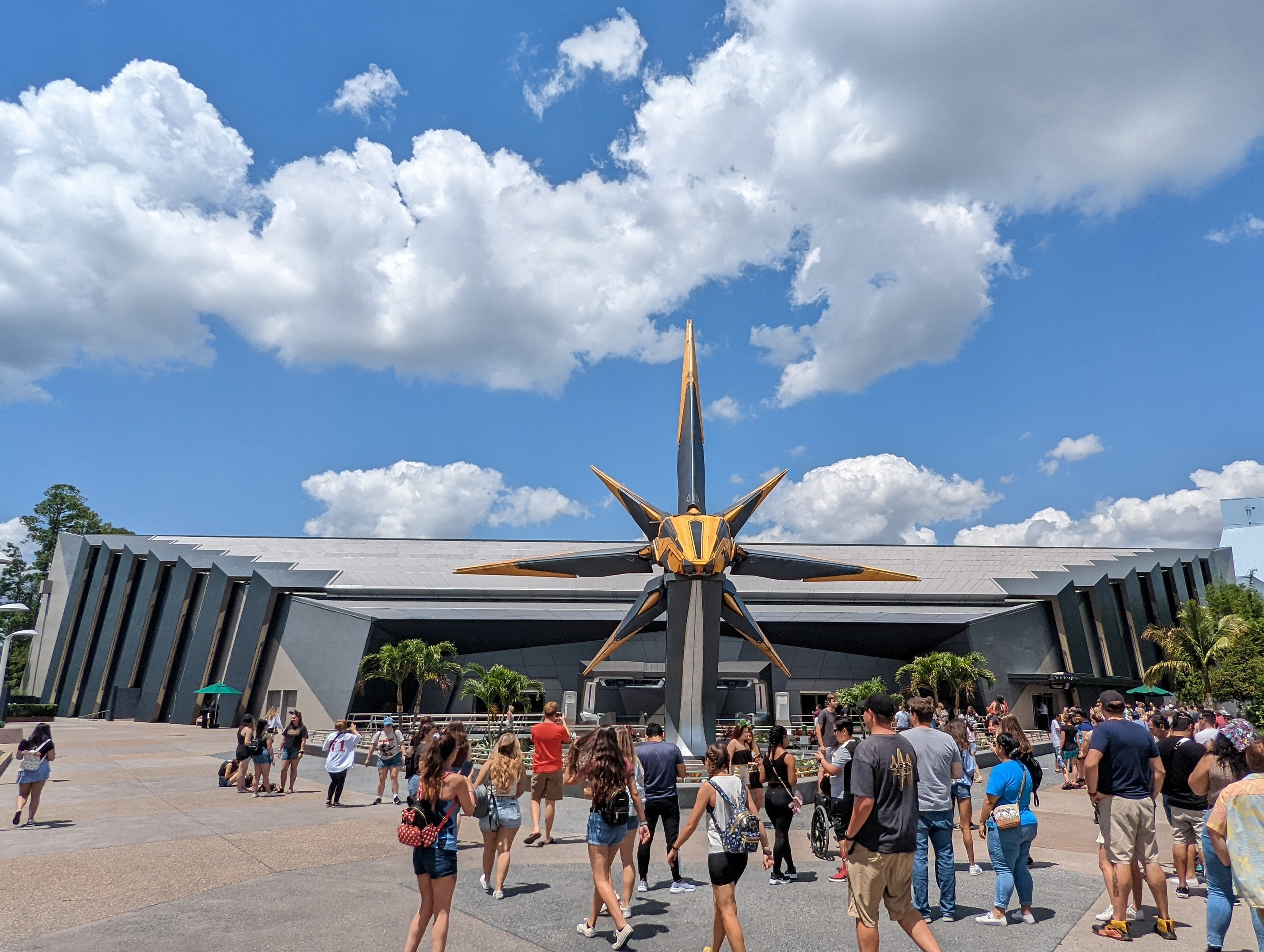
- Entrance to the attraction, with a Xandarian Starblaster ship in the foreground

Epcot
- Location: Epcot
- Park section: World Discovery
- Coordinates: 28.374599°N 81.547877°W
- Status: Operating
- Soft opening date: May 5, 2022
- Opening date: May 27, 2022
- Cost: US $500 million (estimated)
- Replaced: Ellen's Energy Adventure (Future World)

General statistics
- Type: Steel – Enclosed – Spinning
- Manufacturer: Vekoma
- Designer: Walt Disney Imagineering
- Model: LSM roller coaster
- Lift/launch system: LSM launch
- Length: 5,577.4 ft (1,700.0 m)
- Speed: 60 mph (97 km/h)
- Site area: 200,000 sq ft (19,000 m^{2})
- Inversions: 0
- Duration: 3:20
- Capacity: 2,000 riders per hour
- G-force: 2.75g
- Height restriction: 42 in (107 cm)
- Trains: 8 trains with 5 cars; riders arranged 2 across in 2 rows for a total of 20 riders per train
- Theme: Guardians of the Galaxy
- Music: Score by Tyler Bates; "September" by Earth, Wind and Fire; "One Way or Another" by Blondie; "Everybody Wants to Rule the World" by Tears for Fears; "Conga" by Miami Sound Machine; "I Ran (So Far Away)" by A Flock of Seagulls; "Disco Inferno" by the Trammps
- Pre-show hosts: Nova Prime Irani Rael; Centurion Tal Marik; Peter Quill / Star-Lord; Gamora; Drax; Rocket; Groot
- Ride hosts: Peter Quill / Star-Lord; Gamora; Drax; Rocket; Groot
- Lightning Lane Single Pass available
- Must transfer from wheelchair
- Guardians of the Galaxy: Cosmic Rewind at RCDB

Guardians of the Galaxy: Cosmic Rewind is an enclosed roller coaster at Epcot at Walt Disney World, manufactured by Dutch company Vekoma. Based on the Marvel Cinematic Universe Guardians of the Galaxy films, it is the first attraction at Walt Disney World to feature characters from the Marvel Universe. Opened on May 27, 2022, it is Disney's first backwards-launched roller coaster. It replaced the Universe of Energy pavilion, which closed on August 13, 2017.

Originally set to open in 2021, the roller coaster was delayed in part due to the impact of the COVID-19 pandemic on The Walt Disney Company and its theme parks. It was instead given a summer 2022 opening as part of Epcot's 40th anniversary celebration, which in turn was part of Walt Disney World's 50th anniversary celebration. With an estimated cost of $500 million, it is one of the most expensive amusement park rides ever built.

== History ==
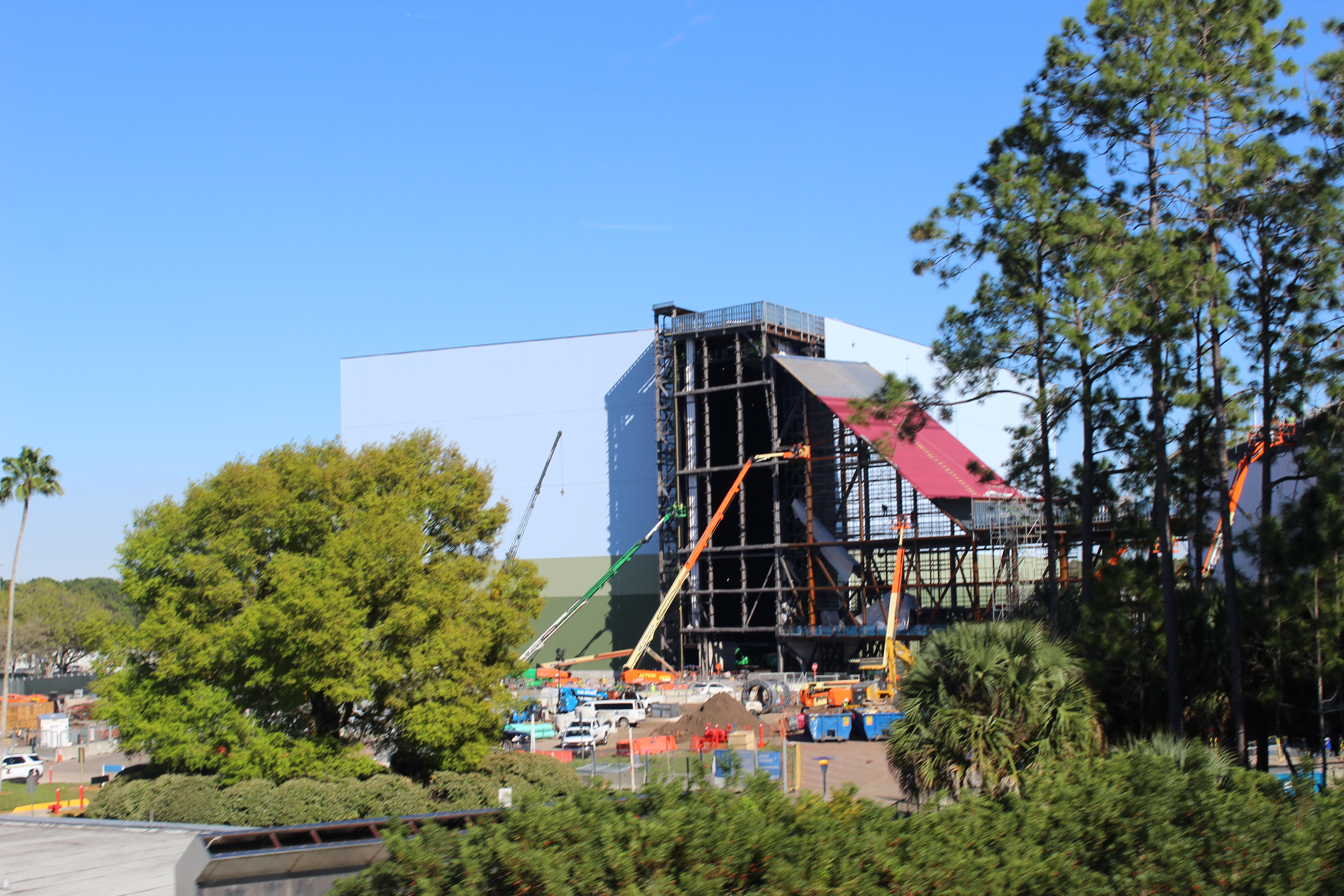
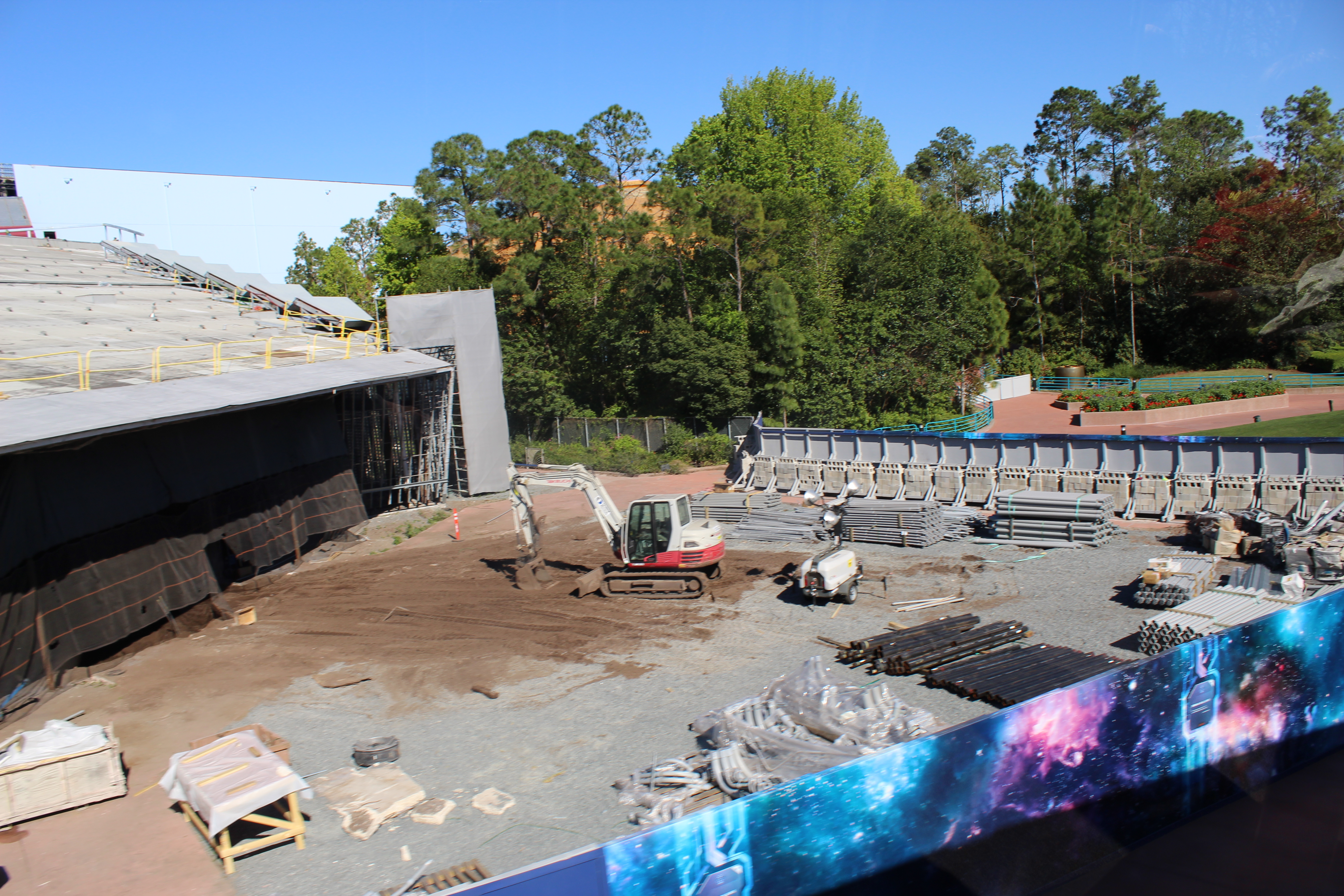
Construction of the attraction, pictured March 2019. The roller coaster is housed in a new show building (top) built behind the former Universe of Energy building, the latter of which was reused and retrofitted for the queue (bottom).

The attraction was announced as part of an overhaul of Epcot at the 2017 D23 Expo. Ellen's Energy Adventure closed on August 13, 2017, and construction of the roller coaster began later in the same month. The show building that housed Universe of Energy was reused and retrofitted for the new attraction. The roller coaster itself is housed in a new, massive show building situated backstage, behind the Universe of Energy building, utilizing 960 truckloads of concrete for its foundation. The first track piece of the ride was installed November 2018.

At D23 Japan in 2018, it was confirmed that the ride would be one of the world's longest enclosed roller coasters, set to open during the 50th anniversary celebration of Walt Disney World, late 2021.

The name of the ride, Guardians of the Galaxy: Cosmic Rewind, was announced on August 25, 2019, at the D23 Expo 2019. Unlike its sister attraction, Guardians of the Galaxy – Mission: Breakout! at Disney California Adventure, the attraction cannot use the Marvel brand in its title or in advertising due to a 1994 contract with Universal Destinations & Experiences, which pre-dates Disney's 2009 purchase of Marvel Entertainment.

Filming for the ride commenced in October 2021. Guardians of the Galaxy film series cast members Chris Pratt, Zoe Saldaña, Dave Bautista, and Glenn Close reprised their roles from the Marvel Cinematic Universe (MCU) as Peter Quill / Star-Lord, Gamora, Drax, and Nova Prime Irani Rael, respectively. The first footage from the ride was released in March 2022. Disney Parks, through social media, also revealed on April 25, 2022, that actor Terry Crews would be part of the pre-show experience, playing Centurion Tal Marik, a new character created specifically for the attraction.

Cast Member previews for the attraction began on April 17, 2022, while Walt Disney World Annual Passholders received an early look at the ride beginning on May 8, 2022. The attraction held its grand opening ceremony on May 27, 2022, opening to the public on the same day. Similar to the attractions within Avengers Campus, the attraction is inspired by, but not canonical to, the MCU.

On June 23, 2022, Disney announced that Cosmic Rewind would receive a Christmas overlay with a holiday mixtape soundtrack, featuring "a mash-up of seasonal jams". The limited offering began on November 25, 2022, coinciding with the release of The Guardians of the Galaxy Holiday Special on Disney+ the same day, running until December 30, 2022.

== Attraction ==
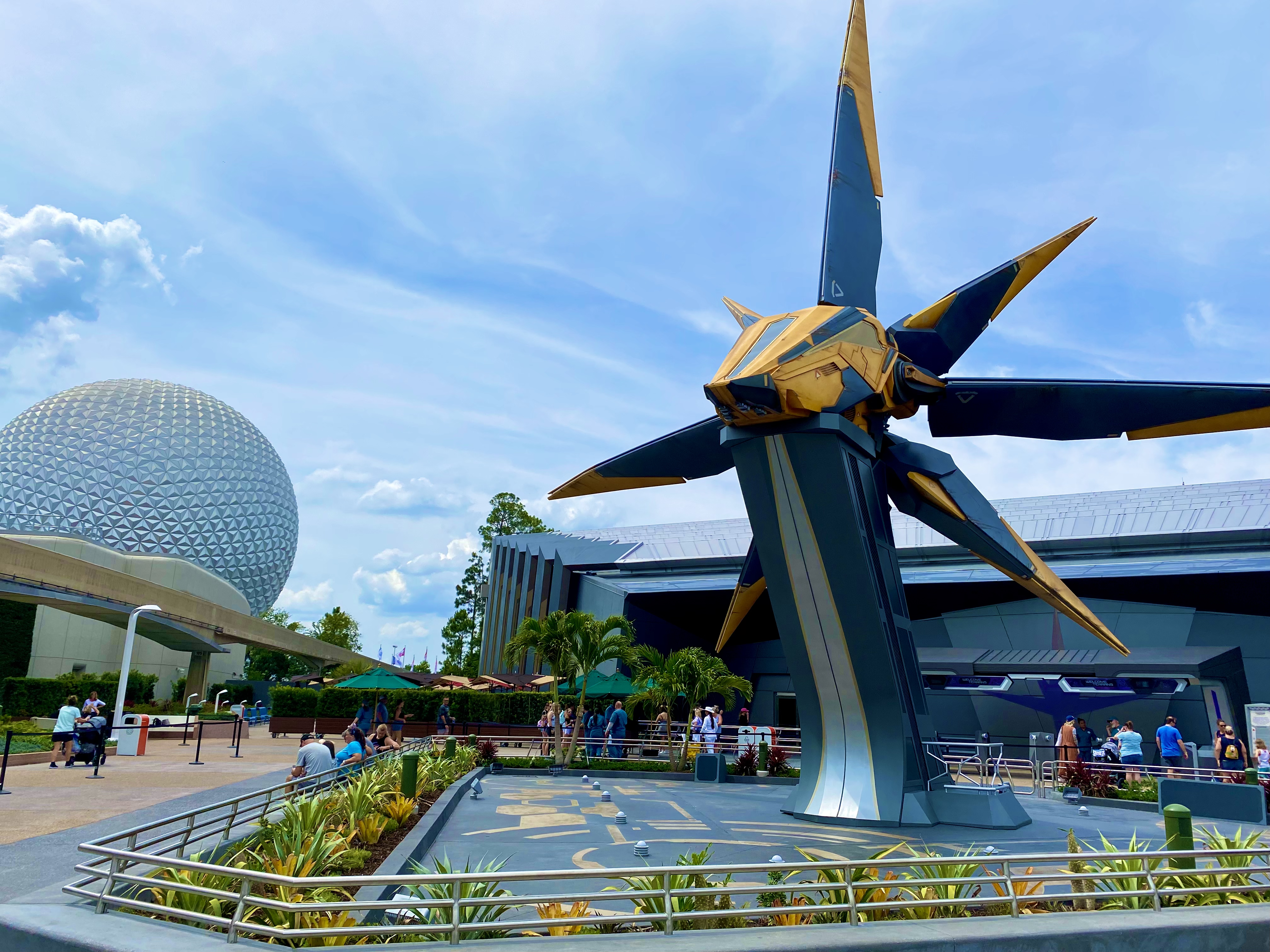
A Starblaster ship of the Xandarian Nova Corps sits on a perch in front of the attraction.

The attraction is presented as the Wonders of Xandar Pavilion, the first Other-world Pavilion at Epcot. Much like the pavilions at the World Showcase, it features exhibits and models of the history and culture of the capital of the Nova Empire, Xandar, presented by the Nova Corps as a cultural exchange from them to the people of Terra (the name by which they refer to Earth). At the entrance of the attraction sits a Starblaster ship of the Xandarian Nova Corps on a perch, with a dedication plaque that reads:

FROM OUR WORLD TO YOURS
This Starblaster is presented as a gift from the Nova Corps to the people of Terra.
May it, like EPCOT, serve to inspire peace through understanding.

— Dedicated in the Terran year 2022, Nova Prime Irani Rael

=== Queue ===
The queue begins in the "Galaxarium", a galaxy-equivalent to a planetarium, where a Xandarian super computer named World Mind explains how they are learning about the culture of Terrans (as the Xandarians refer to the inhabitants of Earth). The queue continues up a ramp into the gallery that features a projection mapping model of Xandar, along with screens showcasing their culture, noting the similarities of the capital of the Nova Empire with Walt Disney's EPCOT concept. Along the gallery, models of Xandarian ships are also displayed, as well as uniforms of the Nova Corps high-ranking officers and interviews with each member of the Guardians of the Galaxy, especially Peter Quill / Star-Lord, who exclaims his excitement to go back and experience Epcot attractions that he'd enjoyed as a child, unaware that they no longer exist.

=== Pre-show ===
At the end of the gallery, Terrans are ushered to the final stop of the Wonders of Xandar Pavilion, hosted by Nova Prime Irani Rael of the Nova Corps. She welcomes the guests and begins by explaining how both Xandar and Terra were born of the same moment — the Big Bang. She then details how the Xandarians traveled through the galaxy to reach Terra to showcase their culture: by utilizing a Cosmic Generator, a piece of Xandarian technology that creates "jumpholes" that allowed them to create shortcuts to reach their destination much quicker. As a culmination of the Wonders of Xandar Pavilion, Terrans will be teleported to a Nova ship in space to demonstrate the Cosmic Generator. After Nova Prime's presentation, Centurion Tal Marik of the Nova Corps welcomes Terrans and advises the prohibition of communication devices with recording capabilities (i.e. cellphones and smartphones), after which Terrans are ushered into the teleportation chamber.

After Terrans have been teleported to the Nova ship, the Cosmic Generator is stolen and the ship loses its power before a demonstration could be presented, prompting Nova Prime to urgently call the Guardians of the Galaxy for help. Peter Quill / Star-Lord, Gamora, Drax, Rocket, and Groot all appear on screen answering the distress call, only to discover that a Celestial named Eson, seen outside the Nova ship, has stolen the Cosmic Generator. Unhappy with the Terrans, the Celestial uses the Cosmic Generator to send Terra through a jumppoint to the dawn of time, with the intention of erasing its existence, before entering the jumppoint itself.

Quill urges Centurion Tal Marik to follow Eson while the Guardians rendezvous with the Nova ship to stop the Celestial but is unable to do so due to the lack of power in the ship and needing to send Terrans to evacuation shuttles. However, Rocket suggests he can control the shuttles to have the Terrans follow Eson via jumpholes and rendezvous with them instead, as they are their only way of tracking the Celestial in order to recover the Cosmic Generator. Terrans are then led to the corridors of the loading platforms to board their evacuation shuttles.

=== Ride experience ===
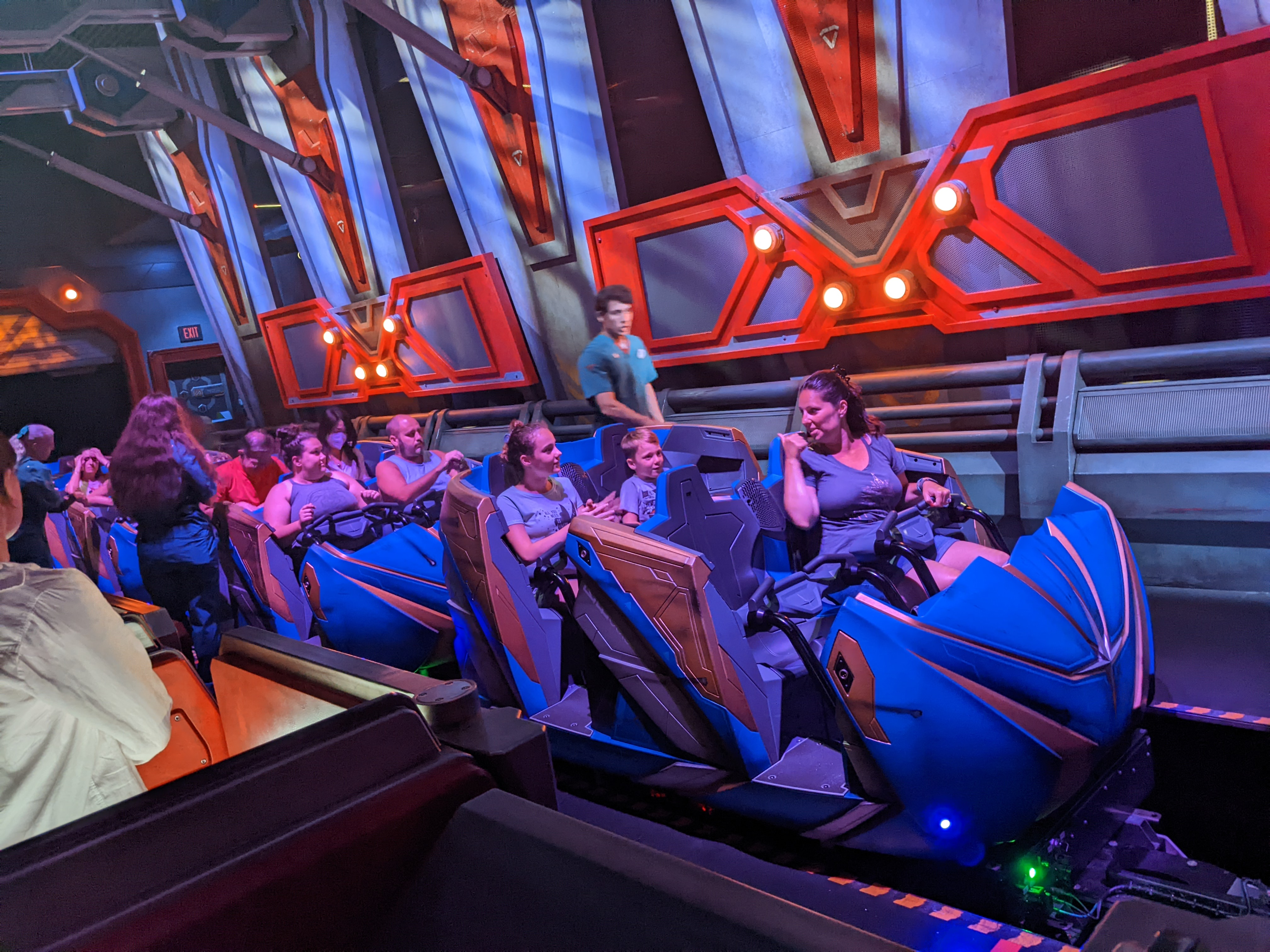
Ride vehicle at the loading platform.

As the shuttles depart, Terrans begin making their way out of the Nova ship to enter the jump point in their evacuation shuttles. Peter Quill / Star-Lord and Gamora assure them that they're tracking the shuttles to meet them, while Drax and Rocket instead make pessimistic remarks about the situation. The Guardians wish the Terrans luck as they set off, and after crossing the jump points the Terrans arrive at Eson's location, where it holds the Cosmic Generator. Shortly after, the Guardians of the Galaxy arrive in their ship as Eson prepares to throw the Cosmic Generator towards Terra, who disregards Quill's music from the Guardians' ship as "noise." The Guardians then blast the Cosmic Generator from the Celestial's hands, opening another jump point which proceeds to suck everything in, taking them back in time to the Big Bang until eventually fading into complete darkness. Suddenly, the evacuation shuttles are launched backwards in an explosion, and it is at this point that the vehicles begin spinning on their axes to achieve a sensation of "space travel." While the story develops around them, one of the six songs randomly selected plays.

As the evacuation shuttles travel through multiple jumpholes along the way, the Guardians of the Galaxy engage in combat with Eson around the Terrans as they also cross multiple jump points. The Guardians finally lead a fleet of Nova Corp Starblasters to Eson, who manage to contain the Celestial and recover the Cosmic Generator. As the Guardians of the Galaxy travel far from the scene, they lead the Terrans to a final series of jump points that take them to the Milky Way, then around the Moon before locking the coordinates for EPCOT and sending them back to Terra. As they arrive, Peter Quill welcomes the Terrans to the Guardians of the Galaxy. The rest of the team remarks amongst themselves as they disembark.

== Cast ==
Actors from the Guardians of the Galaxy films reprised their roles for the attraction. However, Bradley Cooper and Vin Diesel, who voice Rocket and Groot in the films, respectively, were not involved in the project. Terry Crews plays a new character created specifically for the attraction.

- Chris Pratt as Peter Quill / Star-Lord
- Zoe Saldaña as Gamora
- Dave Bautista as Drax the Destroyer
- Glenn Close as Nova Prime Irani Rael
- Terry Crews as Centurion Tal Marik
- Katie Leigh as World Mind (voice)

== Music ==
Like in the Guardians of the Galaxy films, music plays a key role in the attraction. Over a hundred songs were considered by Walt Disney Imagineering for the ride experience, narrowing it down to six featured songs that are randomly-selected by a computer, each fitting the same motion profile of the ride vehicles:

- "Disco Inferno" by the Trammps
- "I Ran (So Far Away)" by A Flock of Seagulls
- "Conga" by Miami Sound Machine
- "Everybody Wants to Rule the World" by Tears for Fears
- "One Way or Another" by Blondie
- "September" by Earth, Wind & Fire

Additionally, Tyler Bates, composer of Guardians of the Galaxy and Guardians of the Galaxy: Vol. 2, scored over two hours of original music for the queue. An electric guitar cover of the original Universe of Energy attraction's theme song (written by Joel Hirschhorn and Al Kasha) can also be heard before the attraction's backwards launch.

=== Christmas overlay ===
On June 23, 2022, Disney announced that Cosmic Rewind would receive a Christmas overlay with a holiday mixtape soundtrack. The overlay's title was announced at New York Comic Con on October 7, 2022 as: Guardians of the Galaxy: Cosmic Rewind Holiday Remix. The limited offering began on November 25, 2022, coinciding with the release of The Guardians of the Galaxy Holiday Special on Disney+ the same day, and ran until December 30, 2022. The attraction's soundtrack was replaced by a rendition of "Run Rudolph Run", with lyrics changed to reflect Rocket, titled "Run Run Rocket". This overlay was never returned, due to poor reception.

On October 6, 2026, after three years of absence, a new Christmas overlay was announced for the attraction to run from November 25, 2026 to January 6, 2027, featuring "It's the Most Wonderful Time of the Year" by Andy Williams, "Christmas Eve/Sarajevo 12/24" by the Trans-Siberian Orchestra and "Christmas Wrapping" by The Waitresses.

=== September ===
Every September 21st, since 2023, Cosmic Rewind's soundtrack is locked to Earth, Wind & Fire's "September" for the entire day, in reference to said date from the song's opening lyric.

== Rankings ==
Golden Ticket Awards: Top steel Roller Coasters
Year									1998	1999
Ranking									–	–
Year	2000	2001	2002	2003	2004	2005	2006	2007	2008	2009
Ranking	–	–	–	–	–	–	–	–	–	–
Year	2010	2011	2012	2013	2014	2015	2016	2017	2018	2019
Ranking	–	–	–	–	–	–	–	–	–	–
Year	2020	2021	2022	2023	2024	2025	2026			
Ranking	N/A	–	–	–	18	18	15			

== See also ==
- Guardians of the Galaxy – Mission: Breakout!
- Avengers Campus
