= Universe of Energy =

Former attraction at Epcot

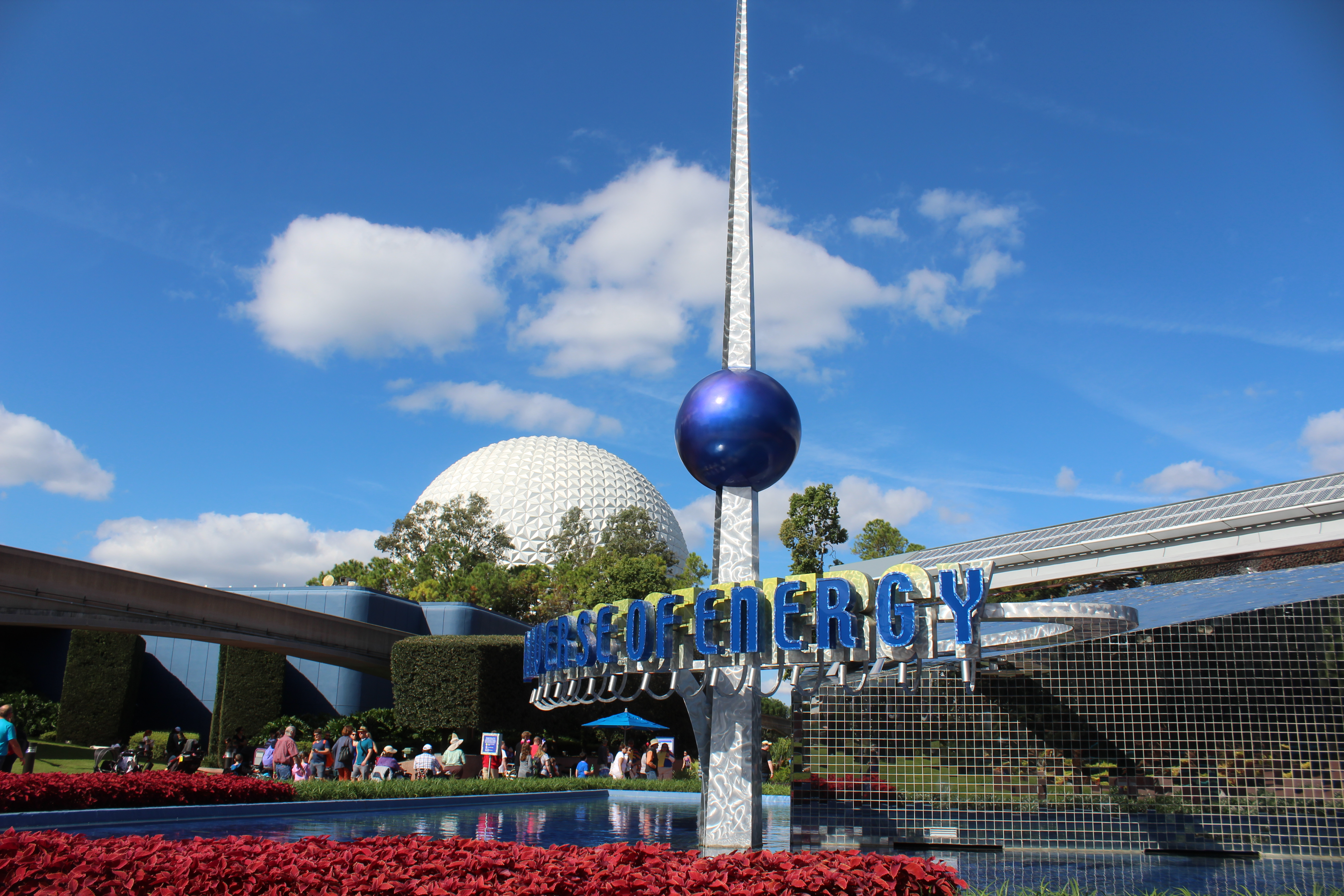
Universe of Energy marquee

The Universe of Energy was a pavilion on the eastern side of Future World (now World Discovery) at Epcot, a theme park at the Walt Disney World Resort in Bay Lake, Florida. One of Epcot's opening day attractions in 1982, it explored the world of energy through four large-format film presentations and a slow-moving dark ride through a jungle diorama filled with audio-animatronic dinosaurs. In 1996, it was re-themed to Ellen's Energy Adventure, starring Ellen DeGeneres, Bill Nye, and Jamie Lee Curtis.

The Universe of Energy pavilion was sponsored by ExxonMobil (formerly Exxon) for most of its lifetime from 1982 through 2004. After years of dwindling popularity, it closed permanently on August 13, 2017 and was replaced with Guardians of the Galaxy: Cosmic Rewind, which reused its show building.

== Universe of Energy (1982–1996) ==
Universe of Energy
- The logo for the original attraction

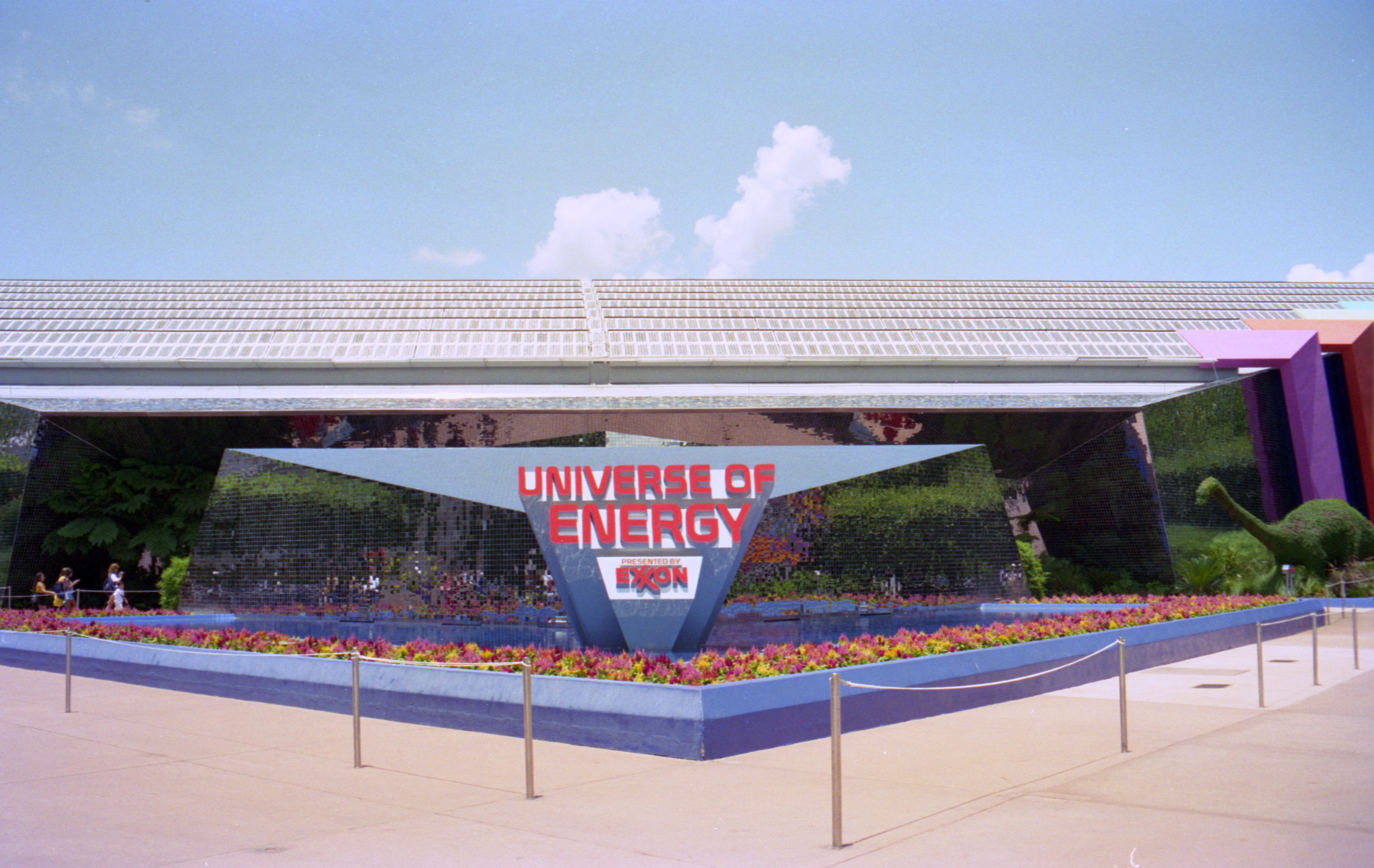

EPCOT Center
- Area: Future World
- Coordinates: 28.374599°N 81.547877°W
- Status: Removed
- Cost: $46,000,000
- Opening date: October 1, 1982
- Closing date: January 21, 1996
- Replaced by: Ellen's Energy Adventure

Ride statistics
- Attraction type: Pavilion
- Designer: WED Enterprises
- Theme: Energy
- Music: Robert Moline - Energy (You Make the World Go 'Round), Al Kasha & Joel Hirschhorn - Universe of Energy, Buddy Baker - Film background scores
- Vehicle type: Automated Guided Vehicles (AGV)
- Vehicles: 6
- Riders per vehicle: 80
- Duration: 45:00
- Audio-animatronics: 34
- Sponsor: Exxon
- Host: Vic Perrin
- Wheelchair accessible
- Assistive listening available

The original Universe of Energy pavilion was itself an innovation in energy technology, as its roof was covered with 80,000 photovoltaic solar cells that partially powered the ride vehicles. Visitors were transported through the pavilion in large battery-powered "traveling theatre cars" that followed guide-wires embedded in the floor, rather than riding along conventional ride tracks. The attraction featured numerous films on the subject of energy, and a ride through a primeval diorama with audio-animatronic dinosaurs.

=== Pre-show ===
The original pre-show had an eight-minute live-action film about the various forms of energy found in nature, and traced the history of how humankind had harnessed these energy forms. Known as the Kinetic Mosaic, the film was designed by Czech film director Emil Radok. The mosaic screen consisted of 100 rotating prism-shaped flip screens (reminiscent of those on the classic game show Concentration), arranged in a 25-by-four array. The flip screens rotated under computer control and were synchronized to the film projected onto their surfaces by five synchronized projectors. Each flip screen had three sides, with white projection surfaces on two sides and a matte black surface on the third. The combination of the film and the screens' rotation created undulating, sometimes 3D-appearing images. At the pre-show's conclusion, the song Energy (You Make The World Go ‘Round) was played.

=== Theatre one film ===
On entering the theatre, guests were seated in one of six sections. The seating area rotated 180 degrees to the right to face three large movie screens for the first film: a four-minute traditionally-animated film that depicted the beginnings of life on earth and the formation of fossil fuels.

=== Primeval diorama ===
At the conclusion of the film, the seating area rotated 90 degrees to the left to face a curtain, which lifted to reveal a primeval diorama. The entire seating area moved into the diorama, separating into six multi-passenger vehicles that took guests on a seven-minute journey populated by numerous animatronic dinosaurs and other animals, including a pair of Edaphosaurus resting in a grove; a fight between two Arthropleura; a family of Brontosaurus in a swamp (with realistic "swampy" smell); a Stegosaurus fighting an Allosaurus on an overhead cliff; several Trachodon bathing beneath a waterfall; a number of Ornithomimus watching helplessly as one of their own sank into a boiling tar pit; an Elasmosaurus that lunged out of a tidal pool at guests; and numerous Pteranodon perched on top of an erupting volcano with flowing lava and a realistic "volcano" smell. More animals could be seen in the jungle, including giant dragonflies and snails.

=== Theatre II film ===
Leaving the diorama, the vehicles entered the EPCOT Energy Information Center, where they reassembled into their original theatre seating formation. Here, guests viewed a 12-minute live-action film, on three giant wrap-around screens, that took them on an in-depth look at current and future energy resources around the world.

=== Theatre I finale film ===
At the film's conclusion, the screens raised and the entire seating area traveled into Theatre I and rotated back into its starting position, facing the audience towards a large cylindrical screen. There, guests viewed a final two-minute animated film that was reflected off of mirrored walls in the theatre. It depicted an ever-evolving landscape of colorful, laser-like imagery of the various ways humankind has benefited from harnessing energy, accompanied by an upbeat song titled Universe of Energy.

=== Summer 1996 version ===
The summer of 1996 saw many changes come to Future World East. World of Motion had closed in January in preparation for its conversion into Test Track, and Horizons was not operating consistently due to alleged structural issues with the pavilion. Universe of Energy was set to reopen in June after a five-month refurbishment, but this was delayed due to filming troubles. This meant that Future World East would only have the Wonders of Life pavilion open for the peak summer season. To address the issue, Epcot made the decision to temporarily reopen the Universe of Energy while the remodel was in progress.

This temporary version of the show featured the original 1982 films, but most of the effects were completely disabled. Most notably, the Kinetic Mosaic screen from the original pre-show had been removed resulting in the film being projected onto static screens, losing the shape-shifting effect of the film. Also removed were the maps and television monitors on the wall in the Epcot Energy Information Center in Theatre II, having already been replaced by the KNRG radio tower backdrop for the new show. For this scene, a new narration played that covered much of the same information as the original narration minus any mention of the maps and monitors. In Theatre I, the mirrors on the walls had already been removed by this point, resulting in a much less dramatic version of the finale film.

During this period, some elements for the new show had already been installed and had to be hidden. This included the Audio-Animatronic figure of Ellen DeGeneres in the diorama. Temporary rockwork was placed in front of the figure to hide it from view. However, the elasmosaurus figure had already been reprogrammed for the new show, leading to the awkward result of having it lunge at rocks instead of the ride vehicles as it had originally done. There were several other changes being made to the diorama. The dinosaurs were repainted and a new soundtrack was added. One of the brontosaurus animatronics could now have the ability to sneeze water. Several effects were turned off, including the storm and swamp smell. The lava flow was changed to running water and the fog effects inside the volcano were changed to mist and flashing lights.

This version of the show ran from June 14 to September 2, 1996. The pavilion was closed again for two weeks to add the new films for the new version of the attraction.

== Ellen's Energy Adventure (1996–2017) ==
Ellen's Energy Adventure
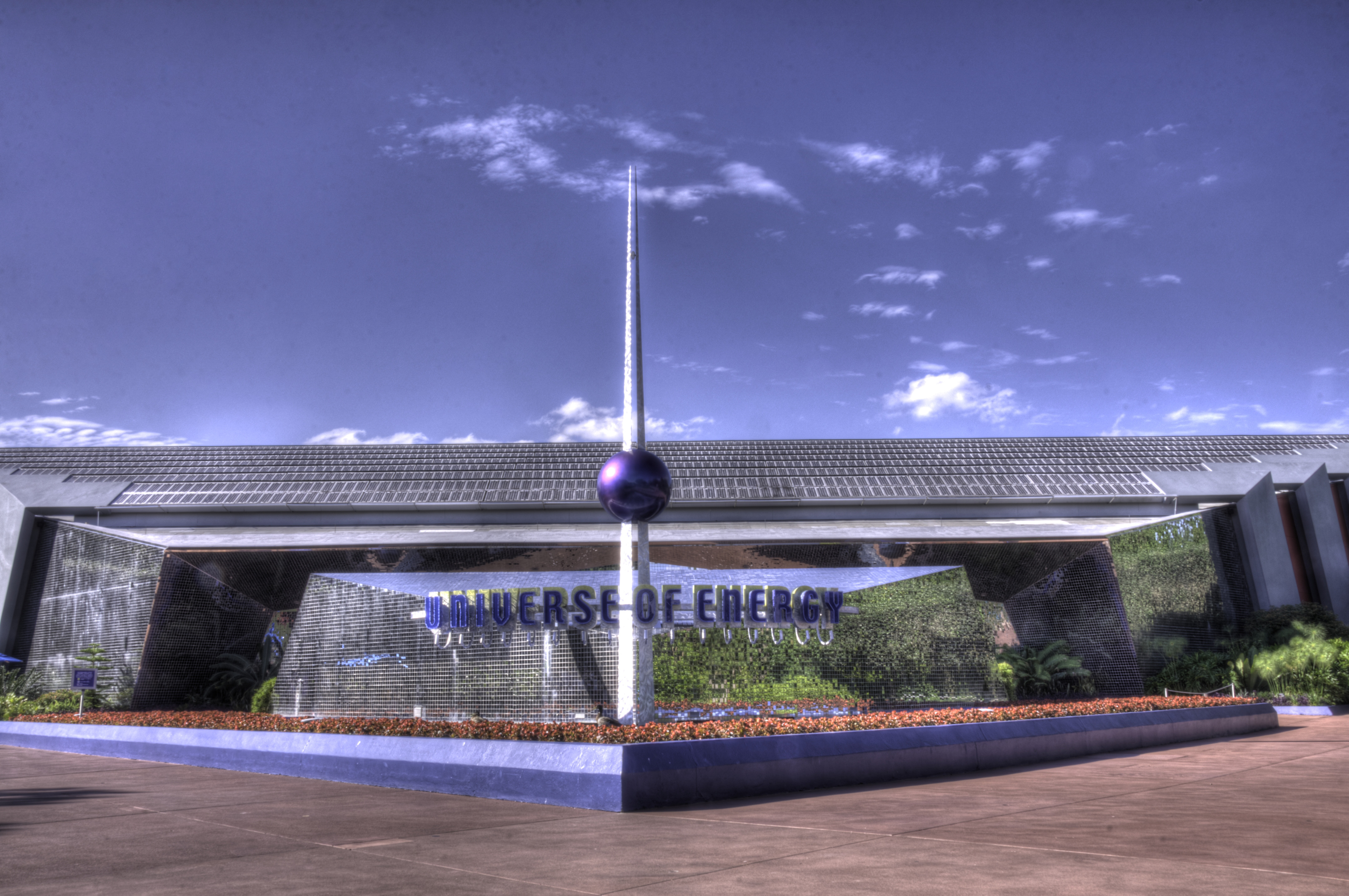

Epcot
- Area: Future World
- Coordinates: 28.374599°N 81.547877°W
- Status: Removed
- Opening date: September 15, 1996
- Closing date: August 13, 2017
- Replaced: Universe of Energy
- Replaced by: Guardians of the Galaxy: Cosmic Rewind (World Discovery)

Ride statistics
- Attraction type: Traveling theater dark ride
- Designer: Walt Disney Imagineering
- Theme: Energy
- Music: Bruce Broughton
- Capacity: 2432 riders per hour
- Vehicle type: Automated Guided Vehicles (AGV)
- Vehicles: 6
- Riders per vehicle: 80
- Rows: 10
- Riders per row: 8
- Audience capacity: 480 per show
- Duration: 45:00
- Audio-animatronics: 26
- Sponsors: Exxon (1996–2001); ExxonMobil (2001–2004)
- Ride hosts: Ellen DeGeneres; Bill Nye
- Wheelchair accessible
- Assistive listening available
- Closed captioning available

Ellen's Energy Adventure starred Ellen DeGeneres, Bill Nye "The Science Guy", Jamie Lee Curtis, Alex Trebek, and Johnny Gilbert. It took a lighthearted look at various energy resources, how energy was produced, the history of energy production, and the search for new energy resources. It focused on the origins of fossil fuels such as petroleum, coal and natural gas, and described renewable sources such as solar and hydroelectric power. In 2011, Ellen's Energy Adventure surpassed the original Universe of Energy show as the longest version of the attraction.

The second version of the show reused the traveling theater system of the original Universe of Energy show. The primeval diorama used essentially the same sets and Audio-Animatronic dinosaurs as the original show, although during the renovation to the Ellen's Energy Adventure show, the dinosaurs were repainted in much brighter colors. Several animatronic figures were added, along with an upbeat musical score to help connect it with the new film footage.

=== Pre-show theatre film ===
In the eight-minute pre-show film, Ellen DeGeneres greets the guests from her apartment living room and welcomes them to the Universe of Energy. She sits down to watch Jeopardy! and is unenthused to see college rival Judy Peterson (Curtis), who knows a lot about energy, on the show. Ellen's neighbor Bill Nye the Science Guy enters her room and tries to tell her energy is necessary for the universe to exist, but Ellen chooses to take a nap instead. She dreams that she is playing on Jeopardy!, where all the categories relate to energy, against Judy and Albert Einstein (Benny Wasserman). Not knowing anything about energy, she falls way behind Judy. At the end of the first round, Ellen becomes lucid, and Bill Nye steps in and offers to help teach Ellen about energy during the commercial break. She has trouble answering the questions, so Bill Nye requests her to go back. While she tells him to go backstage, he tells her that they are actually going way back, many billions of years.

=== Theatre I film ===
Upon entering the theatre, guests are seated in one of six sections. The seating area rotates 180 degrees to the right as guests face three large movie screens above the exit doors for the first part of the film: a five-minute CGI live-action film in which Bill takes Ellen back billions of years in time to witness the Big Bang and the formation of the Earth. They put on their headphones and close the door. Following a big explosion, the screens show a Milky Way galaxy, the Solar System, a volcanic biome and rocky terrain. Finally, the pair end up in a prehistoric jungle and Bill looks at his watch saying that they are set 220 million years in the past. There, he explains how fossil fuels are formed. Ellen tells the guests that they would be going with him but hears a Dinosaur roar and tries to catch up. During this time, the seating area rotates 90 degrees to the left as guests face a curtain. After Ellen talks about a dinosaur's brain size, one of them appears offscreen. As Ellen escapes, another dinosaur roar can be heard as the screen shakes.

=== Primeval diorama ===
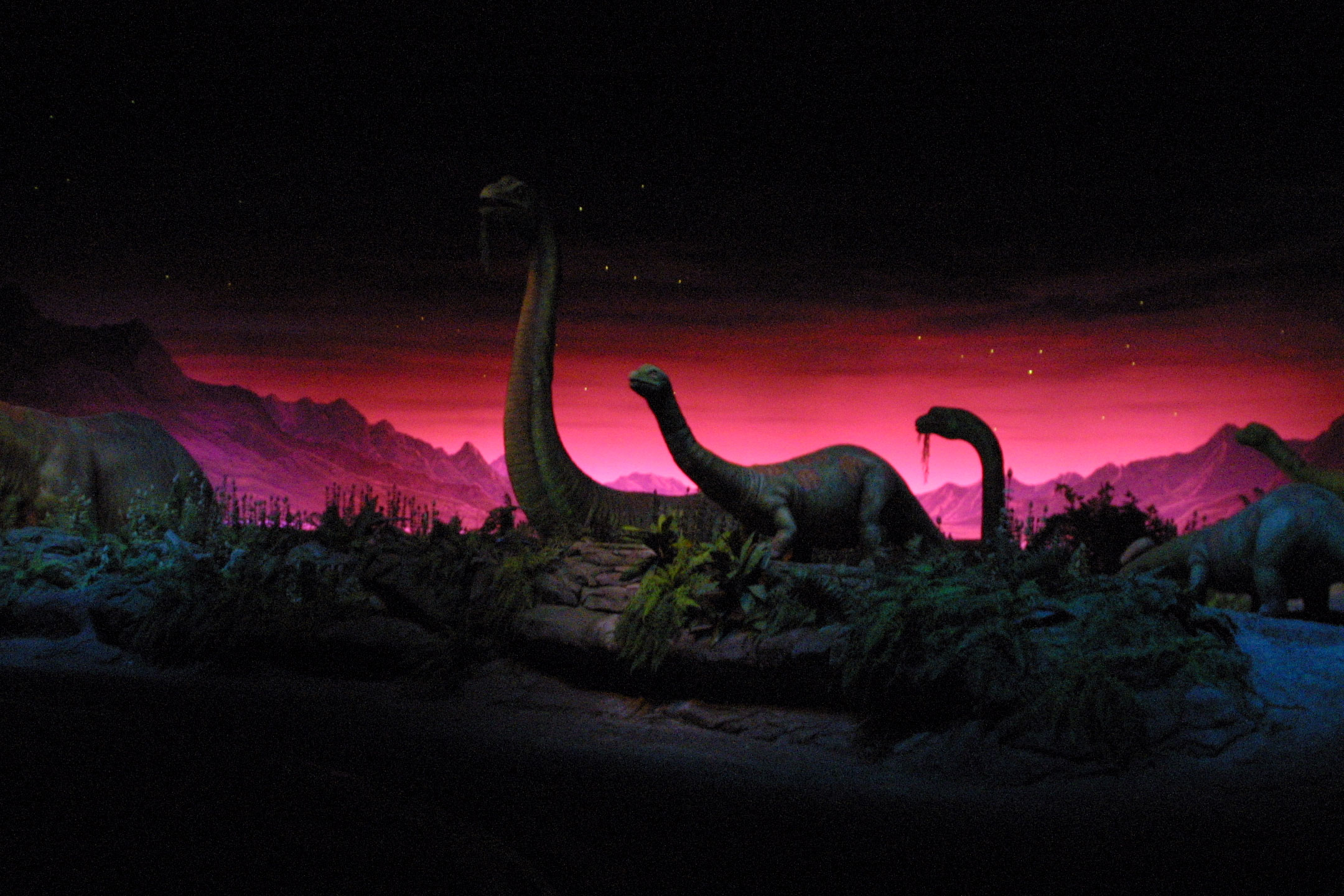
Brontosaurus in the Universe of Energy

At the conclusion of the film, the curtain rises to reveal the primeval diorama. The entire seating area moves into the diorama where it then separates into six multi-passenger vehicles that takes guests on a seven-minute journey through the diorama, which is populated by numerous audio-animatronic dinosaurs including two Edaphosaurus, two Arthropleura fighting and a family of Brontosaurus in a swamp (one of whom sneezes water from its nose onto guests), a Stegosaurus fighting an Allosaurus on an overhead cliff, three Trachodon bathing beneath a waterfall, a number of Ornithomimus drinking from a pond (one of whom splashes water at guests), an Audio-Animatronic Ellen standing near a tidal pool fighting off an Elasmosaurus with a tree branch, and several Pteranodon perched around an erupting volcano. After November 2014, the Audio-Animatronic figure of Ellen fighting off the Elasmosaurus with a tree branch stopped working and was removed. It was replaced with a group of smaller Pteranodons.

=== Theatre II film ===
Leaving the diorama, the vehicles enter a second theatre where they reassemble back into their original theatre seating formation. After listening to a brief prehistoric broadcast from KNRG News Radio (which featured the voices of Willard Scott and Chris Berman), guests view a fourteen-minute live-action film on three giant wrap around screens in which Bill Nye takes Ellen on an in-depth look at various current and future energy resources across the United States. (Actor Michael Richards makes a brief cameo as a caveman). Ellen chooses to return to the Jeopardy! game during its Double Jeopardy! round. Albert Einstein receives a light bulb and exits the game as he has no money at the end of the round, while Ellen and Judy are tied at $17,800.

=== Theatre I finale ===
When the vehicles return to Theater I and rotate back to their starting position, guests view a final three-minute scene in which the ladies compete in the Final Jeopardy! round. Asked what type of energy will never run out, Judy erroneously claims that no energy can ever run out, while Ellen correctly responds that brain power will never run out. Since both had bet everything, Judy ends up with $0, while Ellen becomes the Jeopardy! champion with a score of $35,600. Bill Nye and the studio employees have a party with her while balloons and confetti fall down. Ellen says she has become an energy expert and jokingly claims a dinosaur is nearby. As she says goodbye to the guests, a dinosaur roar can be heard, and the ride concludes.

=== Closure of the attraction ===
The ride's last day of operation was on August 13, 2017. Ironically, on the very last ride of the attraction, one of the ride vehicles ran out of battery mid-ride.

== Timeline ==
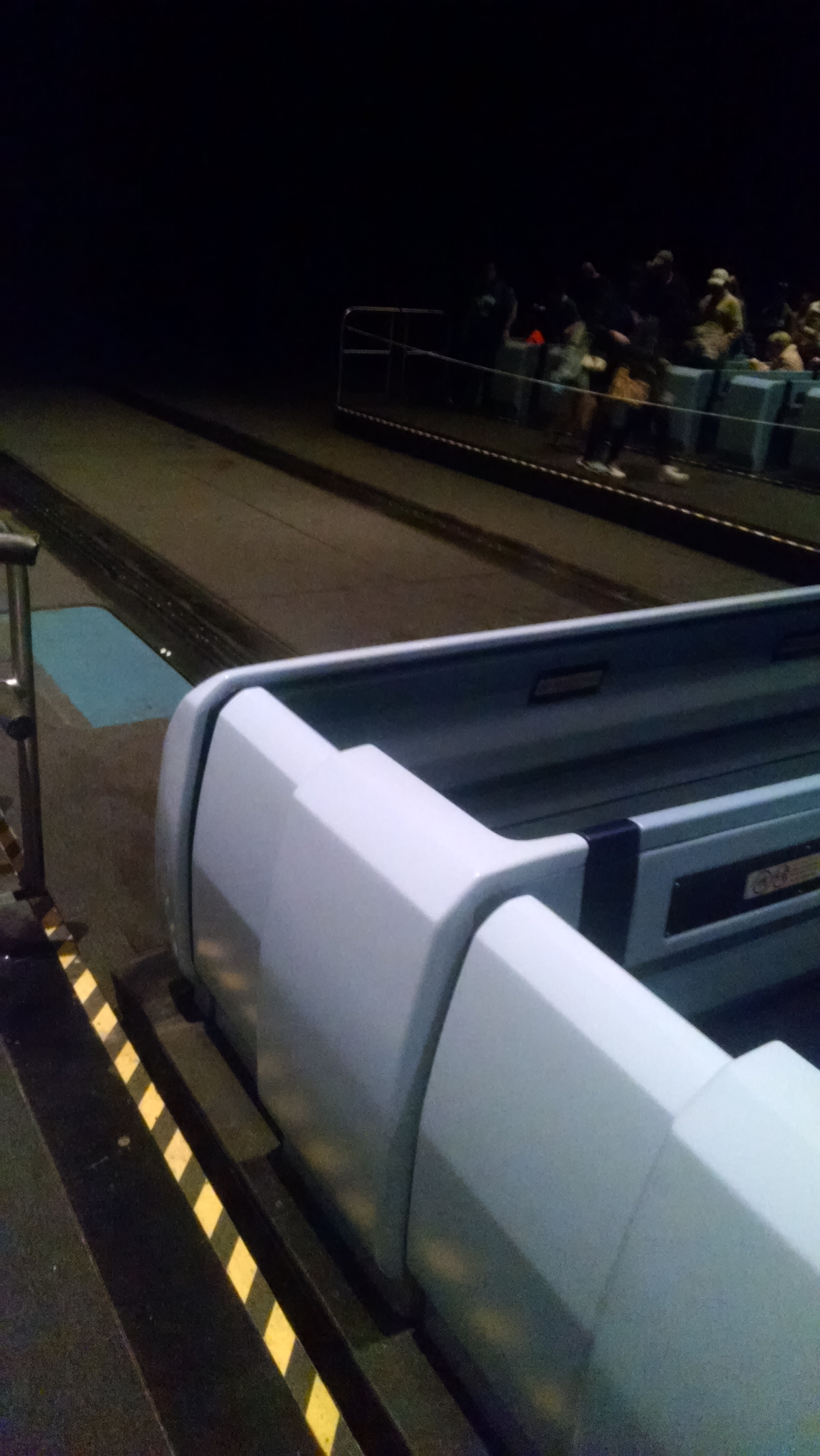
Ride vehicle and track

- October 1, 1982 — The pavilion opens with the original Universe of Energy show.
- November 1995 — Disney announces that the original Universe of Energy will undergo a makeover.
- January 21, 1996 — The original Universe of Energy show and pavilion are closed for refurbishment.
- April 1996 — Disney announces that the Universe of Energy remodel will be delayed.
- June 14, 1996 — The fully refurbished pavilion temporarily reopens in an effort to help handle the park's busy summer crowds. The original films from the original Universe of Energy show are used during this time while the new films with Bill Nye and Ellen DeGeneres are being completed.
- September 2, 1996 — The pavilion closes and the new films are installed.
- September 15, 1996 — The pavilion re-opens with a new show entitled Ellen's Energy Crisis, but for reasons unknown, is immediately renamed Ellen's Energy Adventure.
- 2001 — The original Universe of Energy marquees at the entrance of the pavilion are replaced with all new signage to reflect the sponsor's new name, ExxonMobil.
- 2004 — ExxonMobil drops its 22-year sponsorship of the pavilion, and all references to the company are removed from the signage and show.
- 2008 — The pavilion closes for an extensive refurbishment. During this time, numerous scenes within the diorama are refreshed, the audio systems are upgraded and the computer systems that operate the attraction are updated. Additionally, the exterior of the pavilion is repainted back to its original 1982 color scheme of reds, oranges and yellows (during the 1996 refurbishment, the exterior of the pavilion was repainted into a pastel rainbow color scheme) and the traveling theatre vehicles are repainted from their original purple color into a light blue color.
- March 28, 2009 — The pavilion re-opens after a lengthy refurbishment.
- July 15, 2017 — Disney confirms that the Universe of Energy pavilion will close and be replaced by a Guardians of the Galaxy themed attraction.
- August 13, 2017 — The Universe of Energy pavilion has its last day of operation. During the final show, the attraction broke down, forcing guests to evacuate mid-show. While cast members initially reassured guests they would get to re-ride and somewhat allowed guests to linger in the primeval diorama during the ride evacuation and take photos with the dinosaurs, due to the complexity of the breakdown they were not able to re-ride.

== See also ==
- Epcot attraction and entertainment history
- Cinerama
- Primeval World
