= All the Way to the Ocean =

- Directed by: Doug Rowell
- Written by: Joel Harper; Pete Michels; Doug Rowell
- Produced by: Joel Harper; Doug Rowell; Geoff Gougion; Joshua Newman
- Starring: Amy Smart; Xavier Rudd; Katie Leigh; Brenda Canela
- Narrated by: Marcia Cross
- Edited by: Andres Martinez; Michael D'Ambrosio
- Music by: Ben Harper; Burning Spear; Jack Johnson; Joel Harper
- Production companies: Freedom Three Publishing; Mediatavern; Faro Media Group
- Distributed by: Vimeo iTunes
- Release date: April 22, 2016 (première on Vimeo)
- Running time: 14 minutes
- Country: United States
- Language: English

All the Way to the Ocean is a 2016 animated short film based on the children's book of the same name by Joel Harper. The screenplay was written by Joel Harper, Pete Michels, and Doug Rowell. The film was directed by Doug Rowell and produced by Joel Harper. The film is narrated by American actress Marcia Cross and features the song With My Own Two Hands by Ben Harper (brother of) Joel Harper. This is an alternate version of the original song featuring Jack Johnson and is also featured on the Curious George film soundtrack Sing-A-Longs and Lullabies for the Film Curious George. The lyrics focus on how changes in the world can come about when a single person decides to take action. The song's popularity in Europe was such that Ben Harper was awarded French Rolling Stone Magazine's "Artist of the Year" (Artiste De L'Année) in 2003. The film also features music by Joel Harper and Burning Spear with their collaboration on the song The Time is Now. The film stars voice-overs by actress and activist Amy Smart and Australian musician Xavier Rudd.

== Plot ==
A story about two best friends, Isaac and James (voiced by Katie Leigh), and their discovery of the cause and effect relationship between our cities' storm drains and the world's oceans, lakes and rivers. In the story, James throws a wrapper and plastic bottle in the gutter and doesn't believe that it will go all the way to the ocean. His friend Isaac warns James about the consequences of his littering. There begins the adventures of James and Isaac as they learn about the harmful effects of storm drain pollution, and in turn, spread the word to their friends and the rest of their school. Helping the kids along this journey is a concerned Crane (voiced by Xavier Rudd) from the coastline, a surprisingly insightful Surfer Dude and James' Mom (voiced by Amy Smart).

== Awards ==
2022 Sylvia Earle Ocean Conservation Award - Inspiring the Future (My Hero in Partnership with One World One Ocean)

2017 Official Selection - Wild & Scenic Film Festival.
