= Katie Leigh =

American voice actress

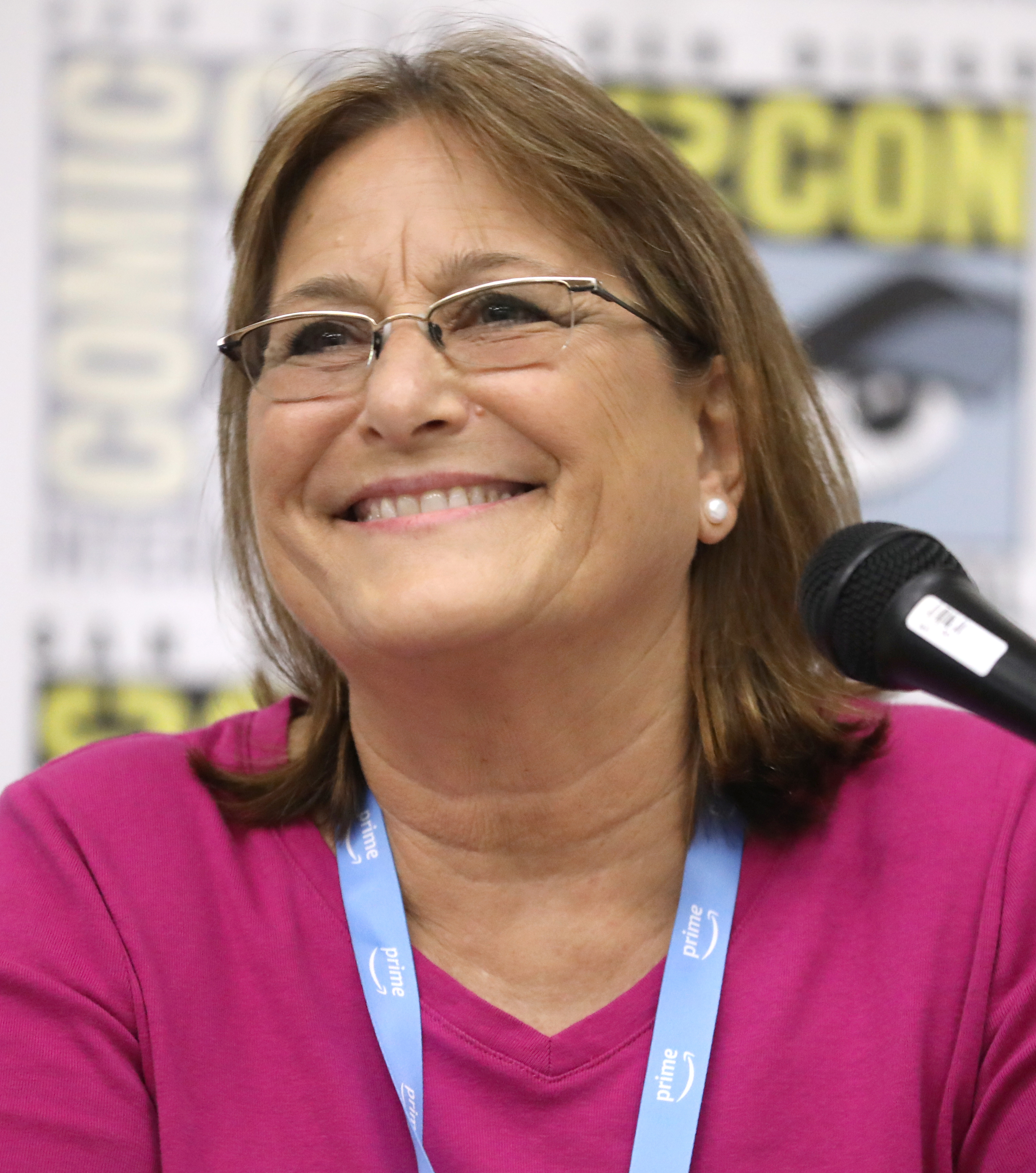
- Leigh in 2023
- Born: Carmel-by-the-Sea, California, U.S.
- Occupation: Voice actress
- Years active: 1981–present
- Agent: WMA
- Website: katieleigh.com

Katie Leigh is an American voice actress. She has performed in television, film and, occasionally, video game roles.

== Career ==
Katie Leigh is known for her voice roles such as Sunni Gummi in Disney's Adventures of the Gummi Bears, Zuzu in Poppy Cat, Alex in the first two seasons of Totally Spies!, and as Connie Kendall in the Focus on the Family radio program Adventures in Odyssey since 1987 and is one of two remaining original cast members of the show (the other being Chris Anthony). She also did the voice of the 2010 Red Rover electronic game.

== Personal life ==
Leigh identifies as a Christian.

== Filmography ==
=== Film ===
- A Martian Christmas — Roxy
- Babe: Pig in the City — Kitten
- My Little Pony: The Movie — Fizzy, Baby Sundance
- Surviving: A Family in Crisis — ADR for Heather O'Rourke
- Puss in Boots: A Furry Tail — Voice of Queen Marie
- Tappy Toes — Voice of Pingo
- Gallavants — Voice of Koosh
- Monster Island — Carlotta, Patrick's Mom
- Monster Hunter: Legends of the Guild — Elder Daazeel
- Mummy, I'm a Zombie — Piroska, Miss Peachfeather
- Sailor Moon Cosmos — Sailor Iron Mouse
- The Greatest Thing Ever: A Garden Cartoon Movie - Grace

=== Television ===
- The Adventures of the Little Prince — Little Prince (English dub)
- The Adventures of Raggedy Ann and Andy — Sunny Bunny, French Doll
- Aladdin — Additional Voices
- All—New Dennis the Menace — Gina Gillotti, Joey MacDonald
- All the Way to the Ocean — James
- Animalia — Zoe, Fushia Fox, Snipsy Alligator
- As Told By Ginger — Jr. Harris and Jr. Harris Jr.
- B—Daman CrossFire — Riki's Teacher, Simon Sumiya
- Blue Dragon — Noi
- Bonkers — Additional Voices
- Danger Rangers — Adam
- Darkwing Duck — Honker Muddlefoot
- Doc McStuffins – Tiny Tessie
- Dogtanian and the Three Muskehounds — Juliette
- Dumbo's Circus — Dumbo, Additional Voices
- Dungeons & Dragons — Sheila the Thief
- Disney's Adventures of the Gummi Bears — Sunni Gummi, Additional Voices
- Get Blake! — Skye Gunderson
- Hey Duggee — Additional Voices
- Hi Hi Puffy AmiYumi — King Chad, Madame Blubbery, Pierre, Parsephus
- It's Punky Brewster — additional Voices
- Kampung Boy — Mat
- Lego Star Wars: The Padawan Menace — "Ian"/Mari Amithest/Ashla
- Little Angels — Michael, Hayley
- Little Wizards — Voice
- The Mr. Men Show — Little Miss Chatterbox, Little Miss Daredevil, Little Miss Helpful
- Jim Henson's Muppet Babies — Baby Rowlf, Mrs. Mitchell
- My Little Pony — Sundance, Fizzy, Baby Shady, Additional Voices
- Olivia — Lily, Daisy, Additional Voices
- Pandamonium — Peggy
- Poochie — Danny Evans
- Poppy Cat — Zuzu (US dub)
- Pound Puppies — Additional Voices (season 2)
- ProStars — Additional Voices
- Puppy in My Pocket: Adventures in Pocketville — Mela
- Rainbow Butterfly Unicorn Kitty — Athena the Owl
- The Real Ghostbusters — Jason, Cindy
- Richie Rich (1996 TV series) — Richie, Irona
- Robot Man & Friends — Stellar
- Rugrats — Additional Voices
- Sailor Moon Sailor Stars — Sailor Iron Mouse
- Slimer! And the Real Ghostbusters — Jason
- Space Racers — Sojourner, Sandpiper, Crow
- Super Crooks - Ruby Red (English dub)
- The Buzz on Maggie — Additional Voices
- The Elusive Samurai — Yoritsugu Suwa
- The Glo Friends
- The Smurfs — Denisa
- Totally Spies! — Alex (main role; 52 episodes)
- Yo-kai Watch — Usapyon
- Zatch Bell! — Pamoon

=== Radio ===
- Adventures in Odyssey — Connie Kendall (1987–present)

=== Video games ===
- Deus Ex: The Fall — Camila Cardoso, Receptionist Xng, Junkie, Civilians
- EverQuest II — Lisori, Frizi Figglesnip
- Giana Sisters: Twisted Dreams — Giana/Punk Giana, Maria
- Grim Fandango — Bibi, Makeup Woman
- Indiana Jones and the Temple of Doom — Maharajah
- Infamous 2 — Female Pedestrians
- Infamous: Festival of Blood — Female Pedestrians
- Lost Odyssey — Soldier
- Nerf N-Strike — Komodo
- Off The Record: The Italian Affair — Girl.
- Palace Pets — Blondie
- Shenmue III — Additional Cast
- Star Ocean: First Departure — Millie Chliette
- Zatch Bell! Mamodo Fury — Pamoon
- Palace Pets App — Matey and Blondie
- Mystery Case Files: The Black Veil — Allison Sterling

=== Web ===
- The Garden - Grace

== Author ==
- Adventures in Odyssey
