= Marcia Cross =

American actress (born 1962)

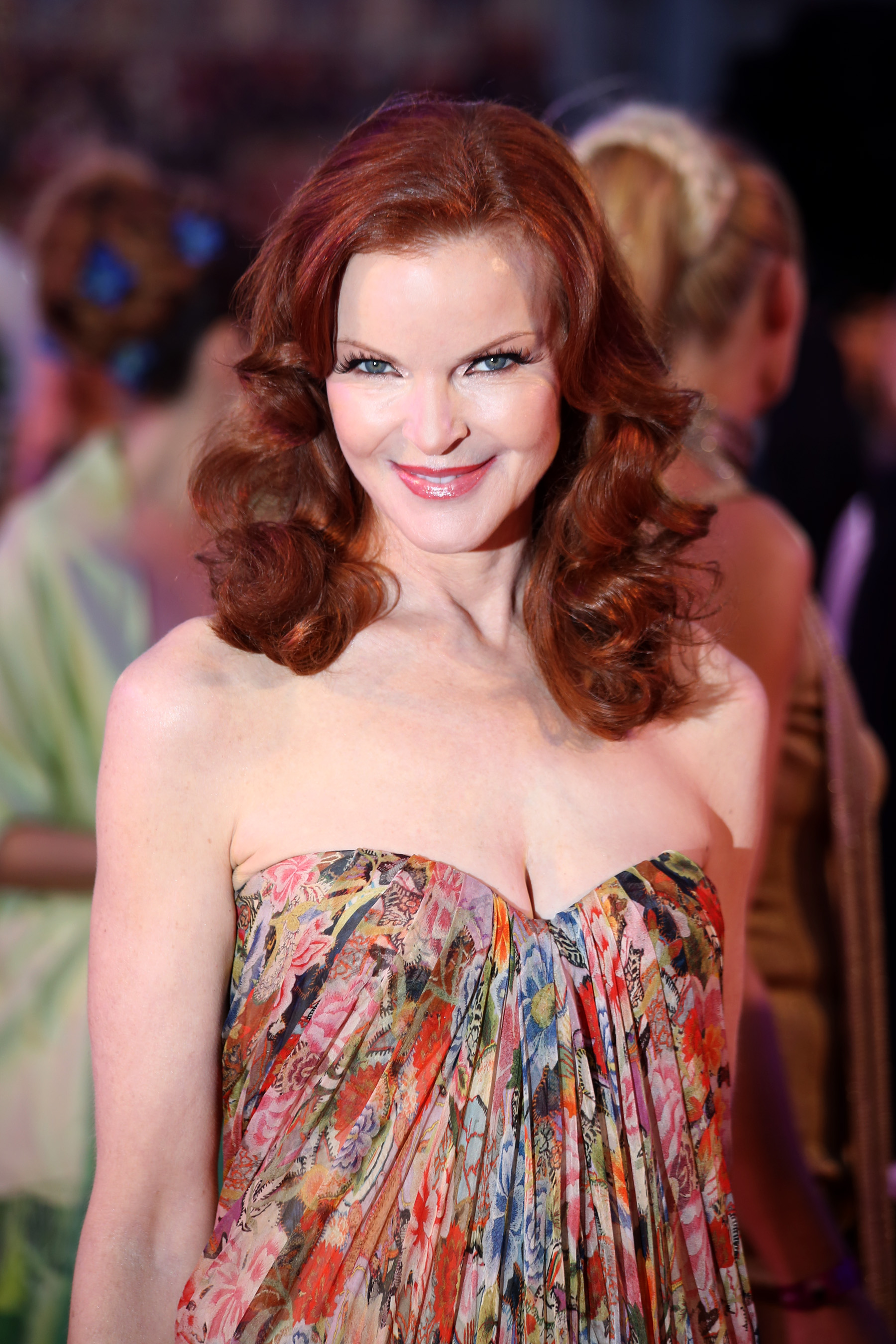
- Cross in 2014
- Born: March 25, 1962 (age 64)
- Education: Juilliard School (BFA); Antioch University, Los Angeles (MS)
- Occupation: Actress
- Years active: 1984–present
- Works: Full list
- Spouse: Tom Mahoney (m. 2006)
- Partner: Richard Jordan (1985–1993)
- Children: 2
- Awards: Full list

Marcia Cross (born March 25, 1962) is an American actress. A graduate of Juilliard, she started acting in the 1980s with roles on the daytime soap operas The Edge of Night (1984), Another World (1986), and One Life to Live (1986–1988), before taking on roles in the primetime soaps Knots Landing (1991–1992) and as Kimberly Shaw on Melrose Place (1992–1997).

Cross garnered wider recognition for her portrayal of Bree Van de Kamp in the ABC television series Desperate Housewives (2004–2012), for which she received various accolades including a Satellite Award, two Actor Awards and nominations for three Golden Globes and the Primetime Emmy Award for Outstanding Lead Actress in a Comedy Series. She subsequently had a recurring role as President Claire Haas in the ABC series Quantico (2015–2017).

== Early life ==
Marcia Cross was born on March 25, 1962. She grew up in Marlborough, Massachusetts. She is of English and Irish descent as the youngest of three daughters of Janet (née Slamin), a teacher, and Mark J. Cross, a personnel manager. Cross was raised Catholic. She graduated from Marlborough High School in 1980 and received a half-scholarship to Juilliard. She completed college in 1984 earning a B.F.A. in Acting. Cross returned to school in 1997 receiving a master's degree in psychology from Antioch University Los Angeles in 2003.

== Career ==
Cross began her acting career in 1984 on the soap opera The Edge of Night, playing the recurring role of Liz Correll. Afterwards, she relocated from New York to Los Angeles, and soon landed roles in television movies such as The Last Days of Frank and Jesse James, co-starring with Johnny Cash and Kris Kristofferson. In 1986, she joined the cast of the daytime soap opera One Life to Live, where she played the role of Kate Sanders, until 1987. She followed this with guest roles on primetime shows such as Who's the Boss?, Quantum Leap, Knots Landing, It's Garry Shandling's Show, and Cheers.

In 1992, Cross was cast as Dr. Kimberly Shaw in the primetime soap opera Melrose Place. She left in the fifth season. She also appeared in sitcoms such as Seinfeld, Boy Meets World, Ally McBeal, Spin City and The King of Queens. Her dramatic roles include appearances on CSI, Strong Medicine, Profiler and Touched by an Angel. Her film credits include Bad Influence (1990), Always Say Goodbye (1996), Just Peck (2009) and Bringing Up Bobby (2011). In 2003, Cross spent a season co-starring as Linda Abbott on the TV series Everwood.

In 2004, Cross starred in the role of Bree Van de Kamp in Desperate Housewives. The show was one of the breakout hits of the 2004–2005 television season, and Cross was nominated for several awards for her role, including an Emmy Award, three Golden Globe Awards, and five Screen Actors Guild Awards (winning two with cast). She also received a Satellite Award for her performance in the show's second season. The series ran for eight seasons until 2012. In 2014, after two years on hiatus, Cross co-starred as the lead character's mother in the unsuccessful comedy pilot Fatrick.

In 2015, Cross guest-starred with Robert Vaughn in an episode of Law & Order: Special Victims Unit, and later she joined the cast of the thriller series Quantico, playing the recurring role of President Claire Haas, a former Democratic vice presidential nominee.

== Personal life ==
As a child, Cross showed an early interest in performing. She took piano and dance lessons at the Ceil Sharon School of Dance, and was her high school's mascot at school games. Her first acting role was in grade school, in a dramatic adaptation of The Witch of Blackbird Pond.

=== Relationships ===
Cross was the long-time companion of actor Richard Jordan, who was 25 years her senior; Jordan died from a brain tumor in 1993. In 2006, she married stockbroker Tom Mahoney. Cross underwent in vitro fertilization soon after their wedding, and gave birth to fraternal twin daughters in February 2007, aged 44.

=== Activism ===
In September 2018, Cross revealed she had been in remission for eight months after receiving treatment for anal cancer. She explained months later that she had decided to "put a dent in the stigma" because she had discovered through online research that anal cancer patients were embarrassed about their diagnosis. "I found myself in a position where nobody wants this job. Nobody wants to come forward. And I knew that people were suffering and people were ashamed," she said at the 2019 The Atlantic's People v. Cancer event. She advocates for open discussions and further public information about the HPV infection, which can cause cancers of the anus, cervix, penis, and throat: "In spite of the optics, I care deeply about saving lives. To that end, the important thing to do is educate the public about HPV."

Cross expressed support for a ceasefire in the Gaza war, citing the Israeli bombing of the Gaza Strip, including on healthcare facilities. In an Instagram post, she stated: "I'm struggling to comprehend how to live among people with eyes that don't water, hearts that don't flinch, and voices that remain silent. There are no words for the horror that has and is being unleashed. And the silence has me believing I am deaf." In September 2025, she signed an open pledge with Film Workers for Palestine pledging not to work with Israeli film institutions "that are implicated in genocide and apartheid against the Palestinian people."
