= Station 19 season 7 =

Station 19
- Season 7
- Promotional poster for the seventh season of Station 19
- Showrunners: Peter Paige; Zoanne Clack
- Starring: Jaina Lee Ortiz; Jason George; Boris Kodjoe; Grey Damon; Barrett Doss; Jay Hayden; Danielle Savre; Stefania Spampinato; Carlos Miranda; Josh Randall; Merle Dandridge
- No. of episodes: 10

Release
- Original network: ABC
- Original release: March 14 – May 30, 2024

Season chronology
- ← Previous; Season 6

The seventh and final season of the American television action-drama Station 19, spin off of Grey's Anatomy, began airing in the United States on the American Broadcasting Company (ABC) on March 14, 2024. The season was produced by ABC Signature, in association with Shondaland Production Company.

Pat Healy does not return from the previous season. This is the only season under showrunners Zoanne Clack and Peter Paige.

Station 19 centers around the professional and personal lives of the firefighters of the fictional Station 19 of the Seattle Fire Department. Several plot points connect to parent series Grey's Anatomy through fictional crossover events.

== Episodes ==
List of Station 19 season 7 episodes
No. overall	No. in season	Title	Directed by	Written by	Original release date	Prod. code	U.S. viewers (millions)
96	1	"This Woman's Work"	Paris Barclay	Henry Robles	March 14, 2024	701	2.79
At Grey Sloan, Gibson undergoes brain surgery where a piece of his skull is removed. Andy is informed that Gibson has scarring on his brain and is unlikely to return to duty as a firefighter. She has visions of Jack saying that she could not protect him, but she declares that she will be a good captain. Carina is caring for Nanette's baby at the hospital after his mother dies. Bishop suggests they adopt him, and she agrees. Travis goes to express his condolences at Michael Dixon's house and encounters his son Emmett. As they comfort each other, they end up having sex. Chief Ross makes a deal with Mayor Osman to keep her job after her romance with Sullivan was revealed. Sullivan tells Ross that he plans to propose marriage. Hughes and Ruiz go on a Crisis One call where a former employee tries to blow up her former workplace. They are able to evacuate everyone, but Hughes could not prevent the explosion. Ruiz confesses that he kissed Kate immediately after they broke up, but Hughes seems unconcerned.
97	2	"Good Grief"	Tessa Blake	Meghann Plunkett	March 21, 2024	702	2.62
Gibson learns he cannot return as a firefighter, so he cleans out his locker and leaves. Andy plans a dinner to honor him. Hughes and Beckett go to a bar for a wake for Beckett's uncle. His family teases him for not drinking. Beckett no longer wants to be involved with his family, so Hughes offers to partner with him on Crisis One. Warren and Ruiz are called to a house when a complaint is made about fighting. The neighbor warns that the son has guns. Ben sees that the mother has injuries, but they decline help and ask them to leave. Travis attends Dixon's funeral with Eli. When Eli leaves early, Travis has sex with Emmett. Later, Kitty says Dixon liked him and thought was a good man. At clinic day at the station, a nanny has a rash and fever. She and Carina are quarantined to a private room, and she is diagnosed with Dengue fever, which is not contagious. Later, Carina is served because a previous patient is suing her for malpractice. Andy figures out that Gibson planned to avoid his dinner, so she has Ruiz and Warren pick him up, so they could properly honor him.
98	3	"True Colors"	Peter Paige	Staci Okunola	March 28, 2024	703	2.48
The firefighters are preparing to volunteer at a pride parade. Travis' father and his boyfriend meet with Travis and Eli there. Travis disapproves of their lifestyle, which concerns Eli. Later, Travis confesses that he cheated on Eli with Emmett. They break up, and Eli tells Travis that he needs to feel good about himself. Maya notices that one of the counter-protesters is her brother. On a float, Mayor Osman tells Chief Ross that she needs to cut the department budget or she will be replaced. Chaos erupts between the parade-goers and the protesters, and Warren, Sullivan, and Ruiz control the crowd and treat injuries. Travis rescues his father and his boyfriend and apologizes. At the station, Beckett treats a man who took weight-loss injections to fit into his parade costume. At home, Carina is overwhelmed with the baby and the lawsuit and gets help from Bailey. Later, the crew has a party at the station to celebrate pride.
99	4	"Trouble Man"	Stefania Spampinato	Mellow Brown & Sybil Azur	April 4, 2024	704	2.57
Ross tells Andy she needs to cut costs at the station. At home, Carina and Maya argue over parenting styles. Carina says she still wants to get pregnant, and Maya accepts. After a call, Hughes blurts out to everyone that Ruiz kissed Kate after they broke up. When Travis asks how she is, she says she is fine. After coming back from a call at a sewage treatment plant, Travis notices that Warren has been struggling since returning to duty. Andy has everyone audit supplies. Ruiz and Sullivan are concerned about why Andy is ordering an audit. Later, they are overwhelmed at a streetcar derailment. Hughes encounters Kate, which causes her to cry and sleep in a bunk, missing the next call. The crew goes to a diner on fire. Beckett, Sullivan, Travis, and Ruiz go inside to stop a gas leak and rescue the owner trapped in the freezer. Ruiz tries to plug the gas line, but an explosion occurs. They are overwhelmed and fail to save the owner. Returning to the station, Hughes apologizes, and Andy gives her a warning. Ruiz resigns to ensure everyone else gets to keep their jobs.
100	5	"My Way"	Daryn Okada	Emily Culver & Alex Fernandez	April 11, 2024	705	2.40
Carina goes to a doctor's appointment. She witnesses an accident and goes to help. Ruiz, now working for a private ambulance company, and his partner Dominic also arrive to help. Meanwhile, Ross tells Hughes that Crisis One will be cut from the budget. The firefighters respond to a call. They notice that Gibson is the dispatcher. At the Space Needle, a fire is in a building across the street and an elevator has halted in the tower. Hughes is sent to rappel down to the elevator. Hughes uses her Crisis One skills to manage the situation and maintain order. Meanwhile, Sullivan and Warren are searching for the source of the electrical fire. By the time they find it, they run out of air, and they call a mayday. Andy has an idea to extinguish the fire and rescues them. Afterwards, the firefighters stand behind Mayor Osman at a press conference. Hughes interrupts to credit Crisis One. Andy sends her home. Later, Sullivan proposes to Ross, and she accepts. Carina says her eggs are no longer viable, so Maya volunteers her eggs. The station has a ceremony where Maya pins a badge to Andy to officially make her captain.
101	6	"With So Little to Be Sure Of"	Boris Kodjoe	Rochelle Zimmerman	May 2, 2024	706	2.16
Mayor Osman and Ross debate whether Hughes should keep her job. Over the past year, homeless veterans Arlo and Morris come to the station for help. Hughes and Morris form a friendship. Over time, Arlo is unable to manage his diabetes and dies. Sullivan tries to get Morris into VA housing but is tied up in bureaucracy. On a Crisis One call, Hughes finds Morris experiencing PTSD and calms him down. Later, Morris gets a housing interview appointment. Hughes finds Morris wandering in the street. The city has cleared his encampment and destroyed his paperwork and documentation, so he cannot go to the appointment. In the present, Warren is taking testosterone to keep up with the others. Maya is taking hormones to harvest her eggs. The firefighters are called to a fire at Morris' encampment. They try to get Morris out, but he dies. Following protocol, Hughes leads a debriefing so that they do not harm themselves. Hughes has a breakdown regarding herself and Crisis One. Travis comforts her. Afterwards, Ross tell Hughes that she still has a job. The crew go to bury Morris.
102	7	"Give It All"	David Greenspan	Leah Gonzalez & Heidi-Marie Ferren	May 9, 2024	707	2.31
Maya is performing house inspections. She finds her brother's apartment and confronts him about the incident at the pride parade. He says that the protesters are his family. When he learns that Maya is bisexual and does not accept it, Maya decides to leave him. Bailey learns Warren is taking testosterone and is fine with it but wonders why Warren would hide it. The firefighters are called to the woods where they see a plume of smoke. A group of Native Americans tries to stop them because it is a ceremony. It is the group that called them because there is a gender reveal party nearby that involves explosives. When an explosion causes a fire, the crew teams with the tribal fire department to put out the fire. They learn that the tribal department receives funding from many sources. Because Andy still needs to make budget cuts, Hughes suggests cutting Crisis One and getting funding from elsewhere. Meanwhile, Ruiz and Dominic bring a construction worker to the station because she cannot afford to go to a hospital where they run into Travis and Hughes. Later, Travis and Dominic flirt with each other, and Ruiz and Hughes have sex.
103	8	"Ushers of the New World"	Letia Solomon	Shernold Edwards & Beresford Bennett	May 16, 2024	708	1.93
Maya's fertilized eggs are implanted into Carina. Hughes is making calls to fund Crisis One. A foundation agrees to partner with her and expand it nationally, but she needs to relocate to Washington, D.C. At the station, the firefighters treat a group of migrants would were sent there from the border. Warren's adopted son, Joey, is with him because he dropped out of college. He complains that college is not beneficial to him, and he feels guilty because his adoption gave him more opportunities than other people. After helping Warren all day, he tells Joey that he should take advantage of those opportunities, so he can help those left behind. Ross's Korean sister, Jinny, visits and shadows her all day at the station. She disapproves of her engagement with Sullivan and is surprise to learn that he and Andy were once married. She feels that Ross is abandoning her Korean heritage, but Ross defends her relationship, saying that Sullivan supports her. At their engagement party that night, Jinny asks for forgiveness and learns that Sullivan secretly made Ross's favorite Korean dish. Ruiz learns that Hughes may move to D.C., which saddens him.
104	9	"How Am I Supposed to Live Without You"	Tessa Blake	Zaiver Sinnett	May 23, 2024	709	2.40
A wildfire is on the outskirts of Seattle. Hughes decides to move to D.C. and is trying to comfort Travis because he is staying. The firefighters are called to help with the fire. Carina is there to triage victims. They go out to fight the fire and retrieve victims. Ruiz, Dominic, and Kate have been ordered to protect a single building in the fire zone by their company. However, Ruiz and Dominic abandon their posts to help the others. Warren brings a victim to the medical tent and is forced to perform a medical procedure without waiting for Carina. That night, the crew sleeps on top of their engine, and reflect on their time together. The next day, Ross joins them in the field. Ruiz sees that a branch is about to fall and hit Travis. He pushes him out the way, but the branch falls and crushes Ruiz's leg. A helicopter is sent to evacuate him, and Warren accompanies him. At Grey Sloan, Carina learns that she is pregnant. Andy and Maya are looking for a victim when, suddenly, the fire surrounds Maya. Note : This episode begins a crossover event that continues on Grey's Anatomy season 20 episode 10 and concludes on Station 19 season 7 episode 10.
105	10	"One Last Time"	Peter Paige	Teleplay by : Zoanne Clack; Story by : José Díaz & Miriam Arghandiwal	May 30, 2024	710	2.90
At Grey Sloan, Ruiz is about to go into surgery. Warren returns to duty, and Carina follows him because the victim is pregnant. Carina delivers a baby in the field while Warren performs a controlled burn. Meanwhile, a helicopter performs a water drop, and Maya is rescued. A fire tornado appears and kills Kate. The firefighters are surrounded and deploy their fire shelters for safety. When they are safe, they notice that Andy is missing. They go for help and find that Andy had gone and returned with another crew to fight the fire. Once the fire is under control, Andy collapses. At Grey Sloan, they learn she was dehydrated and had severe burns. Andy tells them she abandoned her shelter to find help so she could protect them. Carina finds Maya and tells her that she is pregnant. Three months later, Warren tells Andy he is returning to surgical residency. Ruiz is undergoing rehab. Hughes leaves for D.C., and Travis joins her at the airport. In the future, Maya is captain of Station 19 with Pru Miller-Warren as one of the firefighters. Chief Andy Herrera addresses them and tells them what it means to be part of this station. Note : This episode concludes a crossover event that begins on Station 19 season 7 episode 9 and continues on Grey's Anatomy season 20 episode 10.

== Cast and characters ==
=== Main ===
- Jaina Lee Ortiz as Captain Andrea "Andy" Herrera
- Jason George as Benjamin "Ben" Warren
- Boris Kodjoe as Robert Sullivan
- Grey Damon as Jack Gibson
- Barrett Doss as Victoria "Vic" Hughes
- Jay Hayden as Travis Montgomery
- Danielle Savre as Maya DeLuca-Bishop
- Stefania Spampinato as Dr. Carina DeLuca-Bishop
- Carlos Miranda as Theodore "Theo" Ruiz
- Josh Randall as Sean Beckett
- Merle Dandridge as Fire Chief Natasha Ross

=== Recurring ===
- Rob Heaps as Eli Stern
- Emerson Brooks as Mayor Robel Osman
- Kiele Sanchez as Kate Powell
- Chandra Wilson as Dr. Miranda Bailey
- Johnny Sibilly as Dominic Amaya

=== Notable guests ===
- Caterina Scorsone as Dr. Amelia Shepherd
- Lachlan Buchanan as Emmett Dixon
- Jayne Taini as Marsha Smith
- Tricia O'Kelley as Kitty Dixon
- Robert Curtis Brown as Paul Montgomery
- Jaicy Elliot as Dr. Taryn Helm
- Okieriete Onaodowan as Dean Miller
- BJ Tanner as William George "Tuck" Jones
- Tracie Thoms as Dr. Diane Lewis

== Production ==
=== Development ===
On April 20, 2023, ABC renewed the series for a seventh season. This is the only season under showrunners Zoanne Clack and Peter Paige after the departure of the previous showrunner Krista Vernoff at the end of the previous season. Clack joined Station 19 the previous season as an executive producer and head writer after working on parent series Grey's Anatomy. Paige began directing episodes starting with the fourth season and became an executive producer the previous season.

Paige stated that production would not commence until the conclusion of the 2023 Writers Guild of America strike. Clack stated that the number of episodes produced for the season would be reduced because of the strike. Following the end of the 2023 Hollywood labor disputes, it was expected that the season would consist of ten episodes. Without Vernoff, who also vacated her showrunner role on Grey's Anatomy, the storylines with the parent show were expected to separate, and only one crossover is planned for the season. Production began by December 2023. The same month, ABC announced that the seventh season of Station 19 will be its final season.

For the series' 100th episode, producers considered having an episode set in South Korea as part of an exchange program since two of the main characters are half-Korean. Due to the strikes, there was not enough time to produce the episode. Instead, the episode focused on an emergency at the Space Needle. Producers worked with representatives from the Space Needle to accurately recreate the structure as sets in Los Angeles.

=== Casting ===
The entire main cast from the previous season returned except for Pat Healy. Drag queen Symone was cast as Mary Mint, who is in a parade celebrating same-sex marriage in Washington. Johnny Sibilly was cast as Dominic, an EMS firefighter who has a "calming nature." Yunjin Kim was cast as Jeonghee "Jinny" Lee, the full-Korean sister of Natasha Ross, who knows what people should do with their lives. For the series finale, former series regular Okieriete Onaodowan made a cameo as Dean Miller. Former series regular Miguel Sandoval was asked to make an appearance, but he declined.

== Release ==
When the 2023–24 United States network television schedule was announced, Station 19 was held for midseason due to the 2023 Writers Guild of America strike. The season premiered on March 14, 2024 in the Thursday at 10 PM timeslot following parent series, Grey's Anatomy.

== Reception ==
=== Awards and nominations ===
Jay Hayden was named Performer of the Week by TVLine for his performance in "True Colors". Jaina Lee Ortiz received an honorable mention for TVLine Performer of the Week for her performance in "Trouble Man". Barrett Doss received an honorable mention for TVLine Performer of the Week for her performance in "One Last Time".

Writer Rochelle Zimmerman was nominated for a Humanitas Prize for her script to "With So Little to Be Sure of".

=== Ratings ===
The season was ABC's sixth most-watched scripted television series during the 2022–2023 television season in the 18-49 demographic. Throughout its broadcast, in same-day viewership, the season averaged a 0.28 rating (Note: In Nielsen ratings, a rating is a fraction of the total number of households with televisions compared to the number of television sets tuned into a specific program.) in the 18–49 demographic and 2.45 million viewers, down 40 and 36 percent, respectively, from the previous season. In Live+7 (Note: Live+7 data includes the number of viewers watching episodes within seven days of its original broadcast by means of DVR and streaming video on demand.) the season averaged a 0.5 rating in the 18–49 demographic and 4.0 million viewers, down 23 and 28 percent, respectively.

Viewership and ratings per episode of Station 19 season 7
No.	Title	Air date	Rating (18–49)	Viewers (millions)	DVR (18–49)	DVR viewers (millions)	Total (18–49)	Total viewers (millions)
1	"This Woman's Work"	March 14, 2024	0.4	2.79	0.2	1.79	0.6	4.58
2	"Good Grief"	March 21, 2024	0.3	2.62	—N/a	—N/a	—N/a	—N/a
3	"True Colors"	March 28, 2024	0.3	2.48	—N/a	—N/a	—N/a	—N/a
4	"Trouble Man"	April 4, 2024	0.3	2.57	—N/a	—N/a	—N/a	—N/a
5	"My Way"	April 11, 2024	0.3	2.40	—N/a	—N/a	—N/a	—N/a
6	"With So Little to Be Sure of"	May 2, 2024	0.2	2.16	—N/a	—N/a	—N/a	—N/a
7	"Give It All"	May 9, 2024	0.3	2.31	—N/a	—N/a	—N/a	—N/a
8	"Ushers of the New World"	May 16, 2024	0.2	1.93	—N/a	—N/a	—N/a	—N/a
9	"How Am I Supposed to Live Without You"	May 23, 2024	0.2	2.40	—N/a	—N/a	—N/a	—N/a
10	"One Last Time"	May 30, 2024	0.3	2.90	—N/a	—N/a	—N/a	—N/a
