= Station 19 season 6 =

Station 19
- Season 6
- Promotional poster for the sixth season of Station 19
- Showrunner: Krista Vernoff
- Starring: Jaina Lee Ortiz; Jason George; Boris Kodjoe; Grey Damon; Barrett Doss; Jay Hayden; Danielle Savre; Stefania Spampinato; Carlos Miranda; Josh Randall; Merle Dandridge; Pat Healy
- No. of episodes: 18

Release
- Original network: ABC
- Original release: October 6, 2022 – May 18, 2023

Season chronology
- ← Previous; Season 5 Next → Season 7

The sixth season of the American television action-drama Station 19, spin off of Grey's Anatomy, began airing in the United States on the American Broadcasting Company (ABC) on October 6, 2022. The season was produced by ABC Signature, in association with Shondaland Production Company and Trip the Light Productions.

Okieriete Onaodowan does not return from the previous season. This is the first season to feature Josh Randall and Merle Dandridge as series regulars after recurring the previous season. This is also the first season to feature Pat Healy as a series regular after recurring for the past several seasons. In April 2023, ABC renewed the series for a seventh season. It is the last season under showrunner Krista Vernoff.

Station 19 centers around the professional and personal lives of the firefighters of the fictional Station 19 of the Seattle Fire Department. Several plot points connect to parent series Grey's Anatomy through fictional crossover events.

== Episodes ==
List of Station 19 season 6 episodes
No. overall	No. in season	Title	Directed by	Written by	Original release date	Prod. code	U.S. viewers (millions)
78	1	"Twist and Shout"	Stacey K. Black	Krista Vernoff & Kiley Donovan	October 6, 2022	601	4.19
It is 6 months later. Herrera teaches a self defense class. Bishop and DeLuca are still trying to get pregnant. Gibson is trying to find his foster sister. Station 19 is called to a car crash and upon arrival, they notice an approaching tornado. Montgomery goes to a "meet the candidates" event. After the tornado threat passes, the team returns to the car crash only to discover that one of the cars, inside which a woman was wedged, is missing. The car ends up at the event and Montgomery rescues her from the car. Station 19 is then called to a house that turns out to be where Eva Vasquez lives and they find out that's where Gibson has been for the past 3 months. DeLuca finds out that Bishop blackmailed Chief Ross and they fight about it.
79	2	"Everybody's Got Something to Hide Except Me and My Monkey"	Peter Paige	Henry Robles	October 13, 2022	602	3.70
Herrera learns about Bishop's blackmailing. Gibson comes to the hospital where DeLuca takes care of his injury. The team is called to a building fire, but the hydrant is dry, so they drain the pool to get water. Gibson reveals to DeLuca that he indeed left to find his sibling and met with his brother Cal, but his brother did not remember him. Herrera makes up a story about the blackmailing to tell the rest of the team to cover for Bishop. Bishop tries to make amends with Beckett by giving him alcohol.
80	3	"Dancing with Our Hands Tied"	Tamika Miller	Daniel Arkin	October 20, 2022	603	3.90
Crisis One gets called to a potential domestic abuse, which turns out to be at the Dixon's house. Station 19 is called to a fire of an electric car. Vic persuades DeLuca to take a pregnancy test. Gibson fights with Eva.
81	4	"Demons"	Michael Medico	Emily Culver	October 27, 2022	604	3.87
The station is getting ready for Halloween. Sullivan meets Ross again. A man, Eli Stern, stops by station 19 to talk about Montgomery's campaign. Gibson starts having hallucinations involving Rigo Vasquez. Eva breaks up with Gibson. Aid Car is called to a fair, where a fire starts in the corn maze. Station 19 is holding a Halloween event for children and Gibson stops by.
82	5	"Pick Up the Pieces"	Jason George	Mellow Brown	November 3, 2022	605	3.52
Bishop and DeLuca finally make up. Hughes tries to spread the word about the girls fire camp. Information about Montgomery's intoxicated assault resurfaces, just before his union board meeting. Crisis One is called to a man who plans to die by suicide. Gibson comes to the Memorial Clinic. Station 19 is called to a factory with several people locked in a seal-tight chamber. A mysterious woman stalks Gibson while at the Clinic and hands DeLuca a file to give to Gibson. The man at the Crisis One call turns out to be the only person capable of opening the chamber. Gibson reveals the file is from his biological sister.
83	6	"Everybody Says Don't"	Daryn Okada	Rochelle Zimmerman	November 10, 2022	606	3.99
DeLuca admits to Bishop that she took a pregnancy test alone. Stern is now running Montgomery's campaign instead of Hughes. The station is starting their girls fire camp. Gibson stops by the station and Ross forces him to volunteer for the camp. Station 19 is called to a helicopter crash. Chief Ross is asking for opinions of Captain Beckett. While rescuing a man from the helicopter, the team revolts against Beckett, who makes Herrera the captain for the mission. Gibson tells Hughes about his sister. A man arrives to the station with several people struck by lightning in his car. Hughes asks the girls from girl camp to help with CPR. Ross asks Hughes to run Crisis One. Ross breaks things off with Sullivan. Bishop is getting increasingly more injured which impacts her work performance. Note : This episode begins a crossover event that concludes on Grey's Anatomy season 19 episode 6.
84	7	"We Build Then We Break"	Peter Paige	Zaiver Sinnett	February 23, 2023	607	3.97
The team fights a fire at Dr. Meredith Grey's house. Jack finds Maya injured at the station and takes her to Grey Sloan. Later, Andy and Vic are called to sedate a man who is resisting arrest by the police. They realize that the man does not understand the officers and declare it a Crisis One call. Both Ross and Dixon are called, and the circumstances escalate until Ross is able calm the situation and takes the man home. Sullivan tells Ross that he is willing to wait for her so that she can put her career first. Carina wants Maya to recover from her injuries and commits her to force treatment.
85	8	"I Know a Place"	Paula Hunziker	Leah Gonzalez	March 2, 2023	608	3.83
Bishop is having therapy with Dr. Diane Lewis. She has a breakthrough when she realizes that she has a need to win to avoid disappointing her father. Gibson is back on the team to fill in for Bishop. The firefighters receive a call to Ruiz's old neighborhood. When a woman rushes back into a burning house, Ruiz goes against orders and goes after her. Beckett benches Ruiz for disobeying. Hughes is worried that Ruiz could have died like Ripley did. Dixon is trying to use the previous incident with Ross, involving a possible police civil rights violation, to boost his mayoral campaign. At the press conference, Ross credits Crisis One instead and invites officers to receive the training. Herrera wants Beckett to improve his leadership, but it is revealed that Beckett continues to drink on the job.
86	9	"Come as You Are"	Tamika Miller	Staci Okunola	March 9, 2023	609	3.97
At the Memorial Clinic, DeLuca flirts with a pregnant woman that she is treating, and Gibson notices. Sullivan is treating a drunk man that Beckett wants to send to a hospital. It is revealed that the man is Beckett's uncle. Ruiz and Hughes are performing a fire inspection at a barbershop in Theo's old neighborhood. Hughes points out electrical violations, but Ruiz ignores her. When the power goes out, Hughes argues with Ruiz about how he acts differently in the old neighborhood, and he apologizes. Eli rides along with Herrera and Montgomery to get campaign footage and ends up injured. Eli asks Herrera out on a date, and she accepts. Bishop contacts DeLuca, but Carina needs more time apart.
87	10	"Even Better Than the Real Thing"	Paris Barclay	Alex Fernandez	March 16, 2023	610	4.30
Stations 19 and 88 are running a training exercise led by Beckett. Cooper, from Station 88, used to serve under Beckett and calls him a great captain. An accident occurs during the exercise, and Copper is injured and later dies. Ruiz asserts that Beckett's drinking led to Cooper's death. Meanwhile, Gibson's biological sister, Brooke, and her friend come to the station injured after driving while intoxicated. Gibson disapproves, which upsets Brooke. However, after her friend loses consciousness and is sent to the hospital, they forgive each other. Montgomery is conducting radio interviews with Eli from Herrera's apartment. He excels after learning to speak from the heart instead of from a script. Eli later comes to the station to return Herrera's keys, and they kiss. Bishop makes a lasagna for DeLuca, who ends up with food poisoning, so Maya goes to take care of her.
88	11	"Could I Leave You?"	Michael Medico	Rochelle Zimmerman & Beresford Bennett	March 23, 2023	611	3.88
The team gets a call for a fire at the barbershop in Ruiz's old neighborhood. Fearing Beckett's mental state, the team decides to ignore him and lets Herrera take command of the situation. Beckett chooses to run into the shop to rescue a man and nearly dies. Meanwhile, Hughes and Dr. Diane Lewis are meeting for Crisis One, and DeLuca comes to see Bishop. A car comes into the station with a dead deer in the windshield, and the three rescue the woman inside. After hearing the woman's story, DeLuca worries she will be hurt if she stays with Bishop. Maya confesses to Warren that she gave alcohol to Beckett. Ross makes sure that the investigation into Beckett's involvement in the training accident is impartial. Beckett announces that he is taking a leave of absence.
89	12	"Never Gonna Give You Up"	Kelly Park	Meghann Plunkett	March 30, 2023	612	3.76
Ross is reprimanding the team when they get a call about a man and woman who fell inside a cave. Ross takes command, and Montgomery and Bishop repel down to rescue them. Bishop hears over the radio that an incident has occurred at Grey Sloan. The woman, who is live-streaming the whole time, is rescued by Montgomery, which give him more publicity. At the station, Warren treats a man who was bitten by a black widow spider, and he tells Ben about the riot at Grey Sloan. Ruiz and Hughes perform an informal arson investigation at the barbershop, and they ask the officials to look into similar incidents in the neighborhood. Ross wants Herrera to be acting captain, but Andy declines and recommends Sullivan. Instead, Ross names Ruiz acting captain. Bishop and Warren rush to Grey Sloan to check on their spouses.
90	13	"It's All Gonna Break"	David Greenspan	Benjamin Hayes	April 6, 2023	613	3.70
The firefighters are called to a house being demolished. Two brothers are fighting inside, putting Gibson and Hughes in danger. Ruiz is micro-managing the situation, and Hughes does not have time to update him. Sullivan offers a solution, which goes against protocol, but everyone is saved after Ruiz relents. Ruiz and Hughes argue about their inability to communicate. Meanwhile, Bailey, DeLuca, and Warren are at a crisis pregnancy center with Carina posing as a pregnant woman. They are trying to obtain evidence that the people working there are not medical professionals. They are discovered, but see protestors outside the building who share their view. Montgomery is at a debate when he notices an exposed cable. He tapes the cable in front of the audience and uses it as a metaphor for how he will fix the city as mayor. Eli and Montgomery celebrate his performance and end up having sex. Dixon shows Bishop photos of Sullivan and Ross in bed together.
91	14	"Get It All Out"	Stacey K. Black	Peter Paige	April 13, 2023	614	3.91
The team is making dinner to celebrate Ruiz's captaincy when they are called, and Gibson accidentally leaves a burner on. When they return, the sprinklers have ruined the food. Ruiz accuses Herrera of undermining him, but she tells him that she had previously declined the offer to be captain. Ross learns that Sullivan is considering a position in another city because he was passed over for captain. Warren and Bishop are called to rescue a trapped pregnant woman, who previously flirted with DeLuca. Carina is called when she needs to deliver the baby. Montgomery is anxious when he finds that he could realistically become mayor. He decides to drop out and endorse another progressive candidate, which angers Eli. Herrera finds out that Montgomery and Eli slept together, and Travis learns that Eli and Andy kissed. Bishop tells DeLuca and Herrera about the photos of Ross and Sullivan. Gibson helps four boys after they get sick due to ingesting spicy chips.
92	15	"What Are You Willing to Lose"	Paris Barclay	Zaiver Sinnett & Henry Robles	April 20, 2023	615	3.96
Herrera and Bishop show Ross the photos of her and Sullivan. Dixon wants Ross's endorsement in exchange for his silence about the photos. Ross goes to the firefighters union and admits her relationship with Sullivan. Bishop and DeLuca treat an injured woman while they are on a date. The team is called to a fire at an overcrowded clean-living house. Warren falls through the roof while inspecting it and breaks his arm. He finds two men trapped in the house, but he can only carry one of them out before Ruiz calls a retreat. A firefighter named Kate Powell, who knows Ruiz, substitutes for Warren while he is injured.
93	16	"Dirty Laundry"	Danielle Savre	Emily Culver	May 4, 2023	616	3.79
The mayor has called on Ross to resign, which she plans to do. Herrera convinces her to fight for her position to keep her legacy intact. Warren continues to feel guilty for not saving a man who was trapped in the fire on the previous episode. His friend, whom he saved, is in the hospital, and Warren stays by his bedside. When he wakes up, he angrily kicks out Warren, and Ben has a breakdown. Beckett returns to the station on probation. He apologizes to the team and confesses that he feels guilty that he may have caused his friend's death. He announces that he would not be seeking his captaincy back, and his behavior worries Hughes. At the scene of a multi vehicle accident, jealousy and resentments flare up.
94	17	"All These Things That I've Done"	Yangzom Brauen	Staci Okunola & Leah Gonzalez	May 11, 2023	617	3.51
It is election day, and the station is serving as a ballot drop-off location. Eli and Dixon appear to make sure things are running smoothly. Montgomery apologizes to Eli for dropping out of the race. Ross announces that Warren will be awarded a Medal of Valor for saving a man while injured, but he does not want it. Herrera, Sullivan, and Ruiz have applied to be the permanent captain for Station 19. On a call, the three fight to stand out so they can make the best case. Meanwhile, Beckett has called in sick, and Hughes lies to Ruiz so that she can check on him. She is badgering him with questions because she is worried that Beckett will commit suicide. After the two share their losses while on the job, Beckett has a breakdown, and he decides to return to rehab. Meanwhile, the rest of the team responds to a car wash call and Herrera goes against Ruiz and after the team has an argument, Ross says she might have to rethink things. After Beckett leaves, Hughes has her own breakdown after he leaves. Dixon loses the election, and Eli accepts Montgomery's apology. Gibson meets with his biological sister, who has found his foster sister. When DeLuca learns that Bishop did not apply to be captain so she could put her marriage first, she decides to move back in with Maya.
95	18	"Glamorous Life"	Stacey K. Black	Zoanne Clack	May 18, 2023	618	3.72
The team attends the Firefighters Ball where Warren will receive his Medal of Valor. After some encouragement from Miranda, Warren accepts the award in honor of those who could not be saved. Dixon is there because his wife oversees the ball. Gibson notices a pregnant waitress named Nanette. Ross privately tells Herrera that she will be named captain. The news leaks out, and Hughes wants to celebrate, which upsets Ruiz. At first, Bailey says the situation in the back kitchen is under control but no one knows for sure. At the ball, Ruiz and Hughes argue about their relationship. Later, Gibson catches Ruiz kissing Kate Powell. When smoke comes out of a wall, Ross has Herrera take command to find the source. She extinguishes the fire in the basement but notices that the floor above is about to collapse. She tries to warn the guests, but people, including Ross, Dixon, and Nanette, fall into the hole. Bishop and DeLuca find Nanette and perform an emergency delivery of her baby. Sullivan finds and revives Ross, and they make up. Montgomery finds Dixon and tries performing CPR on Dixon, but he succumbs to his injuries and dies. The situation gets under control when, suddenly, Gibson collapses.

== Cast and characters ==
=== Main ===
- Jaina Lee Ortiz as Andrea "Andy" Herrera
- Jason George as Benjamin "Ben" Warren
- Boris Kodjoe as Robert Sullivan
- Grey Damon as Jack Gibson
- Barrett Doss as Victoria "Vic" Hughes
- Jay Hayden as Travis Montgomery
- Danielle Savre as Maya DeLuca-Bishop
- Stefania Spampinato as Dr. Carina DeLuca-Bishop
- Carlos Miranda as Theodore "Theo" Ruiz
- Josh Randall as Fire Captain Sean Beckett
- Merle Dandridge as Fire Chief Natasha Ross
- Pat Healy as Michael Dixon

=== Recurring ===
- Tricia O'Kelley as Kitty Dixon
- Kelly Thiebaud as Eva Vasquez
- Rob Heaps as Eli Stern
- Annie Sertich as Peggy Knox
- Nina Millin as Dayna Rutledge
- Anna Daines as Brooke Hill
- Antonio Jaramillo as Tomás Silva
- Chandra Wilson as Dr. Miranda Bailey
- Emerson Brooks as Robel Osman
- Kiele Sanchez as Kate Powell

=== Notable guests ===
- Niko Terho as Dr. Lucas Adams
- Rigo Sanchez as Rigo Vasquez
- Jaicy Elliot as Dr. Taryn Helm
- Ellen Pompeo as Dr. Meredith Grey
- Caterina Scorsone as Dr. Amelia Shepherd
- Kelly McCreary as Dr. Maggie Pierce
- Kim Raver as Dr. Teddy Altman
- Anthony Hill as Dr. Winston Ndugu
- Harry Shum Jr. as Dr. Benson "Blue" Kwan
- Aniela Gumbs as Zola Grey Shepherd
- Michael Grant Terry as Officer Jones
- Tracie Thoms as Dr. Diane Lewis
- Joel McKinnon Miller as Reggie
- Jayne Taini as Marsha Smith
- Thalia Tran as Maddy

== Production ==
=== Development ===
On January 11, 2022, ABC renewed the series for a sixth season. Shonda Rhimes and Betsy Beers returned as executive producers. Krista Vernoff returned as showrunner as part of a two-year deal with ABC. During the writing process for the season, an episode was written where a character used a racial slur multiple times, which led to a pause of the writers room. It was revealed that there had been similar racial incidents in the past. As a result, Zoanne Clack was named head writer and executive producer, replacing Kiley Donovan. Vernoff stepped down as showrunner at the end of the season.

=== Casting ===
The entire main cast from the fifth season returned for the sixth season except for Okieriete Onaodowan, who left partway through the previous season. Josh Randall and Merle Dandridge were upped to series regulars after recurring the previous season. Pat Healy was also upped to a series regular after recurring the past several seasons. Kelly Thiebaud reprised her role as Eva Vasquez from the third season.

== Release ==
When the 2022–23 United States network television schedule was announced, Station 19 would remain on Thursdays at 8:00 PM. The season premiered on October 6, 2022. The mid-season finale air on November 10, 2022 as part of a crossover event.

In the United Kingdom, episodes were released weekly starting October 26, 2022 on Disney+.

== Reception ==
=== Awards and nominations ===
Merle Dandridge received an honorable mention for TVLine's Performer of the Week for her performance in "We Build Then We Break". Head writer Zoanne Clack and writer Zaiver Sinnett won the Sentinel Award for Depiction of Systemic Racism for the same episode.

=== Ratings ===
The season was ABC's fifth most-watched scripted television series during the 2022–2023 television season in the 18-49 demographic. Throughout its broadcast, in same-day viewership, the season averaged a 0.47 rating (Note: In Nielsen ratings, a rating is a fraction of the total number of households with televisions compared to the number of television sets tuned into a specific program.) in the 18–49 demographic and 3.86 million viewers, down 22 and 14 percent, respectively, from the previous season. In Live+7 (Note: Live+7 data includes the number of viewers watching episodes within seven days of its original broadcast by means of DVR and streaming video on demand.) the season averaged a 0.7 rating in the 18–49 demographic and 5.2 million viewers, down 21 and 15 percent, respectively.

Viewership and ratings per episode of Station 19 season 6
No.	Title	Air date	Rating (18–49)	Viewers (millions)	DVR (18–49)	DVR viewers (millions)	Total (18–49)	Total viewers (millions)
1	"Twist and Shout"	October 6, 2022	0.5	4.19	0.3	1.62	0.8	5.82
2	"Everybody's Got Something to Hide Except Me and My Monkey"	October 13, 2022	0.5	3.70	0.2	1.49	0.7	5.19
3	"Dancing with Our Hands Tied"	October 20, 2022	0.4	3.90	0.2	1.40	0.6	5.30
4	"Demons"	October 27, 2022	0.5	3.87	0.2	1.35	0.8	5.22
5	"Pick Up the Pieces"	November 3, 2022	0.5	3.52	0.3	1.49	0.7	5.02
6	"Everybody Says Don't"	November 10, 2022	0.5	3.99	0.3	1.47	0.8	5.46
7	"We Build Then We Break"	February 23, 2023	0.5	3.97	—N/a	—N/a	—N/a	—N/a
8	"I Know A Place"	March 2, 2023	0.5	3.83	—N/a	—N/a	—N/a	—N/a
9	"Come As You Are"	March 9, 2023	0.5	3.97	—N/a	—N/a	—N/a	—N/a
10	"Even Better Than the Real Thing"	March 16, 2023	0.5	4.30	—N/a	—N/a	—N/a	—N/a
11	"Could I Leave You?"	March 23, 2023	0.5	3.88	—N/a	—N/a	—N/a	—N/a
12	"Never Gonna Give You Up"	March 30, 2023	0.5	3.76	—N/a	—N/a	—N/a	—N/a
13	"It's All Gonna Break"	April 6, 2023	0.4	3.70	—N/a	—N/a	—N/a	—N/a
14	"Get it All Out"	April 13, 2023	0.4	3.91	—N/a	—N/a	—N/a	—N/a
15	"What Are You Willing to Lose"	April 20, 2023	0.5	3.96	—N/a	—N/a	—N/a	—N/a
16	"Dirty Laundry"	May 4, 2023	0.5	3.79	—N/a	—N/a	—N/a	—N/a
17	"All These Things That I've Done"	May 11, 2023	0.4	3.51	—N/a	—N/a	—N/a	—N/a
18	"Glamorous Life"	May 18, 2023	0.5	3.72	—N/a	—N/a	—N/a	—N/a
