= Station 19 season 1 =

Station 19
- Season 1
- Promotional poster for the first season of Station 19
- Showrunners: Stacy McKee; Shonda Rhimes
- Starring: Jaina Lee Ortiz; Jason George; Grey Damon; Barrett Doss; Alberto Frezza; Jay Hayden; Okieriete Onaodowan; Danielle Savre; Miguel Sandoval
- No. of episodes: 10

Release
- Original network: ABC
- Original release: March 22 – May 17, 2018

Season chronology
- Next → Season 2

The first season of the American television action-drama Station 19, spin off of Grey's Anatomy, began airing in the United States on the American Broadcasting Company (ABC) on March 22, 2018, and concluded on May 17, 2018. The season was produced by ABC Studios, in association with Shondaland Production Company. The show was created by Stacy McKee who acted as showrunner for the first season. On May 11, 2018, ABC renewed the series for a second season.

Station 19 centers around the professional and personal lives of the firefighters of the fictional Station 19 of the Seattle Fire Department.

== Episodes ==
List of Station 19 season 1 episodes
No. overall	No. in season	Title	Directed by	Written by	Original release date	Prod. code	U.S. viewers (millions)
1	1	"Stuck"	Paris Barclay	Stacy McKee	March 22, 2018	101	5.43
2	2	"Invisible to Me"	Paris Barclay	Stacy McKee	March 22, 2018	102	5.43
When the team responds to an apartment fire, Captain Pruitt Herrera takes a hit, the future of the station's leadership is in jeopardy and firefighter Andy Herrera is forced to step up. Meanwhile, new recruit Ben Warren is trading in the scalpel for a fresh start as a firefighter, but it hasn't been easy and he has a hard time realizing that emergencies in the field are vastly different than those at Grey Sloan Memorial. In the absence of Captain Herrera, Andy and Jack try to navigate how to work together, when they have to take turns being captain. Andy is the first one, but things get complicated on her first day. Warren and Victoria start working together when the fire alarm is pulled at Ben's son (Tucker)'s school. In the meantime, Dean meets a civilian, JJ, when she asks him help to fix her apartment's alarm. A car accident on a rural road puts both the victims and the crew's lives at risk.
3	3	"Contain the Flame"	Mary Lou Belli	Wendy Calhoun	March 29, 2018	103	5.86
The team responds to the house fire at JJ's apartment with Dean risking his life to save Seth, who ends up dying at the hospital. An emotional JJ visits Dean at the station to help her process the loss. After a disagreement between Jack and Andy on the scene, Frankel calls them both out on their mistakes and later shows her respect for Jack because he, unlike Andy, had to work his way up without connections. Andy overhears this but leaves before Jack tells Frankel that if anything, Andy's father held her back. Maya and Travis pick sides for the Captain position. Ben finds it difficult not to have a follow-up with the people they rescue. Pruitt has a hard time staying at home and ends up returning to the station for administrative duties while Ryan wonders if Andy still sees him as his teenage self like her father does.
4	4	"Reignited"	Dennis Smith	Ilene Rosenzweig	April 5, 2018	104	5.09
The team deals with a fire at a brand-new bed-and-breakfast that keeps reigniting. Jack and Andy resume their sexual relationship after a week of bickering as co-captains, but they are not as secretive as they think they are. Maya keeps her distance from Andy after she asked Maya to back off and doesn't tell her when Ryan has her come over to the police station to identify her brother, who was caught shoplifting art supplies. Instead, she confides in Ryan that her brother lost his way because of their parents' devotion to her Olympic career. Dean seeks to ask out JJ and asks Travis and Pruitt for advice. Travis meets a handsome man through Edith. Meanwhile, Ben notices that the blue fire experience has left a mark on Victoria, who denies having developed a fear of fire as it would end her career.
5	5	"Shock to the System"	Milan Cheylov	Anupam Nigam	April 12, 2018	105	5.59
Maya and Andy go on a stakeout for a raid set up by Ryan and his team. While they fear for his safety, they hash out the recent tension between them and come clean about their problems. Seeing Ryan in his professional environment sparks Andy's interest. Pruitt turns up the heat on Jack following his discovery of his and Andy's sexual relationship. One by one, the other team members find out as well. Bailey visits the station and reprimands Pruitt for not following her instructions. JJ asks Dean out on a date. The team responds to a man caught in a dangerous, electrical situation while a pregnant woman, who turns out to be the man's wife, comes to the station looking for help with car seats.
6	6	"Stronger Together"	Nzingha Stewart	Angela L. Harvey	April 19, 2018	106	5.41
Jack and Andy participate in the captaincy drill test, The Incinerator. Much to their dismay, they learn that all the candidates are up for the department's sole available captain position at Station 19. Jack and Andy decide to work together in order to make sure one of them will end up getting the position. After Andy breaks protocol to save a life, Frankel's bias towards Andy is called into question by Fire Chief Ripley, whom Jack impresses with his test. With Travis as Acting Captain, the team responds to a woman whose leg is caught in a pothole. Inspired by the woman's courage to finally express her love to her long-time friend, Victoria comes clean to the team about her fear of fire. The team decides to keep it a secret from the lieutenants and to help Victoria any way they can. Pruitt seeks out Bailey for help when his health takes a turn for the worse.
7	7	"Let It Burn"	James Hanlon	Barbara Kaye Friend	April 26, 2018	107	5.17
Despite his increase in symptoms, Pruitt runs before Bailey can perform a checkup. He tries to hide his worsening symptoms but his colleagues find out and take him back to the hospital, where his treatment is increased. He also realizes he has to let people in and allows Andy to be kept in the loop. Edith plays Cupid for Travis and Grant, but Travis isn't too eager to start dating again. Maya and Travis help Victoria face her fears, while Maya runs into her homeless brother again and tries to offer him help. Ryan joins the team as they respond to a strip mall fire much to Jack's dismay. It leads Ryan to discover his heroic side, which causes him to tell Andy that he's done standing back. Bailey discovers that Ben has been hiding the dangerous calls from her.
8	8	"Every Second Counts"	Marisol Adler	Tia Napolitano	May 3, 2018	108	5.14
The time has come for peer reviews in the battle for the Captain position. Fire Chief Ripley interviews each team member and stresses the importance of a call earlier that day that went horribly wrong due to decisions made by both Jack and Andy. After piecing together what happened exactly from their testimonies, Ripley forces everyone to take a side based on the difficult dilemma the lieutenants were faced with. Victoria lashes out and tells him he has to pick either Jack or Andy rather than an outside candidate, but her behavior does more harm than good. Maya is surprised by Ripley's recommendation to run for Lieutenant herself. Travis surprisingly backs Andy given his bad experiences with incapable Captains while Dean also backs her despite his support for Jack. Pruitt, who's stuck at the hospital for a new round of chemo, confides in Ripley that he should choose neither Jack nor Andy.
9	9	"Hot Box"	Nicole Rubio	Phillip Iscove	May 10, 2018	109	4.45
Pruitt warns Andy not to get her hopes up for the Captain position. Tired Dean messes up at the scene of a house fire and traps part of the team, police officers, and a civilian in a garage that was specifically built to keep people out. As the rest of the team has trouble reaching the fire inside the highly protected house, the temperature in the garage keeps rising, threatening the lives of everyone inside. With a similar call that ended with the deaths of his colleagues in his mind, Pruitt arrives at the scene to urge Andy to fight herself a way out. The trapped people work together and cause an explosion to burst open the garage doors. While celebrating their victory, Victoria covers for Dean, Jack finds out about Andy's involvement with Ryan, and Pruitt comes clean to Andy about his recommendation for the Captain position, explaining he wanted to rally the team against an outsider.
10	10	"Not Your Hero"	Paris Barclay	Stacy McKee	May 17, 2018	110	5.10
The team celebrates Ben surviving 50 fires. Ripley's interviews with the remaining candidates are cut short when he has to help out at a skyscraper fire. Jack tells Andy he's transferring to another station if he doesn't make Captain. After remaining on standby for hours, the team is finally called to the skyscraper fire. Maya and Victoria work with Molly, an evacuation captain, to control a crowd stuck on a floor above the fire. Maya hides her hearing problems following the barotrauma she suffered in the garage. Dean and Jack try to keep the fire away from combustibles on the building's maintenance floor. After the fire jumps floors and chaos ensues, Ben fights to save a lethally injured Travis, and in the process finds a badly injured Molly in the staircase. Travis tells Ben to leave him and save Molly instead. Andy saves Charlotte and impresses Ripley. However, she openly defies his orders by sending an elevator to the floor Jack and Dean are stuck on. Jack stays behind to close fire doors to save the scattered crew. As Andy begs him to save himself, they lose contact and a blast shakes the building, putting everyone's life in jeopardy. Meanwhile, back at the station, Ryan and Bailey work to resuscitate an unconscious Pruitt.

== Cast and characters ==
=== Main ===
- Jaina Lee Ortiz as Andrea "Andy" Herrera
- Jason George as Benjamin “Ben” Warren
- Grey Damon as Jack Gibson
- Barrett Doss as Victoria "Vic" Hughes
- Alberto Frezza as Ryan Tanner
- Jay Hayden as Travis Montgomery
- Okieriete Onaodowan as Dean Miller
- Danielle Savre as Maya Bishop
- Miguel Sandoval as Pruitt Herrera

=== Recurring ===
- Chandra Wilson as Dr. Miranda Bailey
- Marla Gibbs as Edith
- Brenda Song as JJ
- Sterling Sulieman as Grant
- Brett Tucker as Fire Chief Lucas Ripley

=== Notable guests ===
- Ellen Pompeo as Dr. Meredith Grey
- BJ Tanner as William George “Tuck” Jones
- Jee Young Han as Charlotte Dearborn
- Jake Borelli as Dr. Levi Schmitt

== Production ==
=== Development ===
On May 16, 2017, ABC chief Channing Dungey announced at ABC's upfront presentation that the network had given a straight-to-series order for a second Grey's Anatomy spin-off. Stacy McKee, a long-term Grey's writer and executive producer, would serve as showrunner and executive producer, with Shonda Rhimes and Betsy Beers also serving as executive producers. The series, which would be set in a Seattle firehouse, would follow the lives of a group of firefighters. The order consisted of 10 episodes. When announcing the series, Dungey said, "No one can interweave the jeopardy firefighters face in the line of duty with the drama in their personal lives quite like Shonda, and Grey's signature Seattle setting is the perfect backdrop for this exciting spinoff." Patrick Moran, president at ABC Studios, added that "We talked [with Shonda] about the elements of Grey's Anatomy that seem to resonate with the audience—emotional storytelling, deep human connection, a high-stakes environment and strong and empowered women—and those elements will carry over to the spinoff." In July 2017, Paris Barclay signed on to the series as producing director and executive producer. In January 2018, it was announced that Ellen Pompeo had renewed her contract to portray Meredith Grey through season 16 of Grey's, in addition to becoming a producer on the show and a co-executive producer on the spin-off. Later that month, ABC announced that the series would be titled Station 19.

An episode of Grey's Anatomy, originally planned to air in fall 2017 but instead aired in March 2018, served as a backdoor pilot for the series. The backdoor pilot episode featured the introduction of the lead character of the spin-off, Andy Herrera, "as a story within the episode" and "showcase a really lovely story for Ben, where we get to just juxtapose his two worlds and see his reaction as he transitions from one world to the next".

=== Casting ===
On July 26, 2017, Jaina Lee Ortiz was cast as the female lead, Andrea "Andy" Herrera. In September 2017, it was announced that Jason George, who has played Dr. Ben Warren since season 6 of Grey's Anatomy, would be leaving the series to join the spin-off as a series regular. On October 6, 2017, Grey Damon was cast as Lieutenant Jack Gibson, Jay Hayden as Travis Montgomery, Okieriete Onaodowan as Dean Miller, Danielle Savre as Maya Bishop, and Barrett Doss as Victoria "Vic" Hughes. They were shortly followed by Miguel Sandoval as Captain Pruitt Herrera, and Alberto Frezza as police officer, Ryan Tanner.

In March 2018, it was reported that Brett Tucker would play a character named Ripley. Also, Marla Gibbs was cast, and her character would have a multi-episode arc. It was also reported that Brenda Song would have appear in multiple episodes. Chandra Wilson would also appear as her Grey's Anatomy character, Dr. Miranda Bailey.

== Release ==
The first season began airing on March 22, 2018 with special two-hour premiere at 9:00 PM ET on ABC, following parent series Grey's Anatomy, with the remaining episodes airing in the Thursdays at 9:00 PM timeslot.

== Reception ==
=== Ratings ===
The season was ABC's eleventh most-watched scripted television series during the 2017–2018 television season in the 18-49 demographic. Throughout its broadcast, in same-day viewership, the season averaged a 1.05 rating (Note: In Nielsen ratings, a rating is a fraction of the total number of households with televisions compared to the number of television sets tuned into a specific program.) in the 18–49 demographic and 5.27 million viewers. In Live+7 (Note: Live+7 data includes the number of viewers watching episodes within seven days of its original broadcast by means of DVR and streaming video on demand.) the season averaged a 1.8 rating in the 18–49 demographic and 7.87 million viewers.

Viewership and ratings per episode of Station 19 season 1
No.	Title	Air date	Rating/share (18–49)	Viewers (millions)	DVR (18–49)	DVR viewers (millions)	Total (18–49)	Total viewers (millions)
1–2	"Stuck" "Invisible To Me"	March 22, 2018	1.1/5	5.43	0.9	3.11	2.0	8.54
3	"Contain the Flame"	March 29, 2018	1.2/5	5.86	0.8	2.70	2.0	8.56
4	"Reignited"	April 5, 2018	1.0/4	5.09	0.8	2.63	1.8	7.72
5	"Shock to the System"	April 12, 2018	1.0/4	5.59	0.8	2.40	1.8	7.99
6	"Stronger Together"	April 19, 2018	1.1/4	5.41	0.7	2.42	1.8	7.84
7	"Let It Burn"	April 26, 2018	0.9/3	5.17	0.7	2.30	1.6	7.47
8	"Every Second Counts"	May 3, 2018	1.0/4	5.14	0.7	2.25	1.7	7.40
9	"Hot Box"	May 10, 2018	0.9/4	4.45	0.7	2.29	1.6	6.75
10	"Not Your Hero"	May 17, 2018	1.0/4	5.10	0.7	2.26	1.7	7.35
