= Station 19 season 2 =

Station 19
- Season 2
- Promotional poster for the second season of Station 19
- Showrunners: Stacy McKee; Shonda Rhimes
- Starring: Jaina Lee Ortiz; Jason George; Boris Kodjoe; Grey Damon; Barrett Doss; Alberto Frezza; Jay Hayden; Okieriete Onaodowan; Danielle Savre; Miguel Sandoval
- No. of episodes: 17

Release
- Original network: ABC
- Original release: October 4, 2018 – May 16, 2019

Season chronology
- ← Previous; Season 1 Next → Season 3

The second season of the American television action-drama Station 19, spin off of Grey's Anatomy, began airing in the United States on the American Broadcasting Company (ABC) on October 4, 2018, and concluded on May 16, 2019. The season was produced by ABC Studios, in association with Shondaland Production Company.

This is the first season to feature Boris Kodjoe as a series regular. This is the last season under showrunner Stacy McKee and the last season to feature Alberto Frezza as a series regular. On May 10, 2019, the series was renewed for a third season.

Station 19 centers around the professional and personal lives of the firefighters of the fictional Station 19 of the Seattle Fire Department. Several plot points connect to parent series Grey's Anatomy through fictional crossover events.

== Episodes ==
List of Station 19 season 2 episodes
No. overall	No. in season	Title	Directed by	Written by	Original release date	Prod. code	U.S. viewers (millions)
11	1	"No Recovery"	Paris Barclay	Stacy McKee	October 4, 2018	201	5.17
Following the blast, Andy disobeys Ripley's orders and goes back to look for Jack accompanied by Maya. Vic finds a dying Travis in the stairwell and tries to drag him down to safety. After saving a victim, Dean also goes back inside against Ripley's orders to save Jack, but he ends up assisting Vic in getting Travis out. Ben manages to save Molly while Andy and Maya save Jack. Travis and Molly are taken to Grey Sloan Memorial. While waiting, Ben bonds with Molly's mother and finds that Vic blames him for leaving Travis to die. However, she forgives him when she sees how heartbroken he is to find out about Molly's passing on the operating table. Meanwhile, Travis undergoes high risk surgery and later pulls through. Pruitt pulls through and Andy is told he is close to remission, but Ryan keeping his deterioration a secret from her leads to them deciding to break their pattern of looking for comfort with one another. The station's crew is introduced to their new, tough Captain: Robert Sullivan. Meanwhile, flashbacks detail the origins of the close friendships between Maya and Andy, Dean and Jack, and Vic and Travis.
12	2	"Under the Surface"	Milan Cheylov	Tia Napolitano	October 11, 2018	202	6.54
Dean asks out Dr. Maggie Pierce. Andy decides to impress the new Captain by letting him bask in her awesome, but finds that her father is holding her back. With Pruitt approaching remission, Andy decides to move out and accepts Maya's offer to come live with her. The team sets out to rescue a boy who ran away from Grey Sloan and fell into the drainage system pipes while being pursued by Ryan. Andy attempts a risky move to save the boy but sidelines a prepared Maya in doing so, resulting in a fight between the two, as well as a reprimand for Andy by Sullivan. After having joined the firefighters at the rescue scene with Dr. Andrew DeLuca, Maggie turns Dean down, but he lets her know that his offer still stands, should she ever be without a boyfriend. Travis visits the station and is drawn into the action of the rescue. Ben is put on desk duty for not sticking to protocol and Pruitt is offended when Sullivan suggests he retire. Note : This episode concludes a crossover event that begins on Grey's Anatomy season 15 episode 4.
13	3	"Home to Hold Onto"	Tessa Blake	Anupam Nigam	October 18, 2018	203	4.16
The firehouse is on high alert as the new Captain gives out orders. Maya and Andy are living as friends together. At a call, an old woman is stuck and Andy goes in to rescue her. Vic is still upset with Travis for telling Ben to leave him to die in the skyscraper fire, putting the two at odds. Meanwhile, a police ride along turns into a brief partnership as Ryan takes an unlikely member of the team with him.
14	4	"Lost and Found"	Marcus Stokes	Jim Campolongo	October 25, 2018	204	5.02
Sullivan assigns each member of the crew a specialty skill to learn. Sullivan puts Andy on recruitment duty. At a fire in an unoccupied structure, Sullivan lets Maya take command. She assigns teams to enter and inspect the structure, and they find people living inside. Maya becomes fixated on opening a fire hydrant, so Sullivan decides to resume command to rescue the people. Maya becomes angry because she could not impress Sullivan. Meanwhile, Ryan raids an illegal card game and encounters his father, who is there to win money to repay debts. Vic and Travis go to group therapy and find Ripley there as well.
15	5	"Do a Little Harm..."	Sylvain White	Angela L. Harvey	November 1, 2018	205	4.89
Captain Sullivan brings together the police and fire departments for a training seminar. When Bishop does not appear to take it seriously, Sullivan yells at her. Ripley sends Sullivan home. Flashbacks show the history of Sullivan and Ripley’s relationship. Montgomery tries to add more excitement into his relationship with Grant. Bishop is applying to be a lieutenant. Miller’s parents want him to join the family business. Bailey’s worrying about Warren’s job is affecting her health, and he decides to move out temporarily. Gibson throws a birthday party for Miller. Hughes flirts with Ripley at the party, and they end up in bed together.
16	6	"Last Day on Earth"	Steve Robin	Phillip Iscove	November 8, 2018	206	5.10
Ryan’s father, Greg, appears at the station injured, and Andy and Bishop treat him. Ryan arrives and finds out that Greg is in legal trouble. When Greg collapses, he is sent to a hospital. Sullivan asks Pruitt for advice on how to connect with his team. Pruitt says to get the person who is the glue of the team on his side, so Sullivan invites Andy to have a conversation with him. Hughes asks Gibson for relationship advice after sleeping with Ripley. After separating from his wife, Warren is sleeping at the station, so he is invited to live with Miller and Gibson.
17	7	"Weather the Storm"	Oliver Bokelberg	Stacy McKee	November 15, 2018	207	5.91
With a windstorm raging over Seattle, the team's Friendsgiving at Dean's is cut short and moved over to the station. Andy and Sullivan head out in the aid car to aid a hit-and-run victim. Upon finding out the accident happened at the exact same spot where his wife died, Sullivan has trouble keeping himself together, while a faulty connection to dispatch leaves them unsure which hospital is still accessible. The rest of the team heads out to free a man who got trapped under a collapsed car port. While at the scene, the situation worsens when destroyed electrical wiring causes a house fire. Back at the station, Jack is unable to hide his PTSD from Pruitt after a confrontation. Meanwhile, Ryan discovers that the FBI has issued an arrest warrant for his father, leaving him unsure whether to act on it or not. Ripley and Vic try to hide their budding relationship while he spends the day at the station. Over dinner, he announces that Maya will soon be promoted to Lieutenant, although the promotion requires her to move to Station 23. Maya calls Andy to tell her, but Andy is unreachable as the aid car was blown off the road into a ravine.
18	8	"Crash and Burn"	Paris Barclay	Tia Napolitano	March 7, 2019	208	5.24
Andy has to take care of Sullivan and their patient, Shannon in the crashed aid car. Since Sullivan can't move his legs, Andy has to keep Shannon alive and climb up the hill to place a flare all by herself. Back at the station, Pruitt demands the firefighters stage an intervention for Jack, who starts lashing out. Travis breaks things off with Grant. As soon as they get word that the aid car never arrived at the hospital, the team stages a successful search and rescue mission. Ryan decides to let his father go. Four months later, Andy is awarded a Medal of Valor even though she doesn't think she deserves it. Vic and Ripley's relationship continues to grow, while Jack has started therapy.
19	9	"I Fought the Law"	Sydney Freeland	Barbara Kaye Friend	March 14, 2019	209	5.02
Andy, Maya and Dean find an injured woman who appears to have amnesia, but later they figure out she was a fugitive who wanted to see her son. Sullivan, Ben and Jack nearly have a close call while they're treating a patient. Ryan may not have seen the last of his father.
20	10	"Crazy Train"	Daryn Okada	Anupam Nigam	March 21, 2019	210	5.55
Jack and Maya are called to treat minor injuries in a stalled subway train, but they discover a contagious disease may be spreading amongst the passengers and initiate a quarantine, much to some passengers' dismay. As they work together to avert a crisis amidst several medical crises, Jack's PTSD is looming. Andy and Vic give a tour to Kathleen, a cadet from the Fire Academy who's on the brink of dropping out, and give her tips to stand her ground as a woman in the tough training program. Meanwhile, the men discover a more cheerful side to Sullivan when he helps out to repaint Travis' apartment. Jack and Maya celebrate their successful day together in the shower. Pruitt forces Ryan to vet potential buyers for his house.
21	11	"Baby Boom"	Marcus Stokes	Molly Green & James Leffler	March 28, 2019	211	5.44
The station is shaken up when a young girl crashes an RV into the building. While the crew works to stabilize the structure, Ben works to stabilize the girl's mother who is having seizures, earning him a blessing to apply for Medic One from Sullivan. Andy takes care of the girl, whose insulin is possibly disturbed by the crash. Later, the girl collapses. Also, Ripley works with Travis and learns that he knows about his involvement with Vic, prompting a fight between the new couple. Later, a baby is left at reception, forcing the firefighters to take turns in babysitting duty, which has a surprising effect on the initially averse Maya. Meanwhile, Jack and Dean have dinner with Dean's family, who disapprove of Dean's career choice. Dean's sister Yemi drops the bomb that she too, wants to move out. In order to convince their parents to give her the same support he had, Dean agrees to go on dates with suitable women of his mother's choosing. Pruitt gets personal with his real estate agent.
22	12	"When It Rains, It Pours!"	Ellen Pressman	Trey Callaway	April 4, 2019	212	5.26
Dean goes on a series of bad dates with women who disapprove of firefighting. Andy walks in on Pruitt and Reggie and struggles to accept him moving on, a sentiment Sullivan is familiar with. On her way home, a sick Vic witnesses a car crash involving a woman in labor. She works to keep the couple safe in the pouring rain and prepares for the impending delivery. Ripley finds himself in need of talking and confides in his old friend Sullivan. Jack confides in Maya that Dean's family troubles have him wondering about his own parents. While Maya is eager to help him out, he doesn't want to act on it yet, causing friction between them. After the rescue, Vic confronts her fight with Ripley and they agree to work things out. Ryan ends his involvement with Andy in favor a second date with fellow cop, Jenna.
23	13	"The Dark Night"	Stacey K. Black	Phillip Iscove	April 11, 2019	213	5.38
There is a blackout in Seattle that creates dangerous situations throughout the city. The crew is called to an apartment building to help locate a missing asthmatic girl. Andy convinces Sullivan to let cadet Kathleen come on a ride-along to re-kindle her love for firefighting after her best friend dropped out of the Academy. They eventually locate the missing girl trapped in an industrial washer, but a gas leak prevents them from using the usual tools. Meanwhile, Ben, Travis, and Vic fight to keep a terminal lung cancer patient alive without electricity and even though the man wishes to die, his daughter has trouble coming to terms with signing a DNR. Maya suggests Dean use her as a fake girlfriend to get his mother off his back, which makes Jack see how great she is. Pruitt's recent Hawaii trip and job change inspires Ripley to go after what he wants. Andy and Sullivan build their friendship, while Andy also befriends Jenna.
24	14	"Friendly Fire"	DeMane Davis	Jim Campolongo	April 18, 2019	214	4.96
Ripley and Vic are considering the crazy option to marry to save their relationship. Station 19 gets called to handle a structure fire at a coffee processing plant. The team rescues Station 42's firefighters, but 42's Captain is stuck in the building, so Ripley risks his life to save him. Andy is surprised when she finds out about Maya and Jack's secret relationship. Pruitt takes on a new job.
25	15	"Always Ready"	Nicole Rubio	Tia Napolitano	May 2, 2019	215	6.39
Ripley has absconded from Grey Sloan, wanting to find Vic (who is ignoring his calls, thinking he stood her up at the diner). Maggie Pierce has found that Ripley's condition is far more grave than it appears. Andy, Sullivan, and Ben search for Vic to explain the situation to her, but she has thrown herself into a call that needs her to climb a cell tower hosting an altered woman in crisis (and is still ignoring her phone). The team is able to fill Vic in and rush her to the hospital, where Ripley's sister--who is unaware of Vic's proposal--doesn't want Pierce to update anyone but her about Ripley's condition. Andy finds Vic a yelling room, and Pierce explains to Ripley's sister that he has been asking for Vic to accept her proposal, leading his sister to allowing Vic into the room. Ripley shortly dies in Vic's arms, with the Seattle firefighters shocked. Note : This episode concludes a crossover event that begins on Grey's Anatomy season 15 episode 23.
26	16	"For Whom the Bell Tolls"	Tessa Blake	Barbara Kaye Friend	May 9, 2019	216	5.05
Station 19 is called to organize their equipment to supply and assist with a big wildfire in Los Angeles; Ryan says to Andy he will move to San Diego for a program of paramedical formation, with his new girlfriend Jenna. In the meantime Vic can't accept Ripley's death and she doesn't want to go to the funeral, so she argues with Travis who tries to help her. Every firefighter in Station 19 is shocked by this loss and Sullivan has to write the funeral eulogy. During the day Andy and Ben respond to a man impaled by a chandelier and save his life. At the end Vic goes to the ceremony, which is very sad but also beautiful, then she goes to her and Ripley's favorite place, where she starts to accept her loss. Maya and Andy make up. In the evening a drunk Travis punches another firefighter who said derogatory things about Vic.
27	17	"Into the Wildfire"	Paris Barclay	Stacy McKee	May 16, 2019	217	4.82
Maya and Jack go public with their relationship. Ryan prepares to move to San Diego for the Tactical Paramedic Program. Station 19 is called to aid in battling a wildfire in Los Angeles and is assigned to protect a remote neighborhood. While there, they team up with wildfire-experienced residents Terry and Maria. Terry gets his hand stuck in a brush cutter causing Ben to amputate his hand. Dean fights to make Vic see light in the darkness. Sudden direction changes of the wind cut the neighborhood off from the rest of the firefighters as the wildfire closes in, forcing the group to retreat. A near-death experience brings Andy and Sullivan even closer together. The team makes it out alive just in time thanks to instructions by a local deaf firefighter named Dylan, who shares a kiss with Travis. Back in Seattle, Maya meets Dean's girlfriend Nikki, who turns out to be one of her exes. Travis is arrested when the firefighter he assaulted presses charges. Andy and Sullivan give in to the attraction between them, but Sullivan stops when he experiences numbness in his leg. Ben's impromptu amputation causes the Medic One proctor to take a closer look at his surgical career, which reveals several more cowboy moves, threatening Ben's acceptance into the program.

== Cast and characters ==
=== Main ===
- Jaina Lee Ortiz as Andrea "Andy" Herrera
- Jason George as Benjamin “Ben” Warren
- Boris Kodjoe as Robert Sullivan^{a}
- Grey Damon as Jack Gibson
- Barrett Doss as Victoria "Vic" Hughes
- Alberto Frezza as Ryan Tanner
- Jay Hayden as Travis Montgomery
- Okieriete Onaodowan as Dean Miller
- Danielle Savre as Maya Bishop
- Miguel Sandoval as Pruitt Herrera

=== Recurring ===
- Brett Tucker as Fire Chief Lucas Ripley
- Sterling Sulieman as Grant
- Dermot Mulroney as Greg Tanner
- Birgundi Baker as Yemi Miller

=== Notable guests ===
- Chandra Wilson as Dr. Miranda Bailey
- Giacomo Gianniotti as Dr. Andrew DeLuca
- Kelly McCreary as Dr. Maggie Pierce
- JoBeth Williams as Reggie
- Barbara Eve Harris as Ifeya Miller
- Jeffrey D. Sams as Bill Miller
- Jake Borelli as Dr. Levi Schmitt
- Patrick Duffy as Terry
- Nyle DiMarco as Dylan

a Kodjoe is promoted to series regular in the episode "Weather the Storm" (2.7) after previously recurring for 6 episodes, starting with the season premiere.

== Production ==
=== Development ===
On May 11, 2018, ABC renewed the series for a second season with Stacy McKee returning as showrunner. Shonda Rhimes and Betsy Beers remained executive producers, and Paris Barclay remained executive producer and producing director. On October 19, 2018, it was announced that ABC had ordered a full season for the second season, increasing the episode count from 13 to 17, although it was also reported to have received a 22 episode order. Stacy McKee stepped down as showrunner at the end of the season after her overall deal with ABC Studios expired.

=== Casting ===
The entire main cast from the first season returned for the second season. Brett Tucker and Sterling Sulieman continued their recurring roles as Fire Chief Ripley and Grant, Travis' love interest, from the first season. In July 2018, Boris Kodjoe was cast in a recurring role as a firefighter with a mysterious past who is returning to the Seattle Fire Department. He was later promoted to a series regular. In September 2018, Dermot Mulroney was cast for a multi-episode arc as Ryan Tanner's father. In January 2019, JoBeth Williams was cast as someone who would shake things up for the characters. In March 2019, it was reported that Birgundi Baker would play a recurring role as Dean Miller's sister, Yemi. In addition, Kelly McCreary and Jake Borelli made guest star appearances as their Grey's Anatomy characters in a crossover event.

== Release ==
When the 2018-19 United States network television schedule was announced, Station 19 would remain at Thursdays at 9:00 PM following parent show, Grey's Anatomy. The second season premiered on October 4, 2018.

== Reception ==
=== Ratings ===
The season was ABC's seventh most-watched scripted television series during the 2018–2019 television season in the 18-49 demographic. Throughout its broadcast, in same-day viewership, the season averaged a 0.95 rating (Note: In Nielsen ratings, a rating is a fraction of the total number of households with televisions compared to the number of television sets tuned into a specific program.) in the 18–49 demographic and 5.29 million viewers, down 9 and up 0.4 percent, respectively, from the previous season. In Live+7 (Note: Live+7 data includes the number of viewers watching episodes within seven days of its original broadcast by means of DVR and streaming video on demand.) the season averaged a 1.6 rating in the 18–49 demographic and 7.66 million viewers, down 11 and 2 percent from the first season.

Viewership and ratings per episode of Station 19 season 2
No.	Title	Air date	Rating/share (18–49)	Viewers (millions)	DVR (18–49)	DVR viewers (millions)	Total (18–49)	Total viewers (millions)
1	"No Recovery"	October 4, 2018	1.1/5	5.17	0.6	2.36	1.7	7.53
2	"Under the Surface"	October 11, 2018	1.3/5	6.54	0.9	2.75	2.2	9.29
3	"Home to Hold Onto"	October 18, 2018	0.8/3	4.16	0.7	2.25	1.5	6.40
4	"Lost and Found"	October 25, 2018	0.9/4	5.02	0.6	2.16	1.5	7.19
5	"Do a Little Harm..."	November 1, 2018	0.9/4	4.89	0.7	2.32	1.6	7.21
6	"Last Day on Earth"	November 8, 2018	1.0/5	5.10	0.7	2.38	1.7	7.48
7	"Weather the Storm"	November 15, 2018	1.2/5	5.91	0.7	2.40	1.9	8.31
8	"Crash and Burn"	March 7, 2019	0.9/4	5.24	0.7	2.54	1.6	7.78
9	"I Fought the Law"	March 14, 2019	0.8/4	5.02	0.6	2.34	1.4	7.30
10	"Crazy Train"	March 21, 2019	0.9/4	5.55	0.6	2.27	1.5	7.82
11	"Baby Boom"	March 28, 2019	1.0/5	5.44	0.6	2.29	1.6	7.74
12	"When It Rains, It Pours!"	April 4, 2019	0.9/4	5.26	0.6	2.38	1.5	7.64
13	"The Dark Night"	April 11, 2019	0.9/5	5.38	0.6	2.15	1.5	7.53
14	"Friendly Fire"	April 18, 2019	0.8/4	4.96	0.6	2.24	1.4	7.21
15	"Always Ready"	May 2, 2019	1.2/6	6.39	0.9	2.70	2.1	9.10
16	"For Whom The Bell Tolls"	May 9, 2019	0.9/4	5.05	0.7	2.44	1.6	7.50
17	"Into the Wildfire"	May 16, 2019	0.8/4	4.82	0.7	2.42	1.5	7.25
