= Station 19 season 4 =

Station 19
- Season 4
- Promotional poster for the fourth season of Station 19
- Showrunner: Krista Vernoff
- Starring: Jaina Lee Ortiz; Jason George; Boris Kodjoe; Grey Damon; Barrett Doss; Jay Hayden; Okieriete Onaodowan; Danielle Savre; Stefania Spampinato
- No. of episodes: 16

Release
- Original network: ABC
- Original release: November 12, 2020 – June 3, 2021

Season chronology
- ← Previous; Season 3 Next → Season 5

The fourth season of the American television action-drama Station 19, spin off of Grey's Anatomy, began airing in the United States on the American Broadcasting Company (ABC) on November 12, 2020, and concluded on June 3, 2021. The season was produced by ABC Signature, in association with Shondaland Production Company and Trip the Light Productions.

This is the first season without Miguel Sandoval as a series regular. In addition, this is the first season with Stefania Spampinato as a series regular after recurring the previous season. On May 10, 2021, ABC renewed the series for a fifth season.

Station 19 centers around the professional and personal lives of the firefighters of the fictional Station 19 of the Seattle Fire Department. Several plot points connect to parent series Grey's Anatomy through fictional crossover events.

== Episodes ==
List of Station 19 season 4 episodes
No. overall	No. in season	Title	Directed by	Written by	Original release date	Prod. code	U.S. viewers (millions)
44	1	"Nothing Seems the Same"	Paris Barclay	Kiley Donovan	November 12, 2020	401	6.59
While the Station 19 team deals with the effects of COVID-19, the aid car deals with treating child victims involved in a car accident as they return from a party. When the car catches fire, things get complicated and quickly turn into a small forest fire. Andy continues to process the news that her mother is still alive while grieving the death of her father. Sullivan struggles with being fired from the Seattle Fire Department and settling into his new job. Note : This episode begins a crossover event that continues on Grey's Anatomy season 17 episode 1 and concludes on Grey's Anatomy season 17 episode 2.
45	2	"Wild World"	Bethany Rooney	Emmylou Diaz	November 19, 2020	402	5.66
As Andy takes time to reconnect with her family, Sullivan takes steps to get sober. Travis almost bites a woman's head off while on a call after a tiger attacks her; however, the tiger later appears inside the firehouse. Carina vents about losing a patient while she and Maya do their best to follow social distancing rules, but in the end, Carina comes to see Maya at the firehouse.
46	3	"We Are Family"	Paris Barclay	Zaiver Sinnett	December 3, 2020	403	5.58
Richard comes by the station to support Robert before his hearing in front of the fire commission, which will determine his future as a firefighter. During his testimony, Ben points to the country's opioid crisis as the main reason behind Sullivan's addiction and its consequences, which leads to the commission shutting down the PRT, deeming it too big a liability. Having been cleared of all charges and rehired at Seattle PD, Michael Dixon's testimony blames Sullivan for manipulating the firefighters, including his son. x Maya struggles to accept her nice life with Carina; she and Andy rekindle their friendship after realizing they have been completely out of touch and miss each other. After responding to a call at a group of drag queens' apartment building, Travis realizes he misses having gay friends and reconnects with Emmett. Emmett, Richard, and others speak their praises and concerns about Sullivan, and Sullivan worries he might lose his job. However, the crew from 19 return from the fire and interrupt the hearing to offer their support for Sullivan.
47	4	"Don't Look Back in Anger"	Bethany Rooney	Brian Anthony	December 10, 2020	404	5.58
Robert struggles to accept his position as a probie within the team while keeping his distance from Andy. The team tries to defuse a tense situation between a high and drunk Christian couple who refuse to follow COVID-19 protocols and are resistant to accepting help. To matters even more difficult, the heavily pregnant wife injures Travis and goes into labor at the scene. The experience causes Travis to make a painful reflection on catholic views regarding homosexuality, which leads him to confront his father about his hiding his sexual orientation. Dean feuds with Robert over the fact that his actions have complicated the careers of all fellow Black firefighters. Ben pleads with Dean to take into account Sullivan's burden, while Vic's support of his point of view causes Dean to rekindle their friendship. When Marsha is admitted to Grey Sloan with COVID-19, Jack temporarily moves into the apartment to support Marcus and Inara, who fears her current living arrangement is coming to an end. Meanwhile, Maya's struggles to share her living space with Carina make her fear she has turned herself into a copy of her dominant and controlling father.
48	5	"Out of Control"	Michael Medico	Tyrone Finch	December 17, 2020	405	5.63
After a successful call, Ben goes home to tell his family that Bailey's mother has passed away from COVID-19. Rosalind helps him not take Tuck's angry outburst personally, and he proceeds to make spaghetti for the family to bring them all together. Sullivan meets with Richard, his sponsor, who informs him that a separation from his spouse is not strictly necessary if being around her does not induce craving. Vic rejects Theo as she does not want to date during a pandemic, while Jack and Inara give in to their feelings for one another. Dean receives a gift from his parents, who want to reconcile. The crew later gathers at Maya's to celebrate. They are alerted by screaming out in the street and find a Black woman claiming that her daughter and a friend of hers have been kidnapped, having tracked her daughter's phone to a house nearby. The alleged kidnapper calls the cops on them for trespassing. Tension mounts as the cops refuse to believe the mother's claims. When a fire breaks out in the house's basement, Robert and Dean run in and discover the kidnapped girls locked up in the basement. They rescue the girls while the kidnapper maintains that they broke into his house and set fire to it. As one police officer clearly sides with him, an altercation ensues between the cops and the firefighters, which leads to the arrest of the mother, Dean, and Sullivan. Note : This episode begins a crossover event that concludes on Grey's Anatomy season 17 episode 6.
49	6	"Train in Vain"	Allison Liddi-Brown	Teleplay by : Meghann Plunkett; Story by : Rob Giles & Meghann Plunkett	March 11, 2021	406	5.40
As Station 19 tries to regroup and recover from the experiences of the previous day, the team tries to pull themselves together for their annual inspection. They show their support for Miller, who is struggling the most and wants to do something to ensure this never happens to any other black firefighter again. Meanwhile, Carina and her brother Andrew are in pursuit of Opal (a woman suspected to be linked with the trafficking, having already trafficked another young girl). Despite her concerns for her brother's safety, Andrew is determined not to let her escape again. Bishop, Warren, Gibson, and the police help successfully catch and arrest her, but Andrew is stabbed in the pursuit. He is immediately transferred to Grey-Sloan Memorial Hospital, where all his friends fight desperately to save his life. Note : This episode begins a crossover event that concludes on Grey's Anatomy season 17 episode 7.
50	7	"Learning to Fly"	Michael Medico	Sam Forman	March 18, 2021	407	5.10
Maya spends her time at home with a mourning Carina and tries to help her find ways to deal with her grief. Andy is allowed to step up as acting captain in her absence, causing friction with Sullivan. The crew responds to a call about a cult leader about to jump off a building to prove he has reached ultimate freedom. Upon trying to talk him off the edge, Jack is confronted with his fears and opens up his heart to love. Back home, he makes the leap and kisses Inara, much to Marcus and Marsha's delight. Having been confronted by a police officer who was involved in the incident leading up to his arrest, Dean abandons his plan to promote to Lieutenant in order to enforce change from the inside. Vic allows herself to grow closer to Theo Ruiz, who comforts her after the incident with the police. Travis' father visits him at the station and claims his photos were stolen from his hacked Facebook, an excuse Travis doesn't buy into. Ben performs hand surgery at the station on an HIV-positive man who refuses to go to the hospital and teaches Ben a valuable lesson about living through grief.
51	8	"Make No Mistake, He's Mine"	Allison Liddi-Brown	Shalisha Francis-Feusner	March 25, 2021	408	5.26
Vic and Ruiz continue to see each other privately, so when Ruiz finds out that he's picking up a sub shift at 19, Vic wants to pretend they aren't together. Marsha is slated to come home from Grey Sloan finally, so Jack, Inara, and Marcus make plans to be there to pick her up. Carina's Italian friend (and long-ago ex) Gabriella shows up, unnerving Maya. Ruiz shows up for his sub shift at 19, causing Travis to storm off, with Vic in pursuit. Travis reveals that Ruiz is the captain who got his husband killed. Three guys rush into the station, one of them lucid but with an arrow through his head. In the course of treating him, Herrera is frustrated by Sullivan's constant second-guessing. En route to Grey Sloan, the aid car drops Travis off with a car on the side of the road with an unresponsive driver, likely due to an overdose. Travis calls for backup, and Ruiz runs from the station. Upon arrival, Ruiz is standing next to the car when the driver wakes up and lets his foot off the brake, running over Ruiz's foot. Emmett calls Jack to tell him not to come pick up Marsha, who has decompensated and likely needs a ventilator. Dean's lawyer friend (and ex), Condola Vargas, Esq, has agreed to take on Dean's case against the police department for the dehumanizing experiences surrounding the kidnapped girls case. She asks him what justice looks like to him, and it takes him a while to figure it out. Gathering the other Black firefighters around him, he tells Condola that he doesn't just want justice or punishment; he wants to prevent them from doing anything like that to anyone ever again. Over at Grey Sloan, Jack takes Marcus up on a station ladder to see Marsha from outside of her hospital room. Vic goes to tell Ruiz that she is firmly behind Travis and will have to cut off her feelings for him; he explains that the day when Travis's husband died didn't just destroy Travis, but him, too. Vic hugs him right as Travis walks into the room, agape.
52	9	"No One Is Alone"	Stacey K. Black	Rochelle Zimmerman	April 1, 2021	409	4.78
Picking up where the last episode ended, Travis explodes at Vic for comforting Ruiz. Flashbacks to 2009 show Ruiz, Travis, and his husband all working together during the fire academy. Vic and Travis are put on the aid car together and respond to a drug overdose for the same person who OD'd in the car in the previous episode. A 2010 flashback shows Travis and Michael as firefighters, falling in love. It's revealed that Ruiz was Michael's roommate and best friend, and he knows all about them being gay and in love. After dropping off the overdose victim at Grey Sloan, the aid car is called back to the same address, where the man's best friend, Libbie, has also OD'd. At the station, Ruiz is helping Jack in his relationship with Marcus. In 2011, Michael and Travis adorably bought rings to propose to each other, and then double-proposed to each other while at dinner with Ruiz. Vic and Travis have a massive blow-out on the side of the road. It's 2012, and Ruiz brings champagne to the house now occupied by Travis and Michael to celebrate his being up for captain. We jump to 2016, and Travis is worried about Ruiz being Michael's captain, and literally posits the very situation of a bad call leading to Michael's death. But Michael says sometimes bad calls happen, and they work in a dangerous field. Libbie overdoses and dies in the park. One more trip back to 2016, and Travis is a wreck in his house; Ruiz comes over and explains that he miscalculated the situation and told Michael to shelter in place when he shouldn't have, leading to Michael's death. Travis throws him out. In the present, Jack and Ruiz bond over having been department pariahs.
53	10	"Save Yourself"	David Greenspan	Emily Culver	April 8, 2021	410	4.87
The team gets several surprises while they are dealing with people coming in for COVID testing at the firehouse. Travis's parents arrive for testing after his father has an exposure from "golfing." Jack tries to console young Marcus, who is despondent after the family finds out that Marsha's absent son has decided to take her off the ventilator. Carina is a control freak while running the clinic, but later reveals to Maya that she may be forced to go back to Italy due to presidential changes to immigration policy. The team responds to a call where a newlywed couple (who had just left the COVID test site) is trapped inside their car, which is trapped inside the back of a box truck. The couple got married quickly after meeting during the pandemic, and the wife's selfishness comes out strong during the extrication when she begs for the team to get her out first because she has more to live for than her new husband. (This story continues into the crossover.) Travis grapples with his father's revelations and Carina is excited when Maya volunteers to go to Italy with her. Note : This episode begins a crossover event that concludes on Grey's Anatomy season 17 episode 11.
54	11	"Here It Comes Again"	Karen Gaviola	Emmylou Diaz & Tyrone Finch	April 15, 2021	412	5.10
A pregnant couple who had needed help with car seat installation in a previous episode shows up in labor, which leads to Ben and Carina having to deliver the baby in the station. The husband had an undiagnosed heart issue and collapses during the labor, with Andy and Dean rushing him to a hospital with no empty beds because of COVID. They continue to run compressions on him while pleading for a room. Emmett warns Vic and Travis that his father, now Deputy Chief with Seattle PD, is paying the station a visit. His visit is to warn Maya that she should dissuade Dean from pursuing his lawsuit against Seattle PD. Maya tells Carina that she doesn't think she can go to Italy because of the lawsuit and her worry that her leaving will make superiors think that this is why you don't promote women. As the episode closes, the team begins to see the footage of the murder of George Floyd by the Minneapolis PD.
55	12	"Get Up, Stand Up"	Daryn Okada	Krista Vernoff	April 22, 2021	414	4.47
In light of the trauma caused by the murder of George Floyd, Maya invites back Dr. Diane Lewis to give her crew a chance to talk. Ben opens up about the struggles he experiences as a Black man in America, including raising two black boys. Diane makes Maya realize that even though it may have taken her a long time, she is doing right now by listening and learning, causing Maya to vow to actively call out injustices. In light of hate crimes against Asian-Americans spiking, Diane assures Travis that while the racism he and his mother have experienced may seem minor in comparison to recent events, any type of discrimination is unacceptable. Andy faces the fact that, having grown up around firefighters and relatively spared from racism due to her lighter skin tone and "passing as white", she has failed to recognize police brutality as a systemic problem. Vic and Diane connect through their similar views as Black women about the way George's death has been treated by the media and white friends. Diane guides Jack on how to navigate the issue at hand whilst aware of his privilege. Dean finds a safe haven in Diane's presence to let out his feelings and exhaustion. After avoiding Diane all day, Robert finally reveals the intense fear for his life that Floyd's murder has triggered for him. Meanwhile, a hypocritical Michael Dixon takes a knee during a televised press conference to show his alleged support for the Black Lives Matter movement. The next morning, the entire Station 19 crew and some of their loved ones join a Black Lives Matter protest, possibly igniting more issues with the brass of Seattle FD.
56	13	"I Guess I'm Floating"	Paris Barclay	Daniel K. Hoh	May 6, 2021	411	4.52
The station's Black firefighters are on a dinner cruise meant to celebrate Black firefighters in Seattle and the progress made over the years. Battalion Chief Gregory gives a fairly pointed speech in the general direction of Dean and his lawsuit, mentioning the need for a unified front and cooperation. Dean later confronts him and says he appreciates everything Gregory did to break barriers, Dean can't take those victories as his own, and the challenges are different now. The chief has a coronary episode and falls overboard. Dean immediately jumps in to help, and Ben sees this and tries to alert the crew before grabbing a life vest and life ring and jumping after them. In flashbacks, we see Ben and Miranda trying to spend some quality time together when she feels what she thinks is a growth. They go to see a urologist across town, who thinks it's likely cancer and recommends removing a testicle immediately. Flashback Dean is shocked by the arrival of JJ's parents at his doorstep; they've come from Hong Kong to see their grandchild, having only learned of Prue when JJ breezed through Hong Kong recently. Back in the water, Dean and Ben try to do compressions and other life-saving measures on the chief, but they are unable to save him. The boat disappears out of sight, unaware of the three men overboard. Suddenly Dean and Ben have to work on their own survival, while discussing many things like the George Floyd murder, Ben's testicular cancer and his not having scheduled the procedure, and Dean's strange dinner with his parents and JJ's parents (who are revealed to own a large portion of Seattle land). Eventually they're forced to abandon the chief's body and they try to share Ben's life jacket, but Dean says he thinks he needs to let go. Fade to black. Both Dean and Ben come to consciousness on the beach, having been found by a rescue boat. Miranda arrives, followed by Vic. Vic tells Dean she didn't know what to do so she went to the house boat to be with Prue all night. Dean tries to say "I love you" to her but can't get it out, and she says "I love you, too."
57	14	"Comfortably Numb"	Peter Paige	Kiley Donovan	May 20, 2021	413	4.92
Ben confronts his fears as he goes in for his surgery, where he has some heavy hallucinations. Maya and Carina discuss their problems with their relationship as Carina prepares to leave for Italy; topics include Carina not wanting to get married but still wanting to have a baby, plus Carina's feeling that Maya has not bothered to pay attention to the visa situation. Jack and Inara are finally alone for a while, but as things get heated up they are interrupted by the sight of their upstairs neighbor falling past their window. They spend most of the day trying to save her from both the literal and figurative dumpsters she is in. Carina's friend Gabriella calls from Italy and tells Carina she's silly for not accepting Maya's proposal, which leads Carina to finding Maya at the hospital where she proposes, instead.
58	15	"Say Her Name"	Oliver Bokelberg	Zaiver Sinnett & Rochelle Zimmerman	May 27, 2021	415	4.59
Vic finds herself in need of a day off from everything related to Black Lives Matter while the rest of the crew prepares to set up a medical post at the protest to aid civilians hurt in confrontations with Seattle PD. The crew is called out to a fire started by rioters at Vic's parents' restaurant. The team manage to save the building. Vic, Travis and Theo stay behind to help clean up. Vic confronts her parents with the fact that their strategy of not talking about emotions does not appear to be working. Her mother reveals they kept track of her life in a room dedicated to commemorate all of her accomplishments. Later, the Hughes family tell a reporter that the loss of their property pales in comparison to the loss of numerous Black lives. Travis begins to forgive Theo as they work. When the City forbids the crew's plans for the medical post, they decide to proceed as planned as civilians. Dean convinces Maya to have a real wedding to bring the crew some joy.
59	16	"Forever and Ever, Amen"	Paris Barclay	Kiley Donovan	June 3, 2021	416	4.90
Carina has returned to Seattle after a month in Italy. Two days before her wedding to Maya, the crew responds to a house fire. At the scene, Maya openly defies a direct order from Fire Chief McCallister in order to save a boy's life. The Fire Chief confides in Sullivan that the incident will allow him to close down Station 19, given all the troubles it has caused with the Seattle PD under Maya's captainship. Sullivan advocates for a promotion for himself to get everyone back in line. Unbeknownst to the rest of the crew, this causes a rift with Andy, who deems him opportunistic. At the wedding, hosted at a renovated Kaminski's, Travis reunites with Emmett while Victoria gives in to her romantic feelings for Theo after approval from Travis. Dean catches them kissing just as he decided to tell Vic about his feelings after encouragement from Ben and Bailey. Inara breaks up with Jack as she realizes he is not in love with her; she thanks him for saving her and moves in with her sister in California. Maya's mother once again breaks free from her abusive husband to attend the wedding. As the newlyweds dance, the rest of the guests receive word that Maya has been relieved of her duties.

== Cast and characters ==
=== Main ===
- Jaina Lee Ortiz as Andrea "Andy" Herrera
- Jason George as Benjamin “Ben” Warren
- Boris Kodjoe as Robert Sullivan
- Grey Damon as Jack Gibson
- Barrett Doss as Victoria "Vic" Hughes
- Jay Hayden as Travis Montgomery
- Okieriete Onaodowan as Dean Miller
- Danielle Savre as Maya Bishop
- Stefania Spampinato as Dr. Carina DeLuca

=== Recurring ===
- Jayne Taini as Marsha Smith
- Jeanne Sakata as Nari Montgomery
- Colleen Foy as Inara
- Ansel Sluyter-Obidos as Marcus
- James Pickens Jr. as Dr. Richard Webber
- Pat Healy as Michael Dixon
- Lachlan Buchanan as Emmett Dixon
- Carlos Miranda as Theodore “Theo” Ruiz
- Robert Curtis Brown as Paul Montgomery

=== Notable guests ===
- Chandra Wilson as Dr. Miranda Bailey
- Kevin McKidd as Dr. Owen Hunt
- BJ Tanner as William George “Tuck” Jones
- Caterina Scorsone as Dr. Amelia Shepherd
- Jaicy Elliot as Dr. Taryn Helm
- Miguel Sandoval as Pruitt Herrera
- Giacomo Gianniotti as Dr. Andrew DeLuca
- Khalilah Joi as Condola Vargas
- Jonathan Bennett as Michael Williams
- Zaiver Sinnett as Dr. Zander Perez
- Jake Borelli as Dr. Levi Schmitt
- Barbara Eve Harris as Ifeya Miller
- Tracie Thoms as Dr. Diane Lewis
- Jeffrey D. Sams as Bill Miller

== Production ==
=== Development ===
On March 11, 2020, the series was renewed for a fourth season with Krista Vernoff continuing as showrunner. Shonda Rhimes and Betsy Beers remained executive producers, and Paris Barclay remained executive producer and producing director. After production delays due to the COVID-19 pandemic, production began in September 2020. Despite being set during the COVID-19 pandemic, Vernoff said the season would feature joy its fictional world. She also wanted to explore the pandemic's cost on the first responder community. Vernoff also wrote an episode showing the characters' reactions to the murder of George Floyd amid other racial issues. Its midseason premiere was delayed a week to account for unpredictable production delays due to the pandemic.

=== Casting ===
The entire main cast from the third season, except for Miguel Sandoval, returned for the fourth season. Stefania Spampinato was upped to series regular after recurring the previous season. Miguel Sandoval appeared as a guest star this season after being a series regular for the first three seasons. In December 2020, it was reported that Robert Curtis Brown would appear in a recurring role as Travis' father. In March 2021, it was reported that Khalilah Joi, who played a different character on Grey's Anatomy, was cast as a lawyer with a history with Dean.

== Release ==
When the 2020–21 United States network television schedule was announced, Station 19 would remain on Thursdays at 8:00 PM. The season premiered on November 12, 2020, with a crossover event. Its mid-season finale aired on December 17, 2020, with another crossover. After a delay of one week, the season continued on March 11, 2021, with a third crossover. The season finale aired June 3.

== Reception ==
=== Awards and nominations ===
Barrett Doss received an honorable mention for TVLine's Performer of the Week for her performance in "Train in Vain". Okieriete Onaodowan received an honorable mention for TVLine's Performer of the Week for his performance in "Get Up, Stand Up". The season was also awarded The ReFrame Stamp, a certification given to scripted television productions that hire "female-identifying people in four out of eight critical areas of production: writer, director, producer, lead, co-lead, speaking parts, department heads, and crew."

=== Ratings ===
The season was ABC's second most-watched scripted television series during the 2020–2021 television season in the 18-49 demographic. Throughout its broadcast, in same-day viewership, the season averaged a 0.83 rating (Note: In Nielsen ratings, a rating is a fraction of the total number of households with televisions compared to the number of television sets tuned into a specific program.) in the 18–49 demographic and 5.18 million viewers, down 21 and 20 percent, respectively, from the previous season. In Live+7 (Note: Live+7 data includes the number of viewers watching episodes within seven days of its original broadcast by means of DVR and streaming video on demand.) the season averaged a 1.3 rating in the 18–49 demographic and 7.1 million viewers, down 13 and 17 percent from the third season.

Viewership and ratings per episode of Station 19 season 4
No.	Title	Air date	Rating (18–49)	Viewers (millions)	DVR (18–49)	DVR viewers (millions)	Total (18–49)	Total viewers (millions)
1	"Nothing Seems the Same"	November 12, 2020	1.2	6.59	0.5	2.28	1.7	8.89
2	"Wild World"	November 19, 2020	1.0	5.66	—N/a	—N/a	—N/a	—N/a
3	"We Are Family"	December 3, 2020	0.9	5.58	0.4	1.68	1.2	7.27
4	"Don't Look Back in Anger"	December 10, 2020	0.8	5.58	0.4	1.89	1.3	7.47
5	"Out of Control"	December 17, 2020	1.0	5.63	—N/a	—N/a	—N/a	—N/a
6	"Train in Vain"	March 11, 2021	0.9	5.40	0.5	2.17	1.3	7.58
7	"Learning to Fly"	March 18, 2021	0.8	5.10	—N/a	—N/a	—N/a	—N/a
8	"Make No Mistake, He's Mine"	March 25, 2021	0.8	5.26	—N/a	—N/a	—N/a	—N/a
9	"No One Is Alone"	April 1, 2021	0.8	4.78	0.3	1.41	1.1	6.20 (Note: Live+7 ratings were not available, so Live+3 ratings have been used instead.)
10	"Save Yourself"	April 8, 2021	0.8	4.87	0.5	2.08	1.2	6.95
11	"Here It Comes Again"	April 15, 2021	0.8	5.10	—N/a	—N/a	—N/a	—N/a
12	"Get Up, Stand Up"	April 22, 2021	0.7	4.47	0.4	1.77	1.1	6.24
13	"I Guess I'm Floating"	May 6, 2021	0.8	4.52	0.4	1.83	1.2	6.35
14	"Comfortably Numb"	May 20, 2021	0.8	4.92	0.3	1.79	1.2	6.72
15	"Say Her Name"	May 27, 2021	0.7	4.59	0.4	1.78	1.0	6.36
16	"Forever and Ever, Amen"	June 3, 2021	0.7	4.90	0.4	1.66	1.1	6.56
