= Station 19 =

American action-drama television series

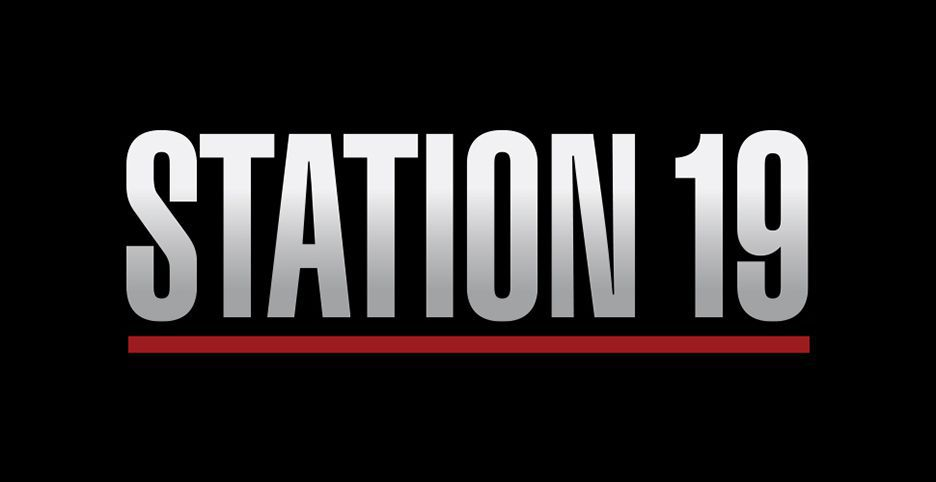
- Genre: Action; Procedural drama
- Created by: Stacy McKee
- Based on: Grey's Anatomy by Shonda Rhimes
- Showrunners: Stacy McKee; Shonda Rhimes; Krista Vernoff; Peter Paige; Zoanne Clack
- Starring: Jaina Lee Ortiz; Jason George; Grey Damon; Barrett Doss; Danielle Savre; Alberto Frezza; Jay Hayden; Okieriete Onaodowan; Miguel Sandoval; Boris Kodjoe; Stefania Spampinato; Carlos Miranda; Josh Randall; Merle Dandridge; Pat Healy
- Narrated by: Jaina Lee Ortiz
- Composer: Photek
- Country of origin: United States
- Original language: English
- No. of seasons: 7
- No. of episodes: 105 (list of episodes)

Production
- Executive producers: Stacy McKee; Shonda Rhimes; Betsy Beers; Paris Barclay; Krista Vernoff; Ellen Pompeo
- Producers: Tia Napolitano; Anupam Nigam; Jim Campolongo; Trey Callaway; Angela Harvey; Phillip Iscove; Christine Larson-Nitzsche; Alexandre Schmitt; Tyrone Finch; Emmylou Diaz; Michael Metzner
- Production locations: Los Angeles, California
- Running time: 40–43 minutes
- Production companies: Trip the Light (seasons 4–6); Shondaland; ABC Signature (Note: Credited as ABC Studios through season 3)

Original release
- Network: ABC
- Release: March 22, 2018 – May 30, 2024

Related
- Grey's Anatomy

Station 19 is an American action and procedural drama television series created by Stacy McKee that premiered on the American Broadcasting Company (ABC) on March 22, 2018. It is the second spin-off of Grey's Anatomy (after Private Practice). Set in Seattle, the series focuses on the lives of the men and women at Seattle Fire Station 19. The main cast includes Jaina Lee Ortiz, Jason George, Grey Damon, Barrett Doss, Alberto Frezza, Jay Hayden, Okieriete Onaodowan, Danielle Savre, Miguel Sandoval, Boris Kodjoe, Stefania Spampinato, Carlos Miranda, Josh Randall, Merle Dandridge, and Pat Healy.

McKee, Shonda Rhimes, Betsy Beers, and Paris Barclay served as executive producers on the series. It was produced by Shondaland, with McKee serving as the showrunner for its first 2 seasons. She was later replaced by Krista Vernoff, who was the showrunner from season 3 onwards.

In May 2017, the spin-off received a series order from ABC. Ortiz was cast in July 2017, and the rest of the cast was finalized by October 2017. Filming for the series primarily took place in Los Angeles. In January 2022, the series was renewed for a sixth season, which premiered on October 6, 2022. In April 2023, the series was renewed for a seventh season. In December 2023, it was announced that the seventh season, which consists of only ten episodes, would be its last. The seventh and final season premiered on March 14, 2024. Station 19 concluded on May 30, 2024, after seven seasons and 105 episodes.

== Premise ==
The series follows a group of firefighters from the Seattle Fire Department at fictional Station 19, focusing on their personal and professional lives. From the captain down the ranks to the newest recruit, the show explores the challenges they face both in the line of duty and in their relationships outside of work.

== Cast and characters ==
=== Main ===
= Main cast (credited)
= Recurring cast (3+)
= Guest cast (1-2)

Portrayed by	Character	Seasons						
Portrayed by	Character	1	2	3	4	5	6	7
Jaina Lee Ortiz	Andrea "Andy" Herrera	Main	Main	Main	Main	Main	Main	Main
Jason George	Dr. Benjamin "Ben" Warren	Main	Main	Main	Main	Main	Main	Main
Grey Damon	Jack Gibson	Main (Note: Grey Damon is only credited for episodes in which he appears through season 7)	Main	Main	Main	Main	Main	Main
Barrett Doss	Victoria "Vic" Hughes	Main	Main	Main	Main	Main	Main	Main
Alberto Frezza	Ryan Tanner	Main	Main	Recurring				
Jay Hayden	Travis Montgomery	Main	Main	Main	Main	Main	Main	Main
Okieriete Onaodowan	Dean Miller	Main (Note: Okieriete Onaodowan is credited through the fifth episode of Season 5.)	Main	Main	Main	Main		Guest
Danielle Savre	Maya Bishop	Main	Main	Main	Main	Main	Main	Main
Miguel Sandoval	Pruitt Herrera	Main	Main	Main	Guest			
Boris Kodjoe	Robert Sullivan		Main (Note: Boris Kodjoe is credited as a guest star for the first six episodes of Season 2 before being promoted to series regular in the seventh episode.)	Main	Main	Main	Main	Main
Stefania Spampinato	Dr. Carina DeLuca			Recurring	Main	Main	Main	Main
Carlos Miranda	Theo Ruiz				Recurring	Main	Main	Main
Josh Randall	Sean Beckett					Recurring	Main	Main
Merle Dandridge	Natasha Ross					Recurring	Main	Main
Pat Healy	Michael Dixon			Recurring	Recurring	Guest	Main	

Cast notes

- Jaina Lee Ortiz as Andrea "Andy" Herrera: A Lieutenant at Station 19 and the headstrong daughter of Captain Pruitt Herrera. She was a Co-Acting Captain of Station 19. In the season 2 finale and in season 3, her new love interest is the new captain, Robert Sullivan, whom she marries prior to her father's death. In season 5 she is transferred to Station 23. She is now the new Captain at Station 19 and then the fire chief in the future.
- Jason George as Dr. Benjamin "Ben" Warren, MD: A firefighter and PRT Physician at Station 19 and a former anesthesiologist-turned-surgical-resident at Grey Sloan Memorial Hospital. He is married to Miranda Bailey, a surgeon at Grey-Sloan Memorial Hospital, whom he met in season 6 of Grey's Anatomy as an anesthesiologist. He tends to break rules in pursuit of saving lives.
- Grey Damon as Jack Gibson: Lieutenant at Station 19. He is passionate, energetic, and fearless. He was one of Station 19's Co-Acting Captains, along with Herrera in season 1. He is a foster kid who had a hard childhood and seeks family. In the beginning of season 7, he won't be able to be a firefighter anymore because of his head injury and subsequent CTE diagnosis.
- Barrett Doss as Victoria "Vic" Hughes: A younger, big-hearted firefighter at Station 19. Hughes is close friends with her fellow firefighters, especially Travis and Dean. She was engaged to Fire Chief Ripley until his death in season 2. She also dates Jackson Avery who works at Grey Sloan Memorial Hospital and later Theo Ruiz.
- Alberto Frezza as Ryan Tanner (main seasons 1–2, recurring season 3): A police officer at Seattle PD. He and Andy were longtime friends and had a romantic relationship in high school. He was shot in the second episode of season 3, and died in the third episode.
- Jay Hayden as Travis Montgomery: An openly gay firefighter and the heart of Station 19. He struggles with homophobia from his father, but they later reconcile. Montgomery is a widower, having lost his husband Michael, a fellow firefighter. In season six, he runs for mayor of Seattle against Michael Dixon. He moves to Washington, D.C. with Vic in the final episode to help her run Crisis One.
- Okieriete Onaodowan as Dean Miller (seasons 1–5; guest season 7): A charismatic firefighter at Station 19. In season 3, he becomes a dad to a baby girl he names after Cpt. Pruitt Herrera. In season 5, he is mortally wounded following a gas explosion at a call and dies en route to the hospital. He writes Ben in his will to adopt Pru, and Pru later joins Station 19. He founded Crisis One - an outreach program to avoid police intervention and help marginalised people in the wake of the BLM protests in lockdown, which Vic takes over following his death.
- Danielle Savre as Maya Bishop: A bisexual, Type-A Lieutenant, and later Captain, at Station 19 and a former Olympic athlete. She struggles with her mental health following a difficult childhood from her abusive father. She is Carina's wife and they have three children together.
- Miguel Sandoval as Pruitt Herrera (seasons 1–3, guest season 4): Captain at Station 19, Andy's father, and a mentor to her and her coworkers. He steps down from his role in the series premiere, and later dies in season 3 while at the scene of a fire call, saving Andy's life.
- Boris Kodjoe as Robert Sullivan (seasons 2–7): The new Captain at Station 19 who recently returned to Seattle. In "Eulogy", he is promoted to Battalion Chief. Prior to being Captain he was the General at the Academy where Miller and Gibson were training. He was once best friends with Chief Ripley but their friendship faded when Robert moved to Montana after his wife's death. They later reconnect. Sullivan has complex regional pain syndrome (CRPS). In the season 2 finale and season 3, he becomes Andy's new love interest.
- Stefania Spampinato as Dr. Carina DeLuca (seasons 4–7; recurring season 3): An Italian OB/GYN Attending at Grey Sloan Memorial Hospital and Maya's wife. They have 3 kids together. She is Andrew De Luca's older sister.
- Carlos Miranda as Theo Ruiz (seasons 5–7; recurring season 4): Lieutenant at Station 23 and Michael Williams' old captain and Travis' friend, who later is transferred to Station 19. He dates Vic in seasons 4-6.
- Josh Randall as Fire Captain Sean Beckett (seasons 6–7; recurring season 5): The newly appointed Fire Captain of Station 19. He is smug, chauvinistic, and rather incompetent at his job. He cares more about maintaining a good appearance for the station as he fails to understand the value of Station 19's engine, which was dedicated to Captain Pruitt Herrera, when it was destroyed in a gas fire. He can be sexist and butts heads with Maya after she seeks his job. He has an alcohol addiction but he later redeems himself with the support of Vic and develops close friendships with the team and dates Chief Ross' sister. Robert helps him deal with his addiction.
- Merle Dandridge as Fire Chief Natasha Ross (seasons 6–7; recurring season 5): the new Fire Chief for the Seattle Fire Department as the replacement for Chief McCallister. She has a romantic past with Robert from serving in the Marines. She is the first female and woman of colour fire chief in Seattle and later marries Robert.
- Pat Healy as Fire Chief Michael Dixon (season 6; recurring seasons 3–4; guest season 5): The new Fire Chief for the Seattle Fire Department as the replacement of Lucas Ripley. He returned to be a police officer after he was fired at the end of season 3. In season 6, he announced his candidacy for mayor but he dies at the Firefighter Ball. He is very traditional, sexist, homophobic and conservative and seeks to shut down Station 19's community programs such as Crisis One.

=== Recurring ===
- Marla Gibbs as Edith (season 1): A feisty retirement home retiree who sets up Travis with her grandson, Grant.
- Brett Tucker as Fire Chief Lucas Ripley (seasons 1–2, guest season 3): The Fire Chief for Seattle Fire Department who was engaged to Vic. He dies after a fire and leaves behind his friends and colleagues at the Seattle Fire Department.
- Brenda Song as JJ (seasons 1 & 3): A music reviewer who Dean saves from a fire and later begins to date. In season three, she has a baby with Dean, but she left as she feels incompetent in motherhood.
- Sterling Sulieman as Grant (seasons 1–2): The sous chef grandson of Edith who she sets up with Travis.
- Dermot Mulroney as Greg Tanner (season 2): Ryan's father.
- Birgundi Baker as Yemi Miller (season 2), Dean's sister in law school.
- Rigo Sanchez as Rigo Vasquez (season 3; guest season 6): A firefighter at Station 19. He has problems working with Jack Gibson because he slept with Rigo's wife. The tension between the two comes to a head at the firehouse and while on a call he gets injured during a rescue and before being discharged out of the hospital, he dies.
- Kelly Thiebaud as Eva Vasquez (seasons 3, 6): Rigo's wife. She had a toxic sexual relationship with Jack.
- Lachlan Buchanan as Emmett Dixon (seasons 3–5, 7): A probationary firefighter at Station 19 and the son of Fire Chief Dixon. He broke up with Travis and left to attend art school in Florence in Season 5.
- Jayne Taini as Marsha Smith (seasons 3–4; guest seasons 5-6): An elderly woman who becomes a maternal figure for Gibson. She takes in Inara and Marcus.
- Colleen Foy as Inara (season 4; guest season 3): A friend of Jack after he rescued her and her son from an abusive husband.
- Ansel Sluyter-Obidos as Marcus (season 4; guest season 3): Inara's son who is deaf. He communicates with people through ASL.
- Robert Curtis Brown as Paul Montgomery (seasons 4–5): Travis' closeted dad. He was also portrayed by Kenneth Meseroll in season 3 and one episode of season 4.
- Jeanne Sakata as Nari Montgomery (season 4; guest season 5): Travis’ mom.
- Lindsey Gort as Ingrid Saunders (season 5): a widow whose shop caught fire. She had a crush on Ben Warren until she found out he was married.
- Alain Uy as Captain Pat Aquino (season 5): The Fire Captain of Station 23 who is injured in the explosion which killed Dean.
- Natasha Ward as Deja Duval (season 5): A probie firefighter at Station 23 that Andy is mentoring as she's the only other woman there.
- Barbara Eve Harris as Ifeya Miller (season 5; guest seasons 2 & 4): Dean's mom who is very controlling and insensitive to her son's wishes.
- Jeffrey D. Sams as Bill Miller (season 5; guest seasons 2 & 4): Dean's dad.
- Jennifer Jalene as Luisa Berrol (season 5): Andy's lawyer after her assault.
- Rob Heaps as Eli Stern (seasons 6–7): Travis’ campaign manager when he runs for mayor.
- Emerson Brooks as Robel Osman (season 6–7): The new mayor of Seattle.
- Tricia O’Kelley as Kitty Dixon (season 6; guest season 5, 7): Dixon’s wife and Emmett's mother, she is an alcoholic.
- Kiele Sanchez as Kate Powell (seasons 6–7): An old friend of Ruiz from him and Michael's old station.

=== Notable guests ===
- Jee Young Han as Charlotte Dearborn (seasons 1–2): The Fire Lieutenant of Station 12, who competes against Herrera and Gibson for Captain. She is reckless and doesn't follow protocol.
- Patrick Duffy as Terry (season 2) who appears in the episode "Into the Wildfire".
- Nyle DiMarco as Dylan (season 2): A deaf firefighter who appears in the episode "Into the Wildfire". He and Travis kiss.
- Jonathan Bennett as Michael Williams (seasons 3–4): Travis’ deceased husband and Ruiz's best friend
- Tracie Thoms as Dr. Diane Lewis (seasons 3–6): A Psychologist and Trauma Specialist who assisted and evaluated professional and personal concerns of the staff at Station 19 have individually. She was a firefighter before an injury put her out of commission. She joins Vic in Crisis One and encourages Vic to take psychology classes.
- Khalilah Joi as Condola Vargas (season 4): a lawyer who has a romantic history with Dean and represents him after his wrongful arrest
- Michael Grant Terry as Officer Jones (season 6): a racist Police Officer who appears in the episode "We Build Then We Break".
- Joel McKinnon Miller as Reggie (season 6): a man who comes to the station in "Never Gonna Give You Up" after being bitten by a black venom spider, who Ben helps.

=== Grey's Anatomy ===
- Chandra Wilson as Miranda Bailey (recurring seasons 1, 3, 5–6; guest seasons 2, 4, 7): former Chief of Surgery at Grey Sloan Memorial Hospital and Ben Warren's wife and later Pru's adoptive mother.
- Ellen Pompeo as Meredith Grey (guest seasons 1, 3 and 6): former Chief of General Surgery at Grey Sloan Memorial Hospital.
- Jaicy Elliot as Taryn Helm (guest seasons 3–7): A surgical resident at Grey Sloan Memorial Hospital and briefly bartender at Joe's.
- BJ Tanner as William George “Tuck” Jones (seasons 1, 3–5): Warren's stepson, who later graduates from NYU.
- Jake Borelli as Levi Schmitt (guest seasons 1–4): A surgical resident at Grey Sloan Memorial Hospital.
- Giacomo Gianniotti as Andrew DeLuca (guest seasons 2, 4): A surgical resident, and later general surgery attending at Grey Sloan Memorial Hospital, and the younger brother of Carina DeLuca. He has bipolar like their father. He is stabbed when stopping a human trafficker.
- Kelly McCreary as Maggie Pierce (guest seasons 2–3, 6): Co-Chief of Cardiothoracic Surgery at Grey Sloan Memorial Hospital who Dean has a crush on.
- Jesse Williams as Jackson Avery (recurring season 3): Chief of Plastic Surgery at Grey Sloan Memorial Hospital who dates Vic in season 3 and works in the PRT with Ben.
- Caterina Scorsone as Amelia Shepherd (guest seasons 3–4, 6-7): Chief of Neurosurgery at Grey Sloan Memorial Hospital who helps Robert battle his addiction.
- Kevin McKidd as Owen Hunt (guest seasons 3–5): Chief of Trauma Surgery at Grey Sloan Memorial Hospital.
- Greg Germann as Tom Koracick (guest season 3): Chief of Hospitals at Catherine Fox Foundation, Attending Neurosurgeon at Grey Sloan Memorial Hospital.
- Kim Raver as Teddy Altman (guest seasons 3, 5–6): Chief of surgery, Co-Chief of Cardiothoracic Surgery and former Chief of Trauma Surgery at Grey Sloan Memorial Hospital.
- Alex Landi as Nico Kim (recurring season 3): Doctor at Grey Sloan Memorial Hospital and Levi's boyfriend.
- Alex Blue Davis as Casey Parker (guest season 3): A surgical resident at Grey Sloan Memorial Hospital.
- Vivian Nixon as Hannah Brody (guest season 3): A surgical resident at Grey Sloan Memorial Hospital.
- Devin Way as Blake Simms (guest season 3): A surgical resident at Grey Sloan Memorial Hospital.
- James Pickens Jr. as Richard Webber (recurring season 4, guest season 5): Chief Medical Officer, Senior Attending General Surgeon, Director of the Residency Program and former Chief of Surgery at Grey Sloan Memorial Hospital. He becomes Sullivan's addict recovery sponsor.
- Zaiver Sinnett as Zander Perez (guest season 4): A surgical resident at Grey Sloan Memorial Hospital.
- Niko Terho as Lucas Adams (guest season 6): A surgical resident at Grey Sloan Memorial Hospital and Amelia's and Meredith's nephew.
- Anthony Hill as Winston Ndugu (guest season 6): A Cardiothoracic Surgery attending at Grey Sloan Memorial Hospital.
- Harry Shum Jr. as Benson "Blue" Kwan (guest season 6): A surgical resident at Grey Sloan Memorial Hospital.
- Aniela Gumbs as Zola Grey Shepherd (guest season 6): Meredith Grey's daughter and Amelia's niece.

== Episodes ==
Season	Episodes	Originally released		Average U.S. viewers (millions)
Season	Episodes	First released	Last released	Average U.S. viewers (millions)
Backdoor pilot		March 1, 2018		7.52
1	10	March 22, 2018	May 17, 2018	5.27
2	17	October 4, 2018	May 16, 2019	5.29
3	16	January 23, 2020	May 14, 2020	6.46
4	16	November 12, 2020	June 3, 2021	5.18
5	18	September 30, 2021	May 19, 2022	4.47
6	18	October 6, 2022	May 18, 2023	3.86
7	10	March 14, 2024	May 30, 2024	2.45

== Production ==
=== Development ===
On May 16, 2017, American Broadcasting Company chief Channing Dungey announced at ABC's upfront presentation that the network had given a straight-to-series order for a second television series. Stacy McKee, a long-time Grey's Anatomy writer and executive producer, would serve as showrunner and executive producer, with Shonda Rhimes and Betsy Beers also serving as executive producers. The series, set in a Seattle Firehousee station, would follow the lives of a group of firefighters. The order consisted of 10 episodes. When announcing the series, Dungey stated, "No one can interweave the jeopardy firefighters face in the line of duty with the drama in their personal lives quite like Shonda, and Grey's signature Seattle setting is the perfect backdrop for this exciting spin-off." Patrick Moran, president at ABC Studios, added, "We talked [with Shonda] about the elements of Grey's Anatomy that seem to resonate with the audience—emotional storytelling, deep human connection, a high-stakes environment, and strong and empowered women—and those elements will carry over to the spin-off."

In July 2017, Paris Barclay signed on to the series as producing director and executive producer. In January 2018, it was announced that Ellen Pompeo had renewed her contract to portray Meredith Grey through Season 16 of Grey's, in addition to becoming a producer on the show and a co-executive producer on the spin-off. Later that month, ABC announced that the series would be titled Station 19.

An episode of Grey's Anatomy, originally planned to air in fall 2017 but instead airing in March 2018, served as a backdoor pilot for the series. The backdoor pilot episode featured the introduction of the lead character of the spin-off, Andy Herrera, "as a story within the episode" and "showcase a really lovely story for Ben, where we get to juxtapose his two worlds and see his reaction as he transitions from one world to the next."

On May 11, 2018, ABC renewed the series for a second season. The second season premiered on October 4, 2018. On October 19, 2018, it was announced that ABC had ordered a full season for the second season. On May 10, 2019, the series was renewed for a third season, which premiered on January 23, 2020, with Krista Vernoff as showrunner. On March 11, 2020, the series was renewed for a fourth season, which premiered on November 12, 2020. On May 10, 2021, ABC renewed the series for a fifth season, which premiered on September 30, 2021. On January 11, 2022, ABC renewed the series for a sixth season, which premiered on October 6, 2022. On April 20, 2023, ABC renewed the series for a seventh season, with Zoanne Clack and Peter Paige serving as the new showrunners and executive producers. The seventh season premiered on March 14, 2024. On December 8, 2023, it was announced that the seventh season would be its final season.

=== Casting ===
On July 26, 2017, Jaina Lee Ortiz was cast as the female lead, Andrea "Andy" Herrera. In September 2017, it was announced that Jason George, who had played Dr. Ben Warren since Season 6 of Grey's Anatomy, would be leaving the series to join the spin-off as a series regular. On October 6, 2017, Grey Damon was cast as Lieutenant Jack Gibson, Jay Hayden as Travis Montgomery, Okieriete Onaodowan as Dean Miller, Danielle Savre as Maya Bishop, and Barrett Doss as Victoria "Vic" Hughes. They were shortly followed by Miguel Sandoval as Captain Pruitt Herrera, and Alberto Frezza as police officer Ryan Tanner.

For Season 2, Boris Kodjoe was cast in a recurring role as Robert Sullivan in July 2018, and was later promoted to a series regular. Frezza made his final appearance in Season 3. Also, Stefania Spampinato began appearing as Dr. Carina DeLuca, and Pat Healy began appearing as Michael Dixon. In July 2020, Spampinato was promoted to series regular. Sandoval made his final appearance in Season 4. Carlos Miranda began appearing as Theo Ruiz in the fourth season and became a series regular in Season 5. Onaodowan left partway through the fifth season after requesting to depart. In the same season, Josh Randall and Merle Dandridge began recurring as Sean Beckett and Natasha Ross, respectively, and both actors, along with Healy, became series regulars in Season 6.

=== Filming ===
Filming for Season 1 began on October 18, 2017, and concluded on April 2, 2018. Filming for the series primarily takes place in Los Angeles, with additional filming in Seattle. The fire station in Station 19 is based on Seattle Fire Station 20, located in the Queen Anne neighborhood of Seattle.

== Release ==
=== Broadcast ===
In the United States, Station 19 began airing on March 22, 2018, in the Thursday 9:00 PM ET timeslot on ABC, following the parent series Grey's Anatomy. Starting with Season 3, Station 19 moved to the Thursday 8:00 PM ET timeslot. After the COVID-19 pandemic truncated production of Grey's Anatomy, Station 19 was temporarily moved to Thursdays at 9:00 PM for the final four episodes of the season. Station 19 resumed its 8:00 PM ET timeslot at the beginning of Season 4.

Outside the United States, CTV acquired the broadcast rights for Canada. Sky Living acquired the rights to air the series in the UK and Ireland. The show later moved to Disney+, where full seasons are available in Canada following their release on the CTV network.

=== Marketing ===
In early December 2017, Entertainment Weekly released first look images of the series.

== Reception ==
=== Critical response ===
For Season 1, the review aggregator website Rotten Tomatoes reported a 65% approval rating, with an average rating of 6/10 based on 17 reviews. The website's consensus reads, "Fans will bask in the familiar glow from Station 19, though anyone who doesn't already indulge in the soapy delights of Shondaland may not feel the spark." Metacritic, which uses a weighted average, assigned a score of 55 out of 100 based on 10 critics, indicating "mixed or average reviews."

=== Ratings ===
Viewership and ratings per season of Station 19
Season	Timeslot (ET)	Episodes	First aired		Last aired		TV season	Viewership rank	Avg. viewers (millions)	18–49 rank	Avg. 18–49 rating
Season	Timeslot (ET)	Episodes	Date	Viewers (millions)	Date	Viewers (millions)	TV season	Viewership rank	Avg. viewers (millions)	18–49 rank	Avg. 18–49 rating
1	Thursday 9:00 p.m.	10	March 22, 2018	5.43	May 17, 2018	5.10	2017–18	54	7.36	41	1.7
2	Thursday 9:00 p.m.	17	October 4, 2018	5.17	May 16, 2019	4.82	2018–19	53	7.37	36	1.6
3	Thursday 8:00 p.m. (1–12); Thursday 9:00 p.m. (13–16)	16	January 23, 2020	7.02	May 14, 2020	5.91	2019–20	29	8.52	23	1.5
4	Thursday 8:00 p.m.	16	November 12, 2020	6.59	June 3, 2021	4.90	2020–21	29	7.11	18	1.3
5	Thursday 8:00 p.m.	18	September 30, 2021	5.04	May 19, 2022	4.28	2021–22	37	6.16	28	0.9
6	Thursday 8:00 p.m.	18	October 6, 2022	4.20	May 18, 2023	3.72	2022–23	TBD	TBD	TBD	TBD
7	Thursday 10:00 p.m.	10	March 14, 2024	2.79	May 30, 2024	2.90	2023–24	TBD	TBD	TBD	TBD

=== Accolades ===
Year	Award	Category	Recipient(s)s	Result	Ref.
2018	Imagen Awards	Best Primetime Program – Drama	Station 19	Won	
2019	Media Access Awards	SAG-AFTRA Harold Russell Award	Nyle DiMarco	Won	
2019	Il Festival Nazionale del Doppiaggio Voci nell'Ombra	Best Supporting Voice	Eugenio Nicola Marinelli	Won	
2019	Young Artist Awards	Best Performance in a TV Series - Guest Starring Young Actress	Emma Rosales	Nominated	
2021	ReFrame Stamp	IMDbPro Top 200 Scripted TV Recipients	Station 19	Won	
2022	Autostraddle TV Awards	Fan Favorite LGBTQ+ Character	Station 19	Won	
2022	Autostraddle TV Awards	Fan Favorite Couple	Station 19	Won	
2024	GLAAD Media Awards	Outstanding Drama Series	Station 19	Nominated	
2024	Tell-Tale TV Awards	Favorite Network Drama Series	Station 19	Won	
2024	Tell-Tale TV Awards	Favorite Performer in a Network Drama Series	Danielle Savre	Won	
2024	Tell-Tale TV Awards	Favorite Performer in a Network Drama Series	Stefania Spampinato	Won	
