= Crazy Train (disambiguation) =

"Crazy Train" is a song by Ozzy Osbourne.

Crazy Train may also refer to:

- "Crazy Train" (The Cleveland Show), a 2013 television episode
- "Crazy Train" (Modern Family), a 2016 television episode
- "Crazy Train" (NCIS: Los Angeles), a 2016 television episode
- "Crazy Train" (Station 19), a 2019 television episode
