= PFF =

PFF may refer to:

== Entertainment ==
- Prishtina International Film Festival, Kosovo
- Pinoy Fear Factor, Philippines' Fear Factor Franchise

== Military history ==
- The Pathfinder Force, the World War II target-marking bomber group
- Palestine Final Fortress, the World War II British defense plan for Mandatory Palestine in 1942
- People's Fighter's Front, Baloch nationalist militant organization in Iran

== Sports ==
- Pakistan Football Federation, the main football association in Pakistan
- PFF Futsaliga, Futsal competition in the Philippines
- Philippine Football Federation, the main football association in the Philippines
- Pro Football Focus, a website devoted to analysis of the National Football League

== Other ==
- Partei für Freiheit und Fortschritt, the Belgian liberal party in the East Cantons
- Parafluorofentanyl, a synthetic opioid
- Acroynym for Probationary Firefighter
