= Probationary firefighter =

Firefighter rank

A probationary firefighter (PFF), also known as a rookie firefighter, a candidate firefighter, or probie, for short, is any firefighter in their first 6–18 months of service in a particular fire department. The title of probationary firefighter is generally the lowest rank in a fire department's rank structure.

The primary responsibility of a probationary or rookie firefighter is to learn how to be a firefighter, and they are both mentored and closely inspected by other senior firefighters and the officers. Probationary firefighters can be full operating firefighters, responding to calls and entering buildings, as is the often case in paid departments. Alternatively, they can be firefighters who do not perform interior operations, as is the case with most volunteer departments. In fact, PFFs are often given the menial jobs that few want to do, such as station cleanup, salvage operations, and fetching equipment. The term PFF can also be used to refer to the people in probationary firefighters school, also known as the "Fire Academy" in the New York City Fire Department.
