= Alberto Frezza =

Italian–American actor (born 1989)

- Born: May 23, 1989 (age 37); Milan, Lombardy, Italy
- Education: New York Film Academy
- Occupations: Actor; director
- Years active: 2008–present
- Height: 6 ft 1 in (185 cm)

Alberto Frezza (Italian: [alˈbɛrto ˈfrettsa]; born May 23, 1989) is an Italian-American actor and director.

== Early life and education ==
Alberto Frezza was born in Milan, Italy, and raised in Addis Ababa, Ethiopia. At 15, he returned to Italy to attend high school. He graduated from the Acting for Film program at the New York Film Academy.

== Career ==
In 2008, he made his acting debut in the short film Pills. In 2011, he appeared in the fifth episode of Charlie's Angels, as Wyatt Rice. In 2016, he appeared as Deputy Garrett Sykes in the Freeform drama series Dead of Summer. In 2017, Frezza was cast as a main character in the Grey's Anatomy spin-off television series Station 19. He also appeared in The Flight Attendant as Enrico.

== Personal life ==
Frezza speaks Amharic, Italian and English, and has two older sisters. In February 2021, Frezza revealed that he had been diagnosed with cancer. He underwent chemotherapy at the National Tumor Institute in Milan and has since fully recovered. He is a supporter of the Italian football team Juventus.

== Filmography ==
=== Film ===
Year	Title	Role	Notes
2008	Pills	Tom	Short
2010	Tell My Heart Now	Brett Sutton	Short
2011	1313: Giant Killer Bees!	Randy	Video
2012	Battle Force	Antonino	
2012	Angel Falls in Love	Max	
2014	Born to Race: Fast Track	Paulo Lauricello	Video
2017	Excuse	Alex	Short
2017	Shotgun Diaries	N/A	Short, writer and director
2021	A Godwink Christmas: Miracle of Love	Eric	TV movie
2023	Daedalus	Jovan	Short
2025	The Panic	Gianni Innocenti	
2026	Tiramisu	Marco	Short

=== Television ===
Year	Title	Role	Notes
2011	Charlie's Angels	Wyatt Rice	Episode: "Angels in Paradise"
2012	Touch	Paolo	Episode: "Noosphere Rising"
2016	Dead of Summer	Deputy Garrett "Townie" Sykes	Main Cast
2017	No, That's Okay. I'm Good.	Alberto	Episode: "Alberto Frezza & Matthew Scott Montgomery"
2017	Criminal Minds	William Lynch	Episode: "To a Better Place"
2018–2020	Station 19	Ryan Tanner	Main role (season 1-2); Recurring role (season 3)
2020	The Flight Attendant	Enrico	Recurring role (season 1)
2022	CSI: Vegas	Albert Santoni	Episode: "There's the Rub"
2023	Shining Vale	Ennio	Recurring role (Season 2)
2024	Fire Country	Andy Kubiak	Episode: “Alert the Sheriff”
2024	Based on a True Story	Jean-Michel	Episode: "Control F for Murder"
2025	Law & Order: Organized Crime	Roman Spezzano	Guest star, 3 episodes

=== Video Game ===
Year	Title	Role
2025	Mafia: The Old Country	Gianluca “Luca” Trapani

=== Audiobooks ===
Year	Title	Author	Role	Ref.
2026	Legacy of Deception	Dani Ryan	Marco DeLuca	
