= Rob Heaps =

British actor

Rob Heaps is a British actor, known for co-starring as Ezra Bloom in the Bravo television series Imposters. He grew up in York, England. He went to drama school in St. Petersburg, Russia, and the London Academy of Music and Dramatic Art.

== Filmography ==
Year	Title	Role	Notes
2011	Law & Order: UK	Clive Cooke	Episode: "Dawn Till Dusk"
2014	Frankenstein and the Vampyre: A Dark and Stormy Night	Lord Byron	Television film
2015	Life in Squares	Thoby Stephen	Miniseries; episode 1
2015	Doctors	Steve Campbell	Episode: "Someone Like You"
2015	And Then There Were None	Hugo	Miniseries; 2 episodes
2016	Home Fires	AC Tom Halliwell	6 episodes
2017–2018	Imposters	Ezra Bloom	Main role
2018	Death in Paradise	Stephen Marston	Episode: "Murder from Above"
2019	Queens of Mystery	Ian Winterfield	Episode: "Smoke and Mirrors"
2019	Liberté: A Call to Spy	Paul	Feature film
2019–2020	Dare Me	Matt French	Main role
2020–2021	Good Girls	Dr. Josh Cohen	11 episodes
2022	Partner Track	Nick Laren	Main role
2022–2023	Station 19	Eli Stern	Numerous episodes
2025	The Night Agent	Tomas	Season 2
2025	The Pitt	Chad Ashcroft	5 episodes
