= Zoanne Clack =

American television producer

Zoanne Clack (born July 14, 1968), also known as Zoanne Arnette, is an American television producer, writer, story editor, actress, and medical doctor/consultant. Clack's most notable work has been on the medical drama series Grey's Anatomy, in which she has served as executive story editor for twenty-three episodes, producer for nineteen episodes and writer for fifteen episodes. She has also served as an extra for the show. Her other work includes medical supervisor on ER, writer on Presidio Med and minor acting roles in The District and Philly.

== Background ==
Born in San Joaquin, California, she attended Northwestern University majoring in communication studies with a concentration in neurobiology. She attended medical school at UT Southwestern before doing her residency in Emergency Medicine at Emory University. She has a Masters of Public Health (MPH) in Behavioral Sciences and spent one year working with the Centers for Disease Control (CDC) in international emergency medicine. In her time with the CDC, she helped develop an emergency medicine program in response to the bombing of the American Embassy in Dar es Salaam, Tanzania, and played a part in expanding emergency medicine to the Pacific island of Palau. She then decided to pursue her creative interests. She moved to Los Angeles and quickly landed the job of staff writer on Presidio Med.

== Writer's Guild ==
In 2016, Clack was elected to be a board member of the WGA West. In 2019, Clack was on the negotiating committee for the WGA in their attempt to secure a better deal with the ATA regarding the practice of packaging. Clack joined other WGA members in April in firing her agents after the two parties were unable to agree on a new "Code of Conduct" deal.
