= Grey Damon =

American actor

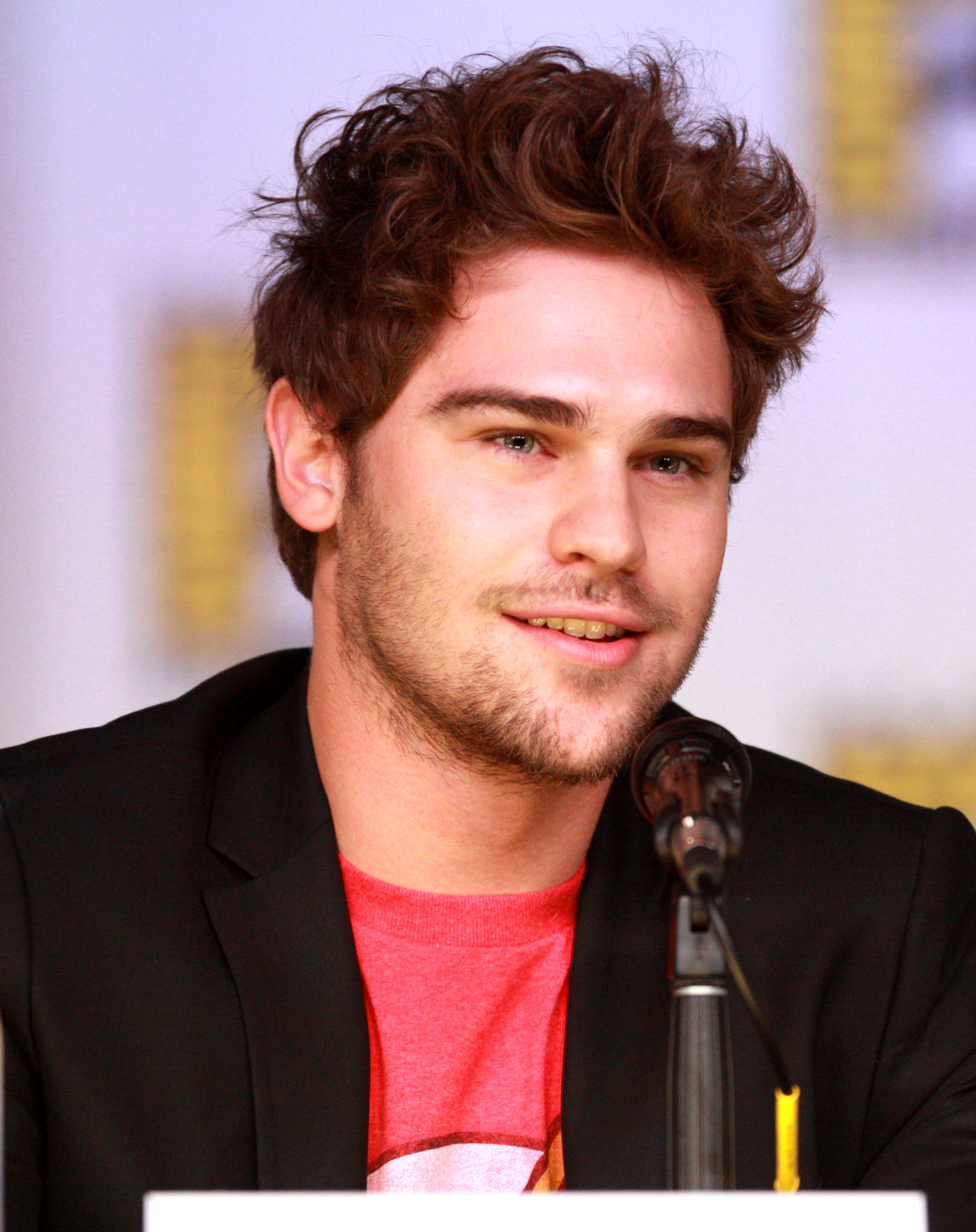
- Damon at San Diego Comic-Con in July 2013
- Born: September 24, 1987 (age 39); Bloomington, Indiana, U.S.
- Occupation: Actor
- Years active: 2009–present

Grey Damon (born September 24, 1987) is an American actor, known for his roles in Friday Night Lights, The Nine Lives of Chloe King and Station 19. He resides in Los Angeles. Beginning with its premiere in May 2015, Damon co-starred with David Duchovny on the NBC series Aquarius.

== Early life ==
Damon was born in Bloomington, Indiana. When he was young, he was raised in Boulder, Colorado. He discovered his passion for acting at the Denver Center for the Performing Arts when he landed his first professional job in a production of A Christmas Carol.

== Career ==
Damon made his acting debut in the February 3, 2009 episode of The CW's 90210, before getting minor roles in other television series such as Greek and 10 Things I Hate About You, and a recurring role in True Blood. In 2010, he landed a regular role as Hastings Ruckle in the final season of Friday Night Lights. The following year, he starred as Brian in The Nine Lives of Chloe King, which was cancelled after one season, and in 2012, he appeared in a recurring role in The Secret Circle. Damon had a recurring role as Archie in Freeform's Twisted.

Damon played the main love interest of Destinee & Paris in their 2011 music video for "True Love". On February 25, 2013, he was cast as Grayson in The CW's drama series Star-Crossed (originally titled Oxygen). In early August 2013, it was reported that Damon would join the cast for American Horror Story: Coven. In 2016, Damon was announced as Mirror Master for The Flash season 3. He was later cast in the spinoff of Grey's Anatomy called Station 19 as Jack Gibson.

== Filmography ==
=== Film ===
Year	Title	Role	Notes
2010	The Devil Within	John	
2013	Percy Jackson: Sea of Monsters	Chris Rodriguez	
2013	Oldboy	Young Joe Doucett	
2017	Sex Guaranteed	Kevin	
2018	The Possession of Hannah Grace	Andrew Kurtz	

=== Television ===
Year	Title	Role	Notes
2009	90210	Waiter	Episode: "Help Me, Rhonda"
2009	Lincoln Heights	Serge	Episode: "With You I Will Leave"
2010	Greek	Hunter	Episode: "The Tortoise and the Hair"
2010	10 Things I Hate About You	Trey	Episode: "Meat Is Murder"
2010	True Blood	Kitch Maynard	3 episodes
2010	The Whole Truth	Todd Engler	Episode: "Pilot"
2010–2011	Friday Night Lights	Hastings Ruckle	13 episodes
2011	The Nine Lives of Chloe King	Brian Rezza	9 episodes
2012	The Secret Circle	Lee LaBeque	6 episodes
2013–2014	Twisted	Archie Yates	11 episodes
2013	American Horror Story: Coven	Archie Brener	Episode: "Bitchcraft"
2014	Star-Crossed	Grayson Montrose	13 episodes
2015–2016	Aquarius	Brian Shafe	26 episodes
2016–2017	The Flash	Sam Scudder / Mirror Master	2 episodes
2017	The Magicians	Dryad	Episode: "Word as Bond"
2018–2024	Station 19	Jack Gibson	Main role; 100 episodes
2019–2021	Grey's Anatomy	Jack Gibson	Guest role; 3 episodes

=== Music videos ===
Year	Title	Role	Artist	Ref.
2011	"True Love"	Love Interest	Destinee & Paris	
