= Jay Hayden =

American actor

- Born: Jonathan Hayden; Northfield, Vermont, U.S.
- Education: University of Vermont
- Occupation: Actor
- Years active: 2007–present
- Spouse: Nikki Danielle Moore (m. 2005; div. 2020)
- Children: 2

Jonathan Hayden is an American actor. He is best known for his work in the ABC comedy-drama series The Catch (2016–17) and the Grey's Anatomy spinoff Station 19, both produced by Shondaland. He also has a recurring role in Crazy Ex-Girlfriend.

== Early life and Education ==
Hayden was born in Northfield, Vermont, and is of half-Irish and half-Korean descent. He won a soccer scholarship to the University of Vermont, where he was an English major but realized that acting was his primary interest; he moved to Los Angeles after graduation to pursue an acting career.

== Career ==
In film, Hayden had a major role in The House Bunny (2008) and the lead role in the 2011 horror film State of Emergency. He has since appeared in Wild Oats and the sports comedy Undrafted (both 2016).

On TV, he starred in the Hulu comedy mockumentary series Battleground in 2012. He had a regular role on The Catch, and recurring roles on Crazy Ex-Girlfriend and SEAL Team. He was a series regular in the Grey's Anatomy spinoff Station 19 from 2018 to 2024.

His TV commercial appearances include the Amazon Kindle Mayday ads.

In September 2024, Deadline announced Hayden will play Agent Tyler Booth in FBI: International.

== Other work ==
Hayden is co-owner of David Vincent, a construction company.

== Personal life ==
Hayden married actress Nikki Danielle Moore in June 2005; they were divorced in 2021. They have a son and a daughter.

== Filmography ==
=== Film ===
Year	Film	Role	Notes
2008	Spring Break Massacre	Rob	
2008	The Agent	Paul Goodman	Short film
2008	The House Bunny	Kip	
2009	New Hope Manor	Marty	
2011	Sweet Illusions	Max	Short film
2011	A Warrior's Heart	J.P. Jones	
2011	State of Emergency	Jim	
2012	Relativity	Carl	
2015	Testing	Eddie	Short film
2016	It's Us	Nelson	
2016	Blake Chandler: Psychic Investigator	Blake Chandler	Short film
2016	Monolith	Roy Lacombe	
2016	Undrafted	Vinnie	
2016	Wild Oats	Chip	
2017	Playing It Straight	Kevin	Short film
2018	001LithiumX	State Clerk	

=== Television ===
Year	Title	Role	Notes
2007	How I Met Your Mother	Pool Player	Episode: "Monday Night Football"
2008	The Suite Life on Deck	Ted	Episode: "Broke N Yo-Yo"
2012	Battleground	Chris 'Tak' Davis	Series regular, 13 episodes
2012	The Glades	Jay Nelson	Episode: "Poseidon Adventure"
2012–2013	Criminal Minds	Bobby Putnam	2 episodes
2014	Mixology	Dr. Eli Gold	Episode: "Bruce & Maya"
2015	Stalker	Clay Adams	Episode: "Love Hurts"
2016–2017	The Catch	Danny Yoon	Series regular, 20 episodes
2017	One Day at a Time	Ben	2 episodes
2017	SEAL Team	Brian Armstrong	4 episodes
2017–2018	Crazy Ex-Girlfriend	Dr. Daniel Shin	4 episodes
2018–2024	Station 19	Travis Montgomery	Main role; 103 episodes
2020–2022	Grey's Anatomy	Travis Montgomery	Guest role; 4 episodes
2024–2025	FBI: International	Agent Tyler Booth	Recurring role (Season 4)
2026-	Fire Country	Mason Ellis	Season 5
