= Barrett Doss =

American actress and singer

- Born: March 20 1989 (age 37); Minneapolis, Minnesota, US
- Occupation: Actress
- Years active: 2007–present
- Spouse: Austin Durant

Barrett Doss is an American actress and singer. She is known for her role as Victoria Hughes in the ABC action drama series Station 19.

== Life and career ==
Doss was born in Minneapolis, Minnesota on March 20, 1989. Doss's parents divorced when she was a child, and she lived with her mother, Kelly Skalicky, who later married her partner, Veronica, who shared parenting responsibilities. Her family first lived in Albuquerque, New Mexico, for two years, and later she spent most of her childhood in Chicago, and then moved to New York City. She graduated from the Professional Children's School in Manhattan. Doss attended New York University's Gallatin School of Individualized Study. In New York, she began performing on off-Broadway stage, and later on regional stage. In 2013, she made her television debut, appearing in an episode of NBC comedy series 30 Rock. She has appeared in series including Person of Interest, Bull and Girls. In 2014, She made her Broadway debut in the comedic play You Can't Take It with You appearing opposite James Earl Jones and Rose Byrne.

In 2017, Doss starred as Rita Hanson, a female lead, in the Broadway musical comedy Groundhog Day opposite Andy Karl. She received a 2017 Theatre World Award for an Outstanding Broadway Debut Performance. Later that year, she was cast in a recurring role on the Netflix superhero series Iron Fist and has made her film debut appearing in a supporting role in the biographical drama Marshall starring Chadwick Boseman. Later in 2017, she was cast in a series regular role on the ABC action drama series Station 19, spin-off to Grey's Anatomy. The series debuted in 2018. In 2019, Doss also began appearing on a recurring basis on the sixteenth season of Grey's Anatomy. Doss was cast in the 2026 Netflix series Little House on the Prairie.

== Filmography ==
Year	Title	Role	Notes
2013	30 Rock	Eliza Lemon	Episode: "Hogcock!/Last Lunch"
2014	Person of Interest	Trainee	Episode: "Last Call"
2016	The Family	Astra	Episode: "I Win"
2016	Bull	Kerry Ketchum	Episode: "Callisto"
2017	Girls	Zeva Carondelet	Episode: "Hostage Situation"
2017	Iron Fist	Megan	Recurring role, 7 episodes
2017	Time After Time	Serena	Episode: "Suitcases of Memories"
2017	Marshall	Bertha Lancaster	
2018–2024	Station 19	Victoria "Vic" Hughes	Main role; 105 episodes
2019–2023	Grey's Anatomy	Victoria "Vic" Hughes	Recurring role (season 16), Guest role (season 17-19); 10 episodes
2022	The Noel Diary	Rachel	Television film
2026	Little House on the Prairie	Emily Henderson	
