= Jaina Lee Ortiz =

American dancer (born 1986)

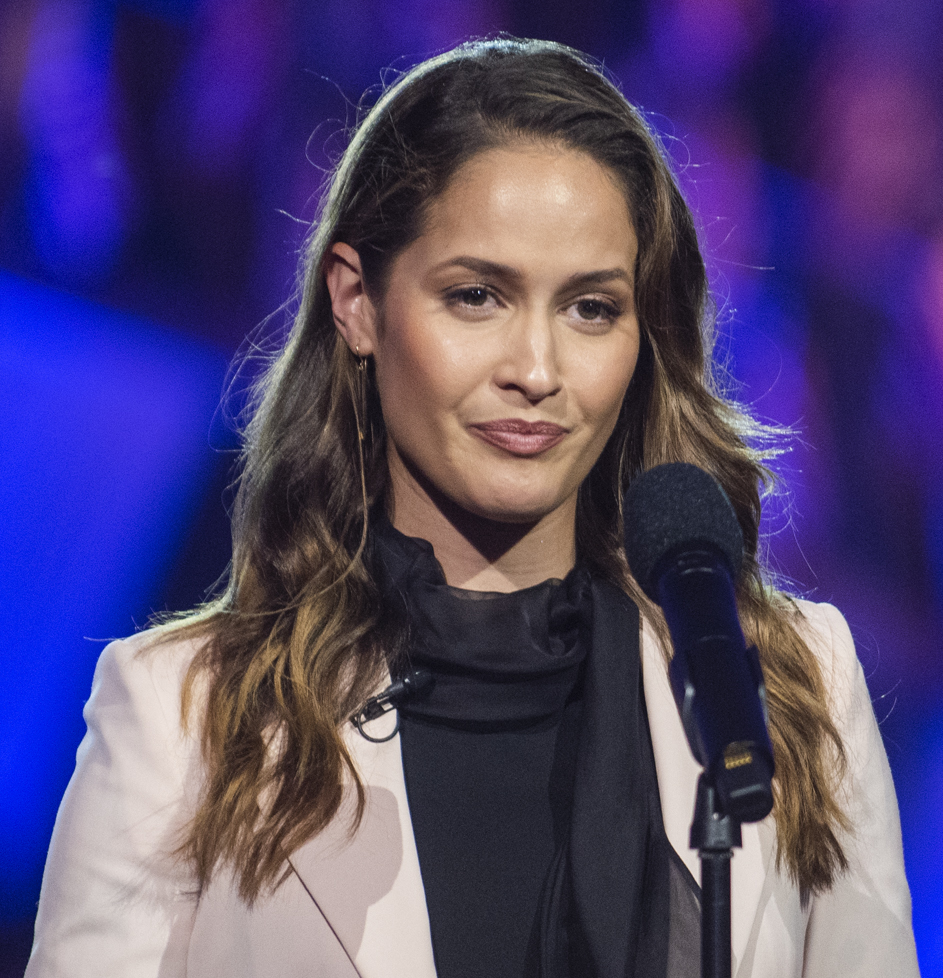
- Ortiz in 2019
- Born: Jessica Ortiz; November 20, 1986 (age 40); California, U.S.
- Occupations: Actress, dancer
- Years active: 2004–present

Jaina Lee Ortiz (born Jessica Ortiz; November 20, 1986) is an American actress and dancer. She is known for her starring role as Detective Annalise Villa on the Fox police drama Rosewood from 2015 to 2017. From 2018 to 2024, she starred as lead in the ABC drama series Station 19. Since 2026, she has starred as Emi Ochoa in the ABC drama series R.J. Decker.

== Early life and education ==
Ortiz was born November 20, 1986 in California and raised in The Bronx, New York. Ortiz's father, Joe Ortiz, is Puerto Rican and a retired NYPD first grade detective. She began her dance training at the age of nine by taking salsa/mambo classes; and, at the age of 15, she began teaching. By the next year, Ortiz was traveling internationally as a professional instructor and performer.

Ortiz started acting by appearing in student films. She studied for two years at Maggie Flanigan Studios, where she learned the Meisner technique.

== Career ==
In 2009, Ortiz auditioned and was cast on the second season of VH1's reality show Scream Queens, where she and nine other aspiring actresses competed in challenges based on acting for the opportunity to win the prize of a role in Saw 3D. The show premiered on August 2, 2010 and on the season finale, Ortiz was named first runner-up.

In 2012, Ortiz was in a photo used in the Modern Family episode Yard Sale where she was beauty pageant contestant Miss Galapa.

In 2013, Ortiz landed the role as a series regular in The After, produced by The X-Files creator, Chris Carter. The pilot, which began airing via Amazon Video in February 2014, received positive feedback and was ordered to series. However, on January 5, 2015, Amazon Studios canceled the show. Two months later, Ortiz was cast as the female lead in Rosewood on Fox. Rosewood ran for two seasons. In 2017, she had a recurring role during the second season of USA Network drama series, Shooter. Ortiz appeared in the comedy film Girls Trip, playing herself.

In 2017, Ortiz was cast in a leading role on the spin-off to ABC's longest-running drama series Grey's Anatomy, titled Station 19. In 2023, Ortiz starred in the thriller film Righteous Thieves and in the historical drama film The Long Game. She plays Emilia "Emi" Ochoa in the series R.J. Decker, which premiered March 3, 2026.

== Filmography ==
Key
†	Denotes films that have not yet been released

=== Film ===
Year	Film	Role.	
2004	Sad Spanish Song	Spanish Rice	
2008	High Voltage	Dancer	Short film
2012	Misfire	I.C.	
2013	Laid Out	Daniela	Short film
2017	Girls Trip	Herself	
2023	Righteous Thieves	Lucille	
2023	The Long Game	Lucy Pena	
2025	The Vortex	Ginny	
2026	Ghost Soldier	Sophia Hernandez	

=== Television ===
Year	Title	Role	Notes
2010	Scream Queens	Herself	Contestant, finalist (season 2); credited as Jessica Ortiz
2012	The Shop	Petrona	Web series, main cast
2012	Modern Family	photo of Pageant Contestant	Episode: "Yard Sale"
2014	The After	Officer Marly Muñoz	Premise pilot, did not go to series
2015–2017	Rosewood	Detective Annalise Villa	Main cast Nominated — Imagen Award for Best Actress – Television
2017	Shooter	Angela Tio	Recurring role (season 2)
2018–2022	Grey's Anatomy	Captain Andrea "Andy" Herrera	Episode: "You Really Got a Hold on Me" (backdoor pilot, season 14); 4 crossover episodes (seasons 15, 18–19)
2018–2024	Station 19	Captain Andrea "Andy" Herrera	Main cast; 105 episodes
2026–present	R.J. Decker	Emilia "Emi" Ochoa	Main cast; 16 episodes
