= Mount Sinai Hospital (Chicago) =

Coordinates: 41°51′39.9″N 87°41′40.2″W

- Sinai Chicago

Geography
- Location: Chicago, West Side, Illinois, United States

Organization
- Type: Teaching, Not-for-Profit, Major Urban Medical Center
- Affiliated university: Rosalind Franklin University of Medicine and Science, Ross University School of Medicine, University of Illinois at Chicago

Services
- Emergency department: Level I trauma center (adult), Chest Pain Center, Stroke Center, Comprehensive Emergency Services
- Beds: 319

History
- Founded: 1912 (reopened under current name in 1919)

Links
- Website: http://www.sinaichicago.org
- Lists: Hospitals in Illinois

Mount Sinai Hospital, formerly at times known as Mount Sinai Medical Center, is a 319-bed major urban hospital in Chicago, Illinois, with its main campus located adjacent to Douglass Park at 15th Street and California Avenue on the city's West Side. The hospital was established in 1912 under the name Maimonides Hospital, with a mission of serving poor immigrants from Europe while providing training to Jewish physicians, primarily of Eastern European descent. After a period of financial difficulty, it closed in 1918, and was reopened as "Mount Sinai Hospital" in 1919, with 60 beds and continuing its original mission.

== History ==
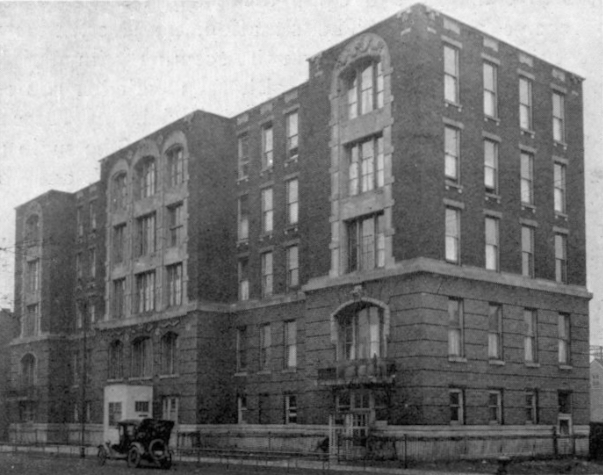
Mount Sinai Hospital, 1519 South California Ave. in 1922

The second Jewish hospital to be established in the city, Mount Sinai Hospital differed from Michael Reese Hospital, which had been established in 1881 on Chicago's South Side primarily by German Jews, whereas Mount Sinai was founded by Eastern European Jews. Unlike other hospitals, Mount Sinai had a kosher kitchen.

Morris Kurtzon sought to provide the West Side community in Chicago with a suitable hospital, one where Jewish doctors could practice without facing exclusion from hospital staff by anti-Semitism. Purchasing with his own money the bankrupt Maimonides Hospital, Kurtzon reorganized it under the name Mount Sinai Hospital Association. He refused an attractive offer to sell the property to the University of Illinois, preferring to donate it for the benefit of the entire community. The community responded to this gesture with a strenuous effort to build financial support for the new hospital. Although women had not traditionally been welcome to participate in many communal activities, the early history of Mount Sinai included a strong presence of women among its supporters. Kurtzon devoted a good deal of his time to planning and designing the new facility. The final hospital plans were drawn up by the Chicago architectural firm of Schmidt, Garden and Erikson. Garcy Corporation of Piedmont, Alabama, designed custom equipment for the new hospital, much of it made of stainless steel.

Ruth Rothstein, who served as the president of the hospital from the 1970s to the 1990s, resisted calls to move Mount Sinai to the suburbs.

== Patient services ==
Mount Sinai Medical Center is a non-profit institution, which provides charity care to 59% of its patients and is a teaching hospital affiliated primarily with Ross University School of Medicine, but also Rosalind Franklin University of Medicine and Science and the University of Illinois at Chicago. The hospital is an adult Level 1 trauma center, chest pain center, and stroke center. Due to relatively low utilization and the availability of pediatric inpatient facilities at other institutions nearby, Mount Sinai in 2017 discontinued offering pediatric trauma care and hospitalization for children under age 16. While operating at a financial loss in an aging facility, even in its current state the hospital provides medical care to a vital part of the community.

== Sinai Chicago hospital system ==
As of 2022, Mount Sinai Hospital is operated by the Sinai Chicago system, which also includes Holy Cross Hospital at 68th Street & California Avenue, Schwab Rehabilitation Hospital, and Sinai Children's Hospital, a network of community clinic locations, as well as the Sinai Community Institute and the Sinai Urban Health Institute. Sinai Children's includes a Level 3 neonatal intensive care unit and performs outpatient surgery for children.

Effective June 13, 2022, Sinai Chicago hired Ngozi Ezike, former director of the Illinois Department of Public Health, as president and CEO, taking the place of Karen Teitelbaum who was retiring after 15 years.

=== Residency training programs ===
Sinai Chicago has five ACGME (Accreditation Council for Graduate Medical Education) accredited residency training programs in the fields of General Surgery, Internal Medicine, Family Medicine, Physical Medicine and Rehabilitation, and Obstetrics and Gynecology. It has trained numerous physicians who went successfully into primary care as well as into competitive subspecialty fellowships. Mount Sinai also has its own Adult Cardiology and Interventional Adult Cardiology fellowship programs.
