= Grey's Anatomy season 19 =

Grey's Anatomy
- Season 19
- Promotional poster for the nineteenth season of Grey's Anatomy
- Showrunner: Krista Vernoff
- Starring: Ellen Pompeo; Chandra Wilson; James Pickens Jr.; Kevin McKidd; Caterina Scorsone; Camilla Luddington; Kelly McCreary; Kim Raver; Jake Borelli; Chris Carmack; Anthony Hill; Alexis Floyd; Harry Shum Jr.; Adelaide Kane; Midori Francis; Niko Terho; Scott Speedman
- No. of episodes: 20

Release
- Original network: ABC
- Original release: October 6, 2022 – May 18, 2023

Season chronology
- ← Previous; Season 18 Next → Season 20

The nineteenth season of the American medical drama television series Grey's Anatomy was announced on January 10, 2022, by the American Broadcasting Company (ABC). It premiered on October 6, 2022, for the 2022–23 broadcast television season. Krista Vernoff returned for the season as executive producer and showrunner alongside her production company Trip the Light Productions. ABC Signature and Shondaland also co-produce the series.

The season sees Ellen Pompeo, who portrays Meredith Grey, reduce her involvement in the series. Richard Flood does not return from the previous season. Scott Speedman is only credited for the episodes that he is in. Kate Walsh also appears in a recurring capacity. Jesse Williams and Greg Germann also return as guest stars. This is the first season to feature Alexis Floyd, Harry Shum Jr., Adelaide Kane, Midori Francis, and Niko Terho as series regulars. On March 24, 2023, ABC renewed the series for a twentieth season.

The website Screen Rant ranked the season #17 on their 2023 ranking of the 19 Grey's Anatomy seasons.

== Episodes ==
No. overall	No. in season	Title	Directed by	Written by	Original release date	U.S. viewers (millions)
401	1	"Everything Has Changed"	Debbie Allen	Krista Vernoff	October 6, 2022	3.80
Six months have passed, and a lot has changed around Grey Sloan. Following Bailey's resignation in the Season 18 finale, Meredith assumes the role of Interim Chief of Surgery; under her tenure, she has revived the residency program, recruiting surgical residents who either were not good enough to get into other programs or kicked out of their previous ones. The bottom-of-the-barrel residents are immediately put to the test when a tornado-based bus accident sends dozens of patients to the hospital. When one of the victims succumbs to his injuries, an opportunity for a triple-organ transplant presents itself. Residents Simone Griffith, Lucas Adams, and Benson Kwan jump at the chance to get in on the procedure. The rare surgery also brings Nick to the hospital, whom Meredith hasn't seen since their breakup. Meredith appoints him as the point person for the transplant while she deals with her duties as Chief. The transplant hits a snag when Lucas accidentally informs the wrong parent about the organ donation, forcing him, Simone, and Benson to scramble for permission. Elsewhere, Levi struggles to tell Jo that he doesn't want to work in the OB/GYN department, and Link realizes that he has slept with one of the residents, Jules Millin. Amelia gets off to a rocky start with the fifth resident, Mika Yasuda. After the successful transplant surgery, Meredith offers Nick a full-time position as Residency Director. Owen did not go to jail and he and Teddy come back after having gotten all his criminal charges dropped.
402	2	"Wasn't Expecting That"	Pete Chatmon	Meg Marinis	October 13, 2022	3.27
All hands are on deck for Chase, a college student presenting with a host of mystery symptoms, including a full body rash, difficulty breathing, and bleeding from every orifice. While all the interns are put on the case to determine the source of Chase's symptoms, Jules and Simone are able to name the diagnosis before it's too late. Meanwhile, Mika is put on Teddy and Owen's service but spends the entire time watching them argue about Owen's need to be medically supervised because his license is suspended. Owen spends the entire day acting like a child and not taking responsibility for his actions. Meredith and Nick tiptoe around each other as Meredith grows increasingly annoyed at all the changes Nick is instituting as the new Residency Director without running them by her, though she eventually reveals that she is still in love with him. Maggie and Winston are also at odds with one another for the day, as Maggie's perfectionism is getting in the way of Winston's ability to do his job on his own. Outside of the hospital, Bailey and Jo catch up at the park with their kids, and Schmitt visits Helm at her new job as a bartender at Joe's.
403	3	"Let's Talk About Sex"	Kevin McKidd	Michelle Lirtzman	October 20, 2022	3.58
The interns are saddled with the responsibility of giving a sex-education class to a group of high school students when Addison stops by the hospital to handle all things sex and OB/GYN. While most of the students are initially far from interested until the doctors begin giving tips on how to have great sex, one young girl realizes she is pregnant and does not want to keep the baby, prompting Schmitt and Addison to help her receive a medical abortion. Another female student is also admitted to the hospital after she kneels over in pain during the class and is discovered to have an ovarian torsion, which Bailey, Jo, and Addison successfully operate on. Elsewhere, Nick spends the day with Zola, who is at the hospital due to frequent panic attacks at school. Kai, visiting from Minnesota, notices Zola's natural ability to perform extremely well on cognitive tests, which Nick suggests to Meredith may be the reason why Zola is having difficulty at school.
404	4	"Haunted"	Amyn Kaderali	Jamie Denbo	October 27, 2022	3.48
It's Halloween, and Nick and Meredith have something special planned: trauma training for the interns using fresh-tissue cadavers. As Owen and Winston oversee the training session, deep secrets about each intern rises to the surface, including that Jules' family has a history of run-ins with the law, that Benson never grew up with a dad, and that a video of Simone's violent reaction to being fired from her previous hospital due to racial discrimination is now being shared all over the internet. In the ER, Maggie treats two teenage boys who have sustained serious injuries after taking LSD and trying to fly off the roof of a house. Teddy and Link work together on a patient, and after Link reveals that he's in love with Jo, Teddy advises that Link not cross that boundary due to Teddy's negative experience marrying her own best friend. Winston reveals to Maggie that he is considering changing specialties, as he's finding it difficult to work under her, while Richard confronts Schmitt about over-working himself. Outside of the hospital, Nick and Meredith have a date night at a hotel but are interrupted when Zola has another panic attack at a sleepover.
405	5	"When I Get to the Border"	Jesse Williams	Julie Wong	November 3, 2022	3.13
Meredith and Zola arrive in Boston on the latest leg of their private school tour. Though Zola is wary about uprooting the family from Seattle, she visits a STEM school for gifted children while Meredith meets up with Jackson to discuss her growing desire to cure Alzheimer's. Jackson assures Meredith that there are unlimited resources for her here, should she decide to move and take a job at Jackson's hospital. At the end of the day, Zola reveals she loved the STEM school, which solidifies Meredith's decision to move. Also in Boston, Tom speaks to Catherine about her cancer, which is no longer in remission, as the tumor has started to grow again. Elsewhere, Addison and Bailey head to Pullman, Washington to volunteer at a family-planning clinic. While en-route, they pick up Susan, a pregnant woman whose ectopic pregnancy ruptures soon after. Due to heavy traffic, Addison and Bailey are unable to get Susan to the hospital, and she eventually bleeds out on the side of the road. Back in Seattle, the interns continue to believe that Lucas is sleeping with Amelia, especially after they see Lucas taking Scout to daycare. Wanting to fast-track his surgical career, Benson offers sexual favors to Amelia, prompting her to discover the rumor about her and Lucas. Amelia demands that Lucas tell the other interns about the true nature of their relationship, and even though Lucas begs her to let it go because he doesn't want to be accused of nepotism, Amelia gives him three days to tell the truth.
406	6	"Thunderstruck"	Michael Watkins	Jase Miles-Perez	November 10, 2022	3.72
A thunderstorm hits Seattle, sending several patients to Grey Sloan, including Jonathan, a TV reporter whose helicopter was struck by lightning. After watching Teddy save Jonathan's life, Owen suggests that she apply for the open Chief of Surgery position now that Meredith is leaving. Meanwhile, Meredith's announcement of her departure is shaking the hospital, especially the interns, who worry that their program won't survive without her. Nick assures them this is not the case, though he is not so sure about his relationship with Meredith. Maggie and Winston are also on unsteady ground, as Winston continues to pursue training for another specialty, much to Maggie's dismay. Elsewhere, Lucas and Simone get closer, culminating in a kiss, as do Benson and Jules; and Jo, Bailey, and Carina open up a new reproductive health care clinic. Just as Meredith prepares to wrap up her life in Seattle, she gets news that her house has been struck by lightning and is on fire. Note: This episode concludes a crossover event that begins on Station 19 season 6 episode 6.
407	7	"I'll Follow the Sun"	Debbie Allen	Krista Vernoff	February 23, 2023	3.60
On her last day, Meredith operates on a beloved patient, children's author Tessa Hobbs, with Nick. Despite their best efforts, Tessa dies on the table, which casts a shadow over Meredith's final hours. Maggie and Winston perform the world's first partial heart transplant on a baby named Arlo. Richard offers the Chief of Surgery position to Teddy Altman. Meredith, Maggie, and Amelia each separately give a key to the Grey house to interns Simone, Lucas, and Mika and they move into Meredith's house together.
408	8	"All Star"	Allison Liddi-Brown	Briana Belser	March 2, 2023	3.08
Link performs an ACL repair on a Quarterback nicknamed Tank, but after complications arise, he is unable to be resuscitated. Encouraged by Bailey, Teddy presents Richard with a list of steep demands, including a significant pay raise, an administrative assistant, and research funds. Simone and Lucas share a passionate kiss in the elevator, but when they arrive at the intern house, they are shocked to find Simone's ex-fiancé, Trey, waiting with flowers. Jules and Jo treat a patient who is overwhelmed by a third pregnancy and a history of postpartum depression. They support her in obtaining an abortion.
409	9	"Love Don't Cost a Thing"	Kevin McKidd	Jess Righthand	March 9, 2023	3.18
Yasuda, Griffith, and Adams throw a house party, but Griffith and her ex-fiance Trey can barely stop arguing long enough to make an appearance. When Trey insists that the GSMH internship program - and its people - are beneath Griffith and her abilities, she storms upstairs. Adams follows her and tells her all the things he thinks are amazing about her, and they kiss. When Trey knocks on the closed bedroom door to tell Griffith how much he loves her, Adams tells Griffith that if she loves Trey, she needs to go fight for him. Trey re-proposes to Griffith, and she accepts, much to Adams' dismay. Yasuda and Helm get friendly, then dance it out with Adams to lift his spirits. Meanwhile Teddy and Owen host Bailey and Ben for dinner, where tempers run hot. Teddy, newly Chief of Surgery, is hoping to hire a new Chief of Trauma rather than hiring an Interim Chief of Trauma and giving Owen his job back when his license is reinstated. After telling the bickering couple that they need to figure out their issues before it hurts their children and the rest of the hospital, Bailey asks Ben why he seems resentful of her. Ben admits that he doesn't like that Bailey has gone back to work and that he worries all the time about raising Prue, given how much she has lost already. At the hospital, Kwan gets on Maggie's bad side when he suggests that a patient and her husband divorce in order to safeguard their finances and qualify for better insurance. The couple reluctantly agree, but not before recommitting to one another. When Maggie admonishes him again for his behavior, Kwan tells her that his mother ran up enormous medical bills - and so did he, to help provide for her. Maggie worries that her marriage is beyond repair. Link, still the least popular man in Seattle after Tank's death, helps a laboring mom find hope and deliver her baby.
410	10	"Sisters Are Doin' It for Themselves"	Linda Klein	Tameson Duffy	March 16, 2023	3.46
Catherine Fox returns to perform a specialized surgery on a patient with Peyronie’s disease, during which Blue faints. After the surgery, Richard notices Catherine is exhausted and using alternative pain management. She finally confesses the truth: her cancer is progressing. Amelia treats a patient named Barbara whose sisters are "gleefully" convinced she has brain cancer because of their family history. It turns out the tumor is benign, much to the sisters' odd disappointment. Owen undergoes a formal evaluation by Dr Patel to get his medical license back. After demonstrating quick thinking during an ER trauma case, he passes the appeal and is cleared to resume his post as Chief of Trauma. Simone is struggling with her feelings for Lucas while her fiancé Trey continues to plan their wedding.
411	11	"Training Day"	Kim Raver	Meg Marinis & Julie Wong	March 23, 2023	3.36
Addison returns to Grey Sloan to help Bailey, Jo, and Carina train a class of out-of-state OB/GYN in women's healthcare, specifically abortion care, which has been prohibited in their home states. Addison's work in Illinois has led to her being doxed, causing severe mental strain, and her presence amps up the usual protests outside to become violent. Benson is hit by a brick thrown through a window. Bailey delivers a pep talk to rally the team to deliver a baby together. Teddy steps up to handle the crisis and overflow of clinic patients with Richard's help. Meanwhile, Nick teaches an insecure Lucas as he keeps screwing up in front of Maggie, whose patient's single-lung transplant is derailed when the boyfriend/donor sustains thoracic injuries in a car accident. Winston pulls off a complex procedure to preserve the patient's lung, impressing Owen. Simone moves up her wedding date when the patient's story hits close to home.
412	12	"Pick Yourself Up"	Kevin McKidd	Scott D. Brown	March 30, 2023	3.70
Addison and Tia are hit by a hit and run. Addison only has a dislocated shoulder but Tia has serious injuries and her baby boy Connor is born prematurely via c-section. Both survive. Maggie's article about her partial heart transplant has been published but doesn't mention Winston by name, only that she had a team of assistants to support her. Winston is hurt and tells Maggie he thinks she doesn't respect him. Jules' elderly roommate Maxine is brought into the ER and it turns out she has gonorrhea. In the end, Addison is seen leaving in her mobile clinic to help more women receive their much needed health care.
413	13	"Cowgirls Don't Cry"	Chandra Wilson	Mark Driscoll	April 6, 2023	3.31
Maggie and Winston attend couples counseling but it's not going well. Simone is wrapped up in wedding planning, she is trying to find a maid of honor. She chooses Adams and he accepts. Altman is still trying to find her feet as chief. A rodeo rider who's been trampled by a bull is being admitted with a spinal injury. Link and Jo have a heart to heart. Schmitt is trying to show his nice side to the interns and buys them all a drink after work at Joe's.
414	14	"Shadow of Your Love"	Allison Liddi-Brown	Beto Skubs	April 13, 2023	3.15
415	15	"Mama Who Bore Me"	Linda Klein	Alyssa Margarite Jacobson	April 13, 2023	3.15
Maggie and Winston team up for one last high-stakes surgery on Nola, a patient with a massive tumor. After the surgery, Winston asks Maggie to stay in Seattle, but she insists on leaving for the research opportunity in Chicago. Winston remains in Seattle to focus on his own career as Chief of Cardio. Kai arrives in Seattle to tell Amelia that they have accepted a prestigious job in London. Amelia, already feeling abandoned by Maggie’s departure, takes the news hard. The harassment from anti-abortion activists worsens when Bailey receives a photo of her son, Tuck, at school on her phone. Realising the danger is real, Bailey agrees with Ben to change her phone number and move the family into a rental apartment for safety. Link plans a romantic dinner to confess his feelings for Jo. However, Jo calls him in tears from the hospital because she has been told that baby Luna has progressive hearing loss. Levi Schmitt organises a hospital bar mitzvah for his patient, Grayson, so the boy's great-grandfather can attend. This success prompts Richard to suggest that Schmitt pursue a paediatric fellowship. Yasuda struggles with exhaustion from working extra shifts at Joe’s Bar and misses out on a major surgery after oversleeping.
416	16	"Gunpowder and Lead"	Morenike Joela Evans	Michelle Lirtzman	April 20, 2023	3.35
417	17	"Come Fly with Me"	Amyn Kaderali	Kingsley Ume	May 4, 2023	3.10
418	18	"Ready to Run"	Allison Liddi-Brown	Julie Wong	May 11, 2023	2.99
Richard and Teddy announce that Nick, Winston and Maggie have been nominated for a Catherine Fox Award. Jules and Blue continue to butt heads over Maxine's care, whilst Lucas helps an artist decide on a risky procedure. Jo and Mika tend to Sam as Simone faces a life-changing decision, and Lucas discloses his ADHD diagnosis to her.
419	19	"Wedding Bell Blues"	Kevin McKidd	Krista Vernoff and Meg Marinis	May 18, 2023	3.02
420	20	"Happily Ever After?"	Debbie Allen	Meg Marinis	May 18, 2023	3.02

== Cast and characters ==
=== Main ===
- Ellen Pompeo as Dr. Meredith Grey
- Chandra Wilson as Dr. Miranda Bailey
- James Pickens Jr. as Dr. Richard Webber
- Kevin McKidd as Dr. Owen Hunt
- Caterina Scorsone as Dr. Amelia Shepherd
- Camilla Luddington as Dr. Jo Wilson
- Kelly McCreary as Dr. Maggie Pierce
- Kim Raver as Dr. Teddy Altman
- Jake Borelli as Dr. Levi Schmitt
- Chris Carmack as Dr. Atticus "Link" Lincoln
- Anthony Hill as Dr. Winston Ndugu
- Alexis Floyd as Dr. Simone Griffith
- Harry Shum Jr. as Dr. Benson "Blue" Kwan
- Adelaide Kane as Dr. Jules Millin
- Midori Francis as Dr. Mika Yasuda
- Niko Terho as Dr. Lucas Adams
- Scott Speedman as Dr. Nick Marsh

=== Recurring ===
- Kate Walsh as Dr. Addison Montgomery
- Jason George as Dr. Ben Warren
- Debbie Allen as Dr. Catherine Fox
- Aniela Gumbs as Zola Grey Shepherd
- Jaicy Elliot as Dr. Taryn Helm
- William Martinez as Trey Delgado
- Calvin Seabrooks as Carlos Garcia
- Stefania Spampinato as Dr. Carina DeLuca
- E.R. Fightmaster as Dr. Kai Bartley
- Samuel Page as Sam Sutton
- Karen Obilom as Tobey Barrett
- Juliet Mills as Maxine Anderson

=== Notable guests ===
- Jesse Williams as Dr. Jackson Avery
- Greg Germann as Dr. Tom Koracick
- Marla Gibbs as Joyce Ward
- Nolan Gould as Chase Sams
- Artemis Pebdani as Sharon Peters
- Jaina Lee Ortiz as Andrea "Andy" Herrera
- Boris Kodjoe as Robert Sullivan
- Carlos Miranda as Theo Ruiz
- Danielle Savre as Maya Bishop
- Barrett Doss as Victoria “Vic” Hughes
- Johanna Curé as Natalia Asaki
- Rick Kumazawa as Elliot Asaki
- Jessika Van as Marni Young
- Kate Burton as Ellis Grey
- LaTanya Richardson Jackson as Diane Pierce

== Production ==
=== Development ===
Krista Vernoff, who serves as the showrunner and an executive producer of Grey's Anatomy and spin-off Station 19 signed a two-year deal with ABC in 2021 to remain on both series through a potential nineteenth season. The deal also keeps Trip the Light Productions, Vernoff's production company, attached to the series. In December 2021 it was reported that negotiations for a renewal had begun between series star Ellen Pompeo, and production companies ABC Signature and Shondaland, the latter of which is run by series creator Shonda Rhimes. Network executives at ABC were interested in a nineteenth season due to its status as the longest-running primetime medical drama, high viewing figures, and profit generation. The season was officially renewed on January 10, 2022. As part of the renewal Pompeo received a promotion to executive producer, only previously being a co-executive producer. Betsy Beers, Debbie Allen, Meg Marinis and Mark Gordon also returned to executive produce. Zoanne Clack remained as the series' medical advisor and an executive producer, despite being hired as co-showrunner and executive producer on Station 19 alongside Vernoff.

=== Casting ===
Kim Raver, Camilla Luddington, and Kevin McKidd each signed a three-year contract in July 2020 keeping them attached to the series through a potential nineteenth season to portray Dr. Teddy Altman, Dr. Jo Wilson, and Dr. Owen Hunt, respectively. When the series was announced it was also reported that Pompeo signed a one-year deal to return as Dr. Meredith Grey. Chandra Wilson who portrays Dr. Miranda Bailey and James Pickens Jr. who portrays Dr. Richard Webber also signed multi-year contracts to continue on the series. Caterina Scorsone confirmed in a tweet that she would be returning for the season as Dr. Amelia Shepherd, stating that she was memorizing lines for the first episode. On August 3, 2022, it was announced that Pompeo would be scaling back her work on the series, only appearing in a "limited capacity" in the first 7 episodes, as well as the season finale. Pompeo will only star in eight of the 20–23 episodes, but will continue to narrate most other episodes of the seasons. The reduction in involvement on the series comes from Pompeo's casting in Good American Family, a Hulu series based on Natalia Grace and her adoption by U.S. parents, on which she will also be an executive producer. The role is the first new fictional character for Pompeo since her casting as Grey in 2005.

In July 2022, five new actors were added to the main cast to portray new surgical residents. Alexis Floyd, who previously starred Inventing Anna, another Shondaland series; was the first of the five to be announced, and is set to play Simone Griffin. The character "never wanted to work at Grey Sloan because of a painful personal history with the hospital." Niko Terho was the next cast addition to be announced and will play Lucas Adams, a surgeon aiming to prove himself. Terho also starred in Inventing Anna and performed alongside Borelli in The Thing About Harry. Mika Yasuda, a middle child used to being overlooked, will be portrayed by Midori Francis. Adelaide Kane joined the cast as Jules Millin, who's "not afraid to break the rules to save a life." Harry Shum Jr. was the last of five to be announced and is expected to portray Daniel “Blue” Kwan. Kwan is reportedly "generous by nature but competitive to a fault." When a promo trailer was released on September 6, 2022, it was revealed that the last name of Floyd's character was changed to Griffith and the first name of Shum's character had been changed to Benson.

ABC later confirmed that Kelly McCreary, Anthony Hill, Chris Carmack, and Jake Borelli would also be returning to the main cast. Of this group, only McCreary's contract had expired, but was renewed. Scott Speedman, who joined as a series regular in the previous season with a one-year contract, was set to be demoted to the recurring cast, but continued to receive main billing. Richard Flood is the only member of the ensemble cast to not return after departing in the latter half of the eighteenth season. On September 7, 2022, it was revealed that Kate Walsh would reprise her role as Dr. Addison Montgomery in a recurring role. On October 17, 2022, it was announced that Jesse Williams would return as a director, and guest star in the fifth episode of the nineteenth season.

On March 17, 2023, it was reported that Kelly McCreary, who joined the series in the tenth series as Dr. Maggie Pierce, would be departing as a series regular following the fifteenth episode of the season, "Mama Who Bore Me", which aired on April 13, 2023. It was also announced she would be appearing in the final episode of the season, similar to Pompeo.

== Release ==
When ABC revealed its fall schedule for the 2022–23 broadcast television season, it was reported that the season would hold its previous timeslot of Thursdays at 9:00 pm Eastern Time (ET), serving as a lead-out of Station 19. The season premiere was later scheduled for October 6, 2022.

== Reception ==
=== Ratings ===
Viewership and ratings per episode of Grey's Anatomy season 19
No.	Title	Air date	Timeslot (ET)	Rating (18–49)	Viewers (millions)	DVR (18–49)	DVR viewers (millions)	Total (18–49)	Total viewers (millions)
1	"Everything Has Changed"	October 6, 2022	Thursday; 9:00 p.m.	0.6	3.80	0.4	2.26	1.0	6.06
2	"Wasn't Expecting That"	October 13, 2022	Thursday; 9:00 p.m.	0.5	3.27	0.4	1.86	0.9	5.14
3	"Let's Talk About Sex"	October 20, 2022	Thursday; 9:00 p.m.	0.5	3.59	0.5	1.85	0.9	5.44
4	"Haunted"	October 27, 2022	Thursday; 9:00 p.m.	0.5	3.48	0.4	1.89	0.9	5.37
5	"When I Get to the Border"	November 3, 2022	Thursday; 9:00 p.m.	0.4	3.13	0.5	1.98	0.9	5.11
6	"Thunderstruck"	November 10, 2022	Thursday; 9:00 p.m.	0.5	3.72	0.5	2.14	1.0	5.86
7	"I'll Follow the Sun"	February 23, 2023	Thursday; 9:00 p.m.	0.5	3.60	—N/a	—N/a	—N/a	—N/a
8	"All Star"	March 2, 2023	Thursday; 9:00 p.m.	0.4	3.08	—N/a	—N/a	—N/a	—N/a
9	"Love Don't Cost a Thing"	March 9, 2023	Thursday; 9:00 p.m.	0.4	3.18	—N/a	—N/a	—N/a	—N/a
10	"Sisters Are Doin' It for Themselves"	March 16, 2023	Thursday; 9:00 p.m.	0.4	3.46	—N/a	—N/a	—N/a	—N/a
11	"Training Day"	March 23, 2023	Thursday; 9:00 p.m.	0.4	3.36	—N/a	—N/a	—N/a	—N/a
12	"Pick Yourself Up"	March 30, 2023	Thursday; 9:00 p.m.	0.5	3.70	—N/a	—N/a	—N/a	—N/a
13	"Cowgirls Don't Cry"	April 6, 2023	Thursday; 9:00 p.m.	0.4	3.31	—N/a	—N/a	—N/a	—N/a
14	"Shadow of Your Love"	April 13, 2023	Thursday; 9:00 p.m.	0.4	3.15	—N/a	—N/a	—N/a	—N/a
15	"Mama Who Bore Me"	April 13, 2023	Thursday; 10:00 p.m.	0.4	3.15	—N/a	—N/a	—N/a	—N/a
16	"Gunpowder and Lead"	April 20, 2023	Thursday; 9:00 p.m.	0.4	3.35	—N/a	—N/a	—N/a	—N/a
17	"Come Fly With Me"	May 4, 2023	Thursday; 9:00 p.m.	0.4	3.10	—N/a	—N/a	—N/a	—N/a
18	"Ready to Run"	May 11, 2023	Thursday; 9:00 p.m.	0.4	2.99	—N/a	—N/a	—N/a	—N/a
19	"Wedding Bell Blues"	May 18, 2023	Thursday; 9:00 p.m.	0.4	3.02	—N/a	—N/a	—N/a	—N/a
20	"Happily Ever After"	May 18, 2023	Thursday; 10:00 p.m.	0.4	3.02	—N/a	—N/a	—N/a	—N/a
