= ICPM =

ICPM is an acronym that may refer to:

- Illinois College of Podiatric Medicine
