= When I Get to the Border =

When I Get to the Border may refer to:

- "When I Get to the Border", the 5th episode of Grey's Anatomy season 19
- "When I Get to the Border", a song from the 1974 album I Want to See the Bright Lights Tonight by Richard and Linda Thompson
