= Archana Chatterjee =

Indian epidemiologist

- Born: India
- Education: Armed Forces Medical College; University of Nebraska Medical Center
- Scientific career
- Fields: Pediatric infectious diseases, epidemiology
- Workplaces: Army Medical Corps; University of South Dakota; Creighton University; Rosalind Franklin University of Medicine and Science

Archana Chatterjee is an Indian pediatric infectious disease specialist, epidemiologist, and academic administrator serving as dean of the Chicago Medical School since 2020. She is vice president for medical affairs at the Rosalind Franklin University of Medicine and Science.

== Life ==
Chatterjee was born and raised in India. In 1983, she earned a Bachelor of Medicine, Bachelor of Surgery from the Armed Forces Medical College. From 1983 to 1984, she completed a rotating internship aboard the Indian Naval Hospital Ship, Asvini in Mumbai. From 1985 to 1988, was a medical officer in the Army Medical Corps. She primarily worked at Military Hospital Gaya attending to expectant mothers and children. She was honorably discharged as a captain. In 1989, she was a senior resident in the department of microbiology at Banaras Hindu University. In 1993, she received a Ph.D. in the medical sciences interdepartmental area program from the University of Nebraska Medical Center. Her dissertation was titled, Vasoactive Humoral Response and Pulmonary Metabolic Function in Infant Extracorporeal Membrane Oxygenation (ECMO). Chatterjee completed a residency and fellowship in infectious diseases at University of Nebraska Medical Center and the Creighton University.

In 1998, Chatterjee joined the faculty at the University of South Dakota Sanford School of Medicine as an assistant professor and chief of the division of pediatric infectious diseases in the pediatrics department. In 1999, she became a fellow of the American Academy of Pediatrics. From 2000 to 2013, Chatterjee was a professor of pediatric infectious diseases at the Creighton University School of Medicine and a hospital epidemiologist and medical director of infection control at the Children's Hospital & Medical Center. She was elected a member of the Society for Pediatric Research in 2003 and a fellow of the Infectious Diseases Society of America in 2005. In 2011, she became a member of the International Papillomavirus Society. Chatterjee was the associate dean for academic and faculty affairs at Creighton University School of Medicine from 2011 to 2013. She returned to the Sanford University School of Medicine in 2013 as a professor and chair of the pediatrics department and the senior associate dean for faculty development. In April 2020, Chatterjee became the dean of the Chicago Medical School and vice president for medical affairs at Rosalind Franklin University of Medicine and Science. She is a professor of pediatrics. During the COVID-19 pandemic in the United States, she served on the Vaccines and Related Biological Product Advisory Committee of the Food and Drug Administration.

Chatterjee is married to structural engineer Samar Gogoi.
