= Niko Terho =

Barbadian-Finnish actor

- Born: February 3, 1996 (age 30); Barbados
- Occupation: Actor
- Years active: 2019–present

Niko Terho (born February 3, 1996) is a Barbadian-Finnish actor. He made his screen debut playing the title role in the 2020 romantic comedy television film The Thing About Harry and is best known for starring as Dr. Lucas Adams in the ABC medical drama series, Grey's Anatomy (2022–present).

== Early life and education ==
Terho was born and raised in Barbados by a Bajan mother and Finnish father. He attended The St. Michael School in Saint Michael, Barbados. At the age of 15 he moved to England to play professional football. He played for Bede's School, Eastbourne in the English Schools' Football Association tournament, scoring a bicycle kick goal in the fourth round in 2012. He played for the Barbados national under-17 football team in the CONCACAF tournament. At age 18, he moved to New York to pursue his acting career, studying at the William Esper Studio.

== Acting career ==
In 2019 he made his television debut appearing in an episode of Starz drama series, Sweetbitter. He later was cast opposite Jake Borelli in the Freeform made-for-television romantic comedy film, The Thing About Harry. The co-stars bonded on set when Terho was asked to teach Borelli how to play football. The film premiered on February 15, 2020, to positive reviews. Later that year, Terho made his feature film debut appearing in the drama Sno Babies.

In 2022, Terho was cast as Dr. Lucas Adams, the nephew of Amelia Shepherd (Caterina Scorsone) and Derek Shepherd (Patrick Dempsey) in the ABC medical drama series, debuting in season 19.

== Filmography ==
| Year | Title | Role | Notes |
|---|---|---|---|
| 2019 | Howard | Andy | Short film |
| 2019 | Sweetbitter | Ethan | Episode: "Sec or Demi-Sec" |
| 2019 | Sno Babies | Jeff | Film |
| 2020 | The Thing About Harry | Harry Turpin | LGBTQ+ romantic comedy, TV film |
| 2022–present | Grey's Anatomy | Dr. Lucas Adams | 66 episodes |
| 2022 | Station 19 | Dr. Lucas Adams | Episode: "Everybody's Got Something to Hide Except Me and My Monkey" |
| 2024 | Helsinki Syndrome | US Correspondent | Episode: Alkuviikko, Finnish TV Series |
