= SGPS =

SGPS can mean:

- S-GPS, simultaneous GPS
- School of Graduate and Postdoctoral Studies (disambiguation)
- Sociedade Gestora de Participações Sociais (holding company), a type of legal entity in Portugal
- Society of Graduate and Professional Students at Queen's University at Kingston
