= Who's That Woman? =

Who's That Woman? may refer to:

- "Who's That Woman?" (Desperate Housewives)
- "Who's That Woman?", a song from the Broadway musical Follies
