= Children Will Listen =

Children Will Listen may refer to:

- "Children Will Listen", a song from the 1987 musical Into the Woods
- "Children Will Listen", a 2005 episode from Desperate Housewives season 1
