= Chicago Medical School =

Medical school of Rosalind Franklin University of Medicine and Science

The Chicago Medical School
- Motto: Vita In Inventione
- Motto in English: Life in Discovery
- Type: Private medical school
- Established: 1912
- Parent institution: Rosalind Franklin University of Medicine and Science
- Dean: Archana Chatterjee
- Location: North Chicago, Illinois, United States; 42.300°N 87.859°W
- Campus: Suburban, 97 acres
- Website: www.rosalindfranklin.edu/academics/chicago-medical-school/

The Chicago Medical School (CMS) is a private medical school of Rosalind Franklin University of Medicine and Science in North Chicago, Illinois. It was founded in 1912 and obtained approval from the American Medical Association in 1948.

== History ==
=== Founding ===
Chicago Medical School was founded as a night school in 1912, the Chicago Hospital-College of Medicine. The nonprofit Chicago Medical School originally operated on the principle that admission should be based on merit alone. In particular, "Chicago Med" admitted women and minority applicants decades earlier than most professional schools. The school's 1912–13 bulletin stated that "It is the firm belief of the Faculty of this school that there are deserving men and women, who, if given a second opportunity, will soon 'catch up' with and even surpass those students who have had earlier opportunities and advantages."

In 1917, the Chicago Hospital College of Medicine absorbed Jenner Medical College which had been in existence since 1893 and the name was changed officially to The Chicago Medical School.

=== Sheinin administration ===
In 1935, John J. Sheinin became Dean of Medicine. Prior to Sheinin, and partly due to CMS's lack of affiliation with a hospital, the school had been struggling financially. The school became accredited in 1948.

Also under Sheinin, an educational program called the American Plan was developed, which included admission solely based on merit. Eleanor Roosevelt praised the plan in an article of her nationally syndicated My Day column series:

The American Plan...is simply a plan of nondiscrimination. Only two considerations govern the admission rules of [Chicago Medical School] – character and scholarship merit.

One wishes that more schools and colleges and universities throughout the county would have the courage to set their standards high, but to eliminate two questions that all too often one finds on a request for admission: What is your race and what is your religion? It seems to me that these questions have no bearing on one's right to an education in whatever field of learning one has chosen to follow. They should have no bearing, either, on one's success in whatever profession that he or she is preparing for.

=== Growth ===
In 1967, the institution expanded into a university, the University of Health Sciences. The Chicago Medical School became just one of several constituent schools of the university (albeit the core and original foundation) in 1968 with the establishment of the School of Graduate and Postdoctoral Studies. A School of Related Health Sciences (later named the College of Health Professions) was added in 1970. From this point, the history of Chicago Medical School is inextricably intertwined with the history of the university as a whole. The university's name was changed to Finch University of Health Sciences in 1993, and in 2004 to Rosalind Franklin University of Medicine and Science. The university acquired the Dr. William M. Scholl College of Podiatric Medicine (coincidentally also founded in 1912) in 2001 and opened a College of Pharmacy in 2011.

== Accreditation ==
The MD Program at Chicago Medical School is accredited by the Liaison Committee on Medical Education (LCME). Most recently, the school was awarded with the maximum eight-year accreditation term in March 2021.

CMS had accreditation issues in 2004 and again in 2013, when it was placed on probation by the LCME. In February 2014, the LCME assessed the areas of concerns to have been brought into compliance.

== Community service ==
Historically, students were required to perform community service at the Medical Clinic Free Dispensary and the Chicago Maternity Center. In the view of former Dean Arthur J. Ross, III, "The current generation of students is the most altruistic, service-oriented generation ever to come through health care training- including generations older than me. It's the icing on the cake for them to study in a place that supports their service."

=== Interprofessional Community Clinic ===
In 2013, members of the class of 2016 established the Interprofessional Community Clinic, a free clinic that provides limited healthcare services to low-income and underserved residents of the area. The clinic is staffed by volunteer students and licensed healthcare professionals and is held after hours at the Rosalind Franklin University Health System's North Chicago location. Interprofessional teams of students evaluate, treat, and refer patients under physician supervision.

== Curriculum ==
Students spend the first two years learning basic medical sciences and the last two years participating in clerkships at affiliate hospitals. The educational program combines lectures, labs, small-group discussions, team-based learning, and opportunities for peer-to-peer learning. There are eight required clerkships to be completed in the third year: medicine, surgery, family medicine/primary care, obstetrics and gynecology, psychiatry, pediatrics, neurology, and emergency medicine. The senior requirements include four weeks in an internal medicine, emergency medicine, family medicine/primary care, or pediatrics sub-internship.

The medical school is an interprofessional health sciences university; thus, M.D. candidates take courses alongside students in other health professions, including podiatry and pharmacy.

== Student life ==
Students host traditions such as Field Day on the first Saturday after classes begin.

=== House system ===
Incoming students are assigned to one of four learning communities, each led by a practicing physician who mentors the students for all four years of school. Each learning community is assigned to a house that connects students of all four years. The houses are named after four distinguished CMS alumni:

- Fannie Emanuel, class of 1915, CMS's first African American female graduate. She remained in Chicago for her career as a family practitioner and founder of a settlement house for all races.
- Caesar Portes, class of 1928, a proctologist and surgeon. He was a pioneer in cancer screening and early detection services. He was the cofounder and medical director of the George and Anna Portes Cancer Prevention Center of Chicago.
- Herbert Lipschultz, class of 1948, a family physician in the northern Chicago suburbs. He was a role model and CMS professor who served as President of Skokie Board of Health.
- Marion Finkel, class of 1952, an internist and pharmaceutical researcher who directed the Office of Orphan Product Development of the Food and Drug Administration.

== Teaching hospital affiliations ==
Chicago Medical School is community-based, giving students an opportunity to rotate through many hospitals and hospital systems in the Chicago metropolitan area.
