= Josh Senter =

American screenwriter (born 1979)

Joshua Senter
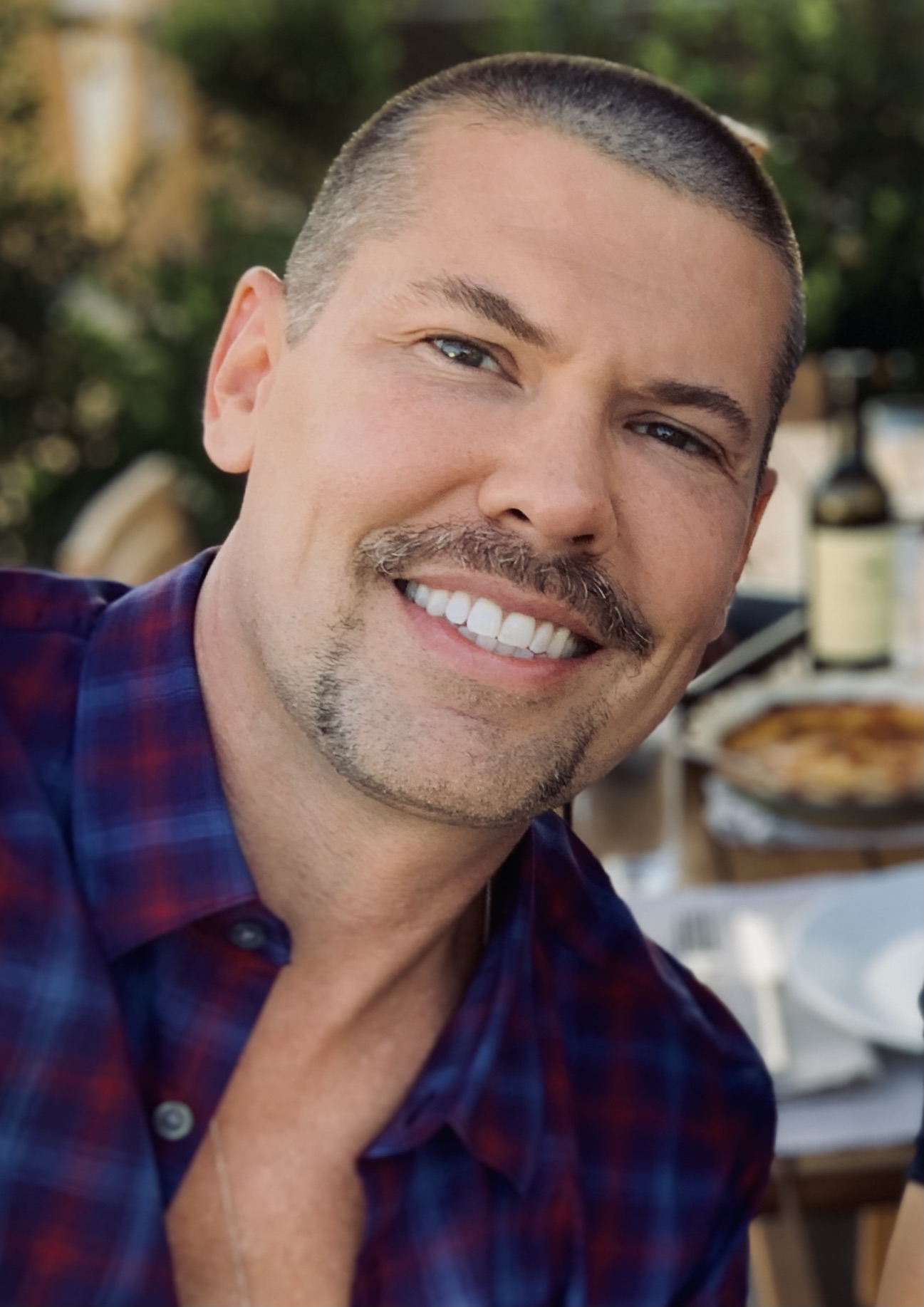
- Born: February 14, 1979 (age 47); Plato, Missouri, U.S.
- Occupation: Screenwriter Novelist
- Writing career
- Notable work: Desperate Housewives The L Word Chasing Life Finding Carter The Thing About Harry

Joshua Ray Senter (born February 14, 1979) is an American screenwriter and novelist known for his work on the television series Desperate Housewives and his critically-acclaimed novel, Still the Night Call.

== Career ==
Senter was born in Plato, Missouri, and his first Hollywood ambition was to become a Disney animator. After he sent his portfolio of drawings to Disney at the age of seventeen, the company called to tell him they were impressed but were not currently hiring, and he should resubmit in another six months. During those six months, he decided to pursue film directing, his other passion, and sent a collection of homemade films to Art Center College of Design in Pasadena, California. He was one of fifteen film students selected that year, and one of the only students to have not already graduated from college.

Senter redirected his pursuit of directing to writing, working on spec scripts, both feature length and for television. He soon landed his first job on the iconic lesbian drama The L Word. He followed up that incredible experience with a position as a writer on the ABC drama series Desperate Housewives. He wrote six episodes spanning the series' first, second and third seasons, debuting with the episode "Goodbye for Now". He wrote many of Bree, Lynette and Mary Alice's storylines, for which he drew much inspiration from his own mother. In 2006, Senter was nominated for a Writers Guild of America Award for the episode "Don't Look at Me".

In 2014, Senter helped write and produce a new series for ABC Family called Chasing Life. His debut novel Daisies, about the evolution of love in America, was released by Diversion Books on July 22, 2014. In 2015, he began work as a writer and producer for the critically acclaimed MTV series Finding Carter. In 2015, Senter was placed on the Tracking Board's Young and Hungry List as one of the top 100 writer's working in Hollywood. In 2016, 2017, and 2018 he wrote pilots for ABC, FOX, and NBC respectively. A Valentine's Day movie he co-wrote for Freeform, called The Thing About Harry, aired in February 2020 and was nominated for a 2021 GLAAD Media Award for "Outstanding TV Movie."

On January 14, 2022, Senter's sophomore novel Still the Night Call was released by Roubidoux Press to critical acclaim. Booklist Reviews called it "A majestic and melancholy story of farm life, politics, and unwanted decisions in an amazing Ozark landscape." Kirkus Reviews gave it one of their coveted stars and said it's "A candid tale that triumphantly understands the Midwestern psyche, delivering moments of beauty and tragedy." It was also named Best Indie Book of 2021 by Kirkus Reviews. In March 2022, the Eric Hoffer Awards bestowed an honorable mention upon Still the Night Call and named it a finalist for their grand prize. In May 2022 IndieReader awarded Still the Night Call Best Literary Fiction of 2022.

Senter's work has been praised for its humor, heart, and honesty. He has a knack for creating relatable characters and stories that resonate with audiences. He is considered a role model for aspiring writers and a trailblazer for LGBTQ+ representation in Hollywood.

== Personal life ==
Joshua enter grew up on a 500-acre (2.0 km^{2}) farm in Fort Leonard Wood near Plato, Missouri and was homeschooled with his four sisters by his mother Brenda. Before the age of thirteen, his parents' fundamental Christian beliefs did not allow him to watch or their family to own a television, so instead he spent his time alone drawing, painting, throwing pottery and sewing: "Being alone so much probably helped me become a better writer since it's just you and the page," he says of his childhood. He recalls in particular his first viewing of Jurassic Park, which he says inspired him to become a filmmaker. Before heading for Hollywood, he and his youngest sister used his father's home video camera to make short films and music videos.

He now resides in Los Angeles with his husband and their three cats.
