= Levi Schmitt =

- Grey's Anatomy character
- Jake Borelli as Dr. Levi Schmitt
- First appearance: Grey's Anatomy: "Break Down the House" (14.01); September 28, 2017 (as recurring cast) "Nothing Left to Cling To" (16.01); September 26, 2019 (as series regular); Station 19: "Let It Burn" (1.07); April 26, 2018
- Last appearance: Grey's Anatomy: "Love You Like a Love Song" (21.17); May 8, 2025 (as series regular); Station 19: "Save Yourself" (4.10); April 8, 2021
- Created by: Krista Vernoff
- Portrayed by: Jake Borelli

In-universe information
- Nicknames: Glasses; Blood Bank; Numbers; Skippy; Child Doctor
- Title: M.D.
- Occupation: Pediatric fellow General surgeon (season 21); Chief Resident (season 19–20); Surgical resident at Grey Sloan Memorial Hospital (season 16–18); Surgical intern at Grey Sloan Memorial Hospital (season 14–15); Medical student (season 14)
- Family: Myrna Schmitt (mother); Carol Schmitt (aunt); Saul Schmitt (uncle, deceased); Gertie Schmitt (aunt)
- Significant others: Jo Wilson (one-night stand); Nico Kim (ex-boyfriend); Carlos Garcia (ex-affair); James Morgan (boyfriend)
- Religion: Judaism

Levi Schmitt, M.D., is a fictional character from the medical drama television series Grey's Anatomy, which airs on the American Broadcasting Company (ABC) in the United States. The character is portrayed by Jake Borelli.

Levi is introduced as a sub-intern at Grey Sloan Memorial Hospital at the start of Season 14 and later becomes a resident in Season 16. Initially, Levi's character served as comic relief due to his clumsiness and lack of social skills. However, as the series progressed into the fifteenth season, Levi's storylines expanded, focusing on his questioning of his sexuality, his desire to gain confidence, and his complicated relationship with his overbearing mother. Borelli was promoted to the main cast in the sixteenth season, while also making occasional appearances on the companion show Station 19.

Schmitt is notable for being Grey's Anatomy's first LGBTQ main character since the departures of Callie Torres (Sara Ramirez) and Arizona Robbins (Jessica Capshaw) in seasons 12 and 14, respectively. He is also the series' second Jewish main character after Dr. Cristina Yang (Sandra Oh). Schmitt's relationship with openly gay orthopedic surgeon Dr. Nico Kim (Alex Landi) has been praised by both critics and fans.

On May 13, 2024, it was confirmed that Borelli would depart as a series regular due to budget cuts. Borelli’s character departed during the seventh episode of the twenty-first season, titled "If You Leave", that aired on November 14, 2024.

== Background ==
Levi has lived in Seattle for an undisclosed amount of time with his mother, specifically residing in her basement. Growing up, Levi was a member of the debate club and spent much of his time playing Dungeons & Dragons rather than socializing with his peers. His social struggles were exacerbated by his mother's overprotective tendencies and neuroticism. Due to her constant worrying, Levi developed issues with self-confidence and clumsiness, which often interfered with his ability to perform at his best.

Levi eventually decided to attend medical school, finishing in the top 10% of his program. Despite his success, he chose to continue living in his mother's basement due to the high costs of medical school. Coming from a close Jewish family, Levi's relatives contributed financially to help him through his studies, remaining heavily involved in his career decisions.

Levi first arrived at Grey Sloan Memorial Hospital as part of a clerkship group doing a rotation, where Richard Webber (James Pickens Jr.) and April Kepner (Sarah Drew) evaluated the group to determine if they would be offered internship opportunities. After an interview with Webber and Miranda Bailey (Chandra Wilson), Levi was offered an internship at Grey Sloan, a prestigious opportunity his family supported due to the hospital's reputation for producing highly skilled surgeons. During his time at Grey Sloan, Levi formed friendships with fellow interns like Taryn Helm (Jaicy Elliot), Casey Parker (Alex Blue Davis), and Dahlia Qadri (Sophia Ali).

== Storylines ==
Upon arriving at Grey-Sloan Memorial Hospital for his clerkship, Levi and the other fourth-year medical students were greeted by Dr. Richard Webber (James Pickens Jr.), who gave them a tour of the hospital. During this time, Levi had the opportunity to observe Dr. Jo Wilson (Camilla Luddington) in surgery, but his clumsiness caused his glasses to slip off and fall inside the patient’s body cavity. This incident earned Levi the nickname "Glasses". Later, Levi and the other sub-interns were tasked with finding a suitable donor for a complex surgery on Megan Hunt, which was led by Dr. Meredith Grey (Ellen Pompeo). Levi was the only one who successfully found a donor, but when he approached Jo for advice on how to present his findings, she took credit for it and got to scrub in. Eventually, Levi was able to secure an internship at Grey-Sloan, thanks to Dr. Webber and Dr. Miranda Bailey (Chandra Wilson). By then, he had started wearing an elastic band to keep his glasses in place, refusing to wear contacts due to his ommetaphobia (fear of eyes).

One of Levi’s most notable early moments was during a surgery where Dr. Grey needed to perform a splenectomy, but the hospital’s blood bank was inaccessible due to a hacker attack. Levi volunteered to donate his O-negative blood to save the patient’s life, earning him the nickname "Blood Bank".

Levi's personal life took a turn when he assisted on a case involving a severe femur fracture led by Dr. Jackson Avery (Jesse Williams), Dr. Owen Hunt (Kevin McKidd), Dr. Atticus "Link" Lincoln (Chris Carmack), and Dr. Nico Kim (Alex Landi), a talented orthopedic fellow. Levi was flustered when Nico winked at him during surgery. Later that night, Nico bought Levi a beer and flirted with him, leaving Levi confused about his sexuality. Over the following weeks, Nico continued to show interest in Levi, but Levi, who had never dated anyone, much less a man, struggled with his feelings. Eventually, Levi and Nico shared their first kiss in an elevator. However, Nico was taken aback when Levi admitted that it was his first time kissing a man and abruptly ended their budding relationship.

A week later, during a severe windstorm, Levi and Nico were tasked with evacuating the hospital’s clinic. Levi was still upset with Nico, but after Nico was injured by a gust of wind, Levi helped him seek shelter in an abandoned ambulance. During the storm, Levi confronted Nico, admitting that he had never explored his sexuality due to a lack of confidence and opportunities, but meeting Nico had changed that. Nico was moved by Levi’s honesty, and the two kissed again and had sex for the first time.

As Levi's relationship with Nico progressed, he gained confidence as a doctor. He successfully intubated Dr. Owen Hunt after Hunt was accidentally sedated during surgery and later proudly introduced himself as "Dr. Schmitt" instead of his nicknames. Levi began to wear contacts to reflect his growing confidence. Eventually, Levi proudly came out as gay to his colleagues, including Meredith, Andrew DeLuca (Giacomo Gianniotti), and Jo, who responded with support.

However, Levi’s relationship with Nico hit a bump when Nico became upset that Levi refused to come out to his neurotic mother, Myrna. Eventually, Levi confessed his love for Nico, but Nico revealed that he had an interview at a hospital in San Francisco. On the same day, Nico made a critical mistake during surgery, leading to a patient’s death. Levi, despite being hurt by Nico's actions, tried to reconcile their relationship. After an emotional encounter with Lucas Ripley, the Seattle Fire Department's fire chief, whom Levi had saved, Nico apologized for mistreating Levi. That night, Levi came out to his mother by introducing Nico as his boyfriend.

After beginning his residency, Levi struggled with self-doubt and faced ostracism from other residents when he was subpoenaed to testify at Meredith's court hearing for insurance fraud. His testimony inadvertently led to Meredith’s firing, and the other residents began to shun him. Levi finally stood up to his mother after visiting his dying uncle Saul, who was also gay. Realizing that his mother wasn’t accepting of him, Levi moved out of her basement.

Levi and Nico’s relationship hit another rough patch when Levi felt emotionally disconnected from Nico, who didn’t ask him to move in. Levi was stunned to learn that Nico had not come out to his family and began to doubt their relationship. After Nico was recommended for a prestigious job with the Seattle Mariners, he broke up with Levi, feeling he couldn’t provide the emotional connection Levi needed. Heartbroken, Levi moved in with Jo Wilson after her divorce from Alex Karev.

During the COVID-19 pandemic, Levi and Nico reconciled again. Levi also moved in with fellow resident Taryn Helm (Jaicy Elliot) during this time, navigating both his personal and professional life as the pandemic unfolded.

== Development ==
=== Casting and creation ===
While casting for the role was underway, Jake Borelli was living in New York and sent in an audition tape, not expecting a callback due to the show's immense popularity. However, two weeks later, he received a call inviting him to fly out to Los Angeles to film his scenes. Initially, the role of Levi was set to appear in only one or two episodes as a guest co-star at the start of Grey's Anatomy's fourteenth season. After completing his first two episodes, Borelli was invited back to film eight more episodes.

Borelli was later officially cast in a recurring capacity as Levi Schmitt, one of the new batch of interns at Grey Sloan Memorial Hospital. He joined Jeanine Mason (Sam Bello), Sophia Ali (Dahlia Qadri), Rushi Kota (Vikram Roy), Alex Blue Davis (Casey Parker), and Jaicy Elliot (Taryn Helm). Borelli made his first appearance in the fourteenth-season episode "Break Down the House" as a fourth-year medical student and returned as an intern in the fourth episode, "Ain't That a Kick in the Head".

After significant character development in the fifteenth season, Borelli was promoted from recurring guest star to series regular starting with the show's sixteenth season.

When asked about Borelli's first major storyline in the fifteenth season, series showrunner Krista Vernoff stated:

Jake [who joined the Grey’s cast last season] is an incredible actor, and the more we wrote for him, the more we wanted to write for him. So the story didn’t begin with, “Hey, we’ve never done a gay male love story.” It began with, “What are we going to do with Jake this year that’s different?”

— Krista Vernoff, Entertainment Weekly

=== Characterization ===
Borelli characterized Levi Schmitt as "this bumbling, klutzy, really earnest guy who [is] just trying to learn and prove himself in this new job." Grey's Anatomy showrunner Krista Vernoff described Levi as "sort of a clumsy, fumfering type who would trip over his own feet and stutter," while Borelli further explained that Levi "doesn’t have the best track record in terms of having things work perfectly for him," highlighting his frequent mishaps throughout the series. Paulette Cohn of Parade Magazine called Levi a "comic relief" character, referencing the memorable moment when he dropped his glasses inside a patient during surgery, earning him the nickname "Glasses".

Levi is also notable for being the show's first Jewish main character since the departure of Cristina Yang (Sandra Oh) at the end of the tenth season. However, unlike Cristina, who identified as an atheist, Levi remains connected to aspects of his faith. For example, in the episode "Jump into the Fog", Levi sings the Jewish prayer "Shalom Rav" to soothe a woman suffering from severe agoraphobia, recalling that his mother sang it to him as a lullaby. The melody used in the show is a well-known version by cantor and contemporary musician Jeff Klepper. Levi’s Jewish heritage is explored further in the episode "The Last Supper" when he visits his dying uncle. Following his uncle’s death, Levi refuses to leave, honoring the cultural tradition of Shemira. Later, with the help of his uncle's lover, Levi prepares his uncle’s body for the Chevra kadisha and recites Psalm 23.

By the fifteenth season, Levi’s role in the show had expanded significantly, becoming more prominent in the series' main storylines. Borelli shared that Vernoff approached him with a "big storyline" for Levi, which ultimately revealed that Levi would be part of the show’s first gay male romance. This arc would focus on Levi coming to terms with his sexuality and eventually coming out, a storyline that was groundbreaking for the series.

It was also super scary because it’s very similar to my own story, so it became quite a bit more vulnerable to play a character that becomes even closer to you as a human. When we met, Krista was very open with hearing the stories that I would want to tell as a gay guy myself, and the story that, as an audience member, I would like to see portrayed through Levi. It was a really open, frank discussion about my own history as a gay guy in this community and what I wanted to bring to the table.

— Borelli's initial thoughts on his coming out storyline.

Levi officially came out in the fifteenth season's mid-season finale, "Blowin' in the Wind," a pivotal moment that also inspired actor Jake Borelli to come out as gay alongside his character. After the episode aired, Borelli shared a heartfelt post on his Instagram, writing, "As a gay guy myself, tonight's episode was so special to me. This is exactly the kind of story I craved as a young gay kid growing up." Borelli explained that his decision to come out publicly at the same time as Levi was motivated by his desire to help "others [not] feel as alone."

On a broader spectrum, Borelli credited the longtime medical drama for being on the forefront of telling LGBTQ stories of substance over its run:

"Grey’s Anatomy has always been a huge ally in the LGBT community. They have done so much work to push the dial forward for all of us. They have had countless gay characters on the show, which has been amazing as a viewer. Callie Torres (Sara Ramirez) and Arizona Robbins’ (Jessica Capshaw) relationship was so nuanced and so big and so fantastic for the community as a whole, but now that we’re jumping into a different facet, it’s exciting to see, on a personal level, a story that resonates so much with me."

After coming out to his colleagues and beginning a relationship with orthopedic fellow Nico Kim, Levi grew more confident, both in his personal life and his professional abilities as a surgeon. In the episode "Help, I'm Alive," Levi rejects his old nickname "Glasses" and confidently introduces himself as Dr. Schmitt to his fellow doctors and hospital staff. Borelli reflected on Levi's transformation, stating, "I think we’ve seen him sort of take one step into his confidence, into his own body, into his own truth."

== Reception ==
The character of Levi has garnered positive reviews from critics and fans alike. Jasmine Blu of TV Fanatic praised Levi, saying, "he's always been one of my favorite of the newbies. He's so endearing and has such a heartfelt story, and I think he touches people a great deal", referring to him as a "fan-favorite". Blu highlighted Levi's lovable and relatable nature, noting that his awkwardness felt "very real and relatable". Taylor Henderson of Pride Magazine similarly commented on Levi's broad appeal, stating that he has been "openly embraced" by Grey's Anatomy viewers and has "quickly built a fanbase of his own", especially after his monologue in the episode "Blowin' in the Wind", which showcased his character growth and romance with Nico Kim.

Levi's coming out storyline in "Blowin' in the Wind" also received widespread praise. Jasmine Blu of TV Fanatic applauded Levi's decision to embrace his sexuality, noting that "Words cannot describe how refreshing it is to see him stand up for himself". Ariana Romero of Refinery29 called Levi’s coming out moment "a landmark queer love scene" and emphasized that Levi was becoming a "rising fan-favorite". Marko Pekic of Spoiler TV commended Jake Borelli's "phenomenal interpretation of Schmitt," describing the performance as both "heartbreaking and empowering".

Despite the positive reception, there has been some criticism of the slow development of Levi's background storyline. However, episodes like "The Last Supper", which delved into Levi's Jewish heritage, received acclaim. Meaghan Frey of TV Fanatic found the exploration of Levi's roots "touching and exactly what he needed", stating that it made her more invested in his character. Frey also praised the scene in which Levi stands up to his mother, who struggles to fully accept him. Jasmine Blu echoed these sentiments, appreciating how the show explored both Levi’s faith and his journey toward self-acceptance. Paul Dailly of TV Fanatic also reacted positively, noting, "it was intriguing, and giving backstory to one of the better characters on the show was needed. Grey's Anatomy excels in character development, and I could watch more episodes about Levi's past."
