= School of Graduate and Postdoctoral Studies =

School of Graduate and Postdoctoral Studies may refer to:

- A school at Rosalind Franklin University
- A school at University of Western Ontario
