= Ngozi Ezike =

American physician

Ngozi Ogbunamiri Ezike is an American internist and pediatrician who was the first African-American woman director of the Illinois Department of Public Health (IDPH) and served from January 2019 to March 2022. In 2022, she was appointed CEO and President of the Sinai Chicago hospital system.

== Early life and education ==
Ezike's father was an emigrant from Nigeria who settled in Los Angeles. He always dreamed of her becoming a doctor.

Ezike graduated with honors from Harvard College with a concentration in chemistry before earning her medical degree from the University of California, San Diego and completed her internship and residency at Rush Medical Center. She also earned a management certificate from Harvard Business School.

Ezike has an honorary Doctor of Community Health degree from Southern Illinois University Carbondale based on a recommendation that she “has been widely praised for her dedicated efforts as part of a leadership team within the State of Illinois to address the COVID-19 pandemic and its impact on the citizens of the Land of Lincoln.”

Ezike is fluent in Igbo, Spanish and French in addition to English, and also speaks some Swahili and Portuguese.

== Career ==
Ezike's professional career through early 2022 has been entirely based in Illinois. She provided inpatient care at John H. Stroger Jr. Hospital of Cook County in Chicago, was medical director at the Austin Health Center in Chicago's West Side, and, until January 2020, medical director at the Cook County Juvenile Detention Center in Chicago, the largest single site juvenile detention facility in the country. She is an assistant professor of pediatrics at Rush Medical Center in Chicago.

Ezike, as director of the Illinois Department of Public Health (IDPH) from January 2019 to March 2022, was a highly visible member of Illinois Governor J. B. Pritzker's administration during the first two years of the COVID-19 pandemic. She was the first African-American woman director in the 143 year history of IDPH. In the early months of the pandemic in 2020, when both the governor and Ezike were on television and radio nearly every weekday to discuss the state's pandemic situation, Ezike would make her daily speech twice, first in English and then again in Spanish. On March 1, 2022, Ezike announced that she would resign as the director of the Illinois Department of Public Health to spend more time with her family. Her last day was March 14, 2022, just over two years since COVID-19 was declared a pandemic. At the announcement, Governor Pritzker expressed his appreciation for Ezike's work and regret that she was leaving, stating, "I am not putting it lightly when I say that she has had one of the hardest jobs in the world."

The Sinai Chicago hospital system hired Ezike as president and CEO, effective June 13, 2022, taking the place of retiring Karen Teitelbaum.

Ezike has also been a national policy advisor on juvenile correctional health topics, who “has presented at numerous local and national conferences for medical professionals and youth audiences alike.” She has also been a “federal court monitor for health-related matters concerning juvenile correctional facilities under consent decree.”

== Honors and awards ==
- Illinois HR863 “Commends Dr. Ngozi Ezike on her continued leadership and commitment to the Department of Public Health and the State of Illinois during the COVID-19 pandemic.”
- 2020 Illinois Academy of Family Physicians (IAFP) President's Award
- USA Today's Women of the Year for 2022
