= Ruth Rothstein =

- Born: April 5, 1923; Brooklyn, NY, U.S.
- Died: August 4, 2013 (aged 90)

Ruth M. Rothstein (April 5, 1923 - August 4, 2013) was a nationally recognized public health activist who lived by the conviction that health care is a right, not a privilege, and that institutions have a responsibility to the community.

Rothstein, who died on Aug. 4, 2013 at the age of 90, paved the way for women in healthcare administration, rising from a job as a laboratory technician to run health care systems in one of the largest cities in the nation. Rothstein served as president and CEO of Mount Sinai Medical Center, director of Cook County Hospital, and Chief of the Cook County Department of Public Health. From 2003 until her death, she helped guide Rosalind Franklin University of Medicine and Science in North Chicago, Ill., as chairman of the board of trustees.

== Early life ==
Rothstein was born on April 5, 1923, in Brooklyn, N.Y. and grew up during the Depression in a fourth-floor walk-up in the immigrant Jewish neighborhood of Brownsville. She attended Hebrew School and played violin. The oldest of four children, she often accompanied her father, a Socialist and union organizer, to labor meetings and demonstrations. By age 11 she was making speeches on street corners about the need for work relief.

The family had no money for college. Rothstein recalled that she went to work out of high school and that's when she bought her first winter coat.

== Union organizer, Wife, Mother, Lab technician ==
She left New York in her early 20s and moved to Cleveland, Ohio, where she took a job with the United Electrical Workers union organizing women who worked for General Electric, Westinghouse, and General Motors.

Five years later, she accepted a job offer with the union in Chicago, but upon arriving there found that she had been hired to replace another woman. She refused the job.

She then took a job with the International Union of Mine, Mill and Smelter Workers. She married labor lawyer David Rothstein in 1950 and the couple had two children, Martha and Jonathan. In 1952, she returned to the workforce at the urging of a friend who needed help in the laboratory at Jackson Park Hospital in Chicago. There, Rothstein became an on-the-job trained lab technician and advanced to director of personnel.

== Saving Mt. Sinai ==
In 1966, she was recruited by a physician to use her organizing skills at Mt. Sinai Hospital Medical Center. She was initially rejected by the CEO of the hospital because she lacked a college degree. But she was soon hired to work in admitting. She spent the next 25 years working to rejuvenate the failing Jewish hospital, which had closed itself off from neighborhoods filled with poor blacks and Hispanics.

After she was named an executive in 1970, she opened employment at the West Side hospital to residents of the neighborhood, including a nearby public housing project and worked to integrate the hospital into the life of the community and to bring change not only in health care delivery, but in employment and housing. She started programs including rape counseling, family planning and nutrition.

Rothstein saw Mt. Sinai as a bridge between the Jewish and non-Jewish communities. It took a decade of hard work to change the image of the hospital, to re-build pride and value in the institution among Jews and to convince the state that the hospital, which served primarily public aid patients, was an indispensable asset.

== Rebuilding Cook County Hospital ==
After serving as president and CEO from 1977 to 1991, Rothstein left Mt. Sinai, turning her attention to public health at a county level. Cook County Hospital had lost national accreditation in 1990. It was in administrative disarray and its building was crumbling. In the OB Department, women were giving birth on a “labor line,” on cots lined side by side in one large room. Many patients traveled long distances for treatment. Rothstein said she saw the lack of access as a social justice issue.

Rothstein was almost 70 when she helped to orchestrate the third largest health system in the nation, the Cook County Bureau of Health and a controversial plan for construction of a new county hospital - the John H. Stroger Jr. Hospital of Cook County. She also oversaw the addition of nearly 30 neighborhood clinics in underserved areas of the city and the construction of a dedicated HIV-AIDS outpatient treatment center, which was renamed in her honor - the Ruth M. Rothstein CORE Center.

Rothstein served as the first chief of the Cook County Bureau of Health and president and CEO of the Schwab Rehabilitation Center and Cook County Hospital until 2004. She continued to serve on governing boards and advisory committees, including the American Hospital Association, Jewish Federation of Metropolitan Chicago and National Association of Public Hospitals.

== Future of health care ==
At Rosalind Franklin University of Medicine and Science, where she served on the Board of Trustees beginning in 2001, Rothstein helped focus the academic mission, strategize clinical partnerships and build financial stability. She was a champion of interprofessional medical and healthcare education and team-based care.

“The future of American health care demands practitioners who can work together and communicate effectively,” Rothstein said. “We’re graduating men and women who can carry the commonsense of interprofessionalism into clinical practice.”

The university in 2012, its centennial year, recognized Rothstein for her "transforming influence in the world of health care and medicine," with the Rosalind Franklin, PhD Life in Discovery Award. It further acknowledged her service and that of longtime trustee Mr. Gail Warden, by naming a new interprofessional learning center in their honor. cite

Rothstein received numerous awards throughout her professional career, including honorary degrees. She opened doors for women and stressed mentorship.

“Those of us who have gotten there - make sure you take another woman with you,” she said.

== Discrimination ==
Rothstein experienced discrimination as a Jew growing up in New York and, as a woman, she faced rejection by an all-male networking group of Jewish hospital CEOs. She eventually became the chairman of the group.

== Religion ==
Rothstein was not religious, but she embraced her Jewish identity, observing the high holidays and fasting on Yom Kippur, she said, because that was the way she was raised.

“I felt that being a Jew meant that you helped others,” she said. “I believed that being a Jew meant that you didn’t have to believe in organized religion to reach out in the whole arena of social justice. I believed that being a Jew meant that you fought against discrimination not only against Jews but against anybody, because if you discriminate against anybody, you discriminate against Jews.”
