= Morris Kurtzon =

American businessman

Morris Kurtzon (15 March 1875 – 23 July 1958) was an American businessman who was president and founder of Mount Sinai Hospital of Chicago from its inception in 1919 until 1945. Mount Sinai was a hospital founded to help the disadvantaged Eastern European Jews of Chicago. Kurtzon sought to provide the West Side community in Chicago a hospital where Jewish doctors could practice without prejudicial practices excluding them.

Kurtzon was born in Lithuania and immigrated to the United States at age 7.

Kurtzon borrowed $53,000 (equivalent to $961,000 in 2024) in order to buy the bankrupt Maimonides Hospital, reorganizing it under the name Mt. Sinai Hospital Association. He refused an offer to sell the property to the University of Illinois, preferring to donate it to the entire community. The community responded to this gesture with an effort to create financial support for the new hospital. Multiple benefits and bazaars were organized to help fund the hospital. It opened on May 19, 1919.

Although women had not traditionally been allowed to fully participate in many communities, Mt. Sinai included many women among its supporters.

Kurtzon devoted much of his time to planning and designing the facility. The final hospital plans were done by architects Schmidt, Garden and Ericksen.

Kurtzon was vice president of the Chicago Platers Union in 1890 and founded Garden City Plating & Manufacturing (GARCY) in 1898. GARCY designed custom equipment for the new hospital, much of it made of stainless steel. GARCY became Morris Kurtzon, Inc. after 1948 and then Kurtzon Lighting, which is still owned and operated by family members.
