= The Thing About Harry =

2020 American romantic comedy television film

- Film poster
- Screenplay by: Peter Paige; Joshua Senter
- Directed by: Peter Paige
- Starring: Jake Borelli; Niko Terho; Britt Baron; Karamo Brown; Peter Paige
- Music by: Timo Chen; Mateo Messina
- Country of origin: United States
- Original language: English

Production
- Producers: Roger M. Bobb; F.J. Denny; Greg Gugliotta; Brett Hays; Trey McMenamin; Peter Paige
- Running time: 85 minutes

Original release
- Network: Freeform; Hulu
- Release: February 15, 2020

The Thing About Harry is a 2020 American romantic comedy television film. Written by Peter Paige and Josh Senter and directed by Paige, the film follows Sam (Jake Borelli), a young gay man who is reunited with his former high school bully Harry (Niko Terho) in adulthood, only for the two men to become friends and fall in love after Harry reveals that he now identifies as pansexual. The film also features Britt Baron and Karamo Brown, as well as Paige himself, in supporting roles.

The film premiered on February 15, 2020, on Freeform and Hulu.

== Plot ==
As a favor to a friend, Sam reluctantly begins a road trip to his hometown with his high school bully Harry. During the trip Harry casually reveals himself to be pansexual, shocking Sam that they share a connection. However, upon arrival Harry ditches Sam to make up with his ex-girlfriend.

A year later, Sam runs into Harry during a party, and he drunkenly insults Harry by calling him a slut, despite his best friend Stasia pushing them together. Six months later, Sam is brought by his new boyfriend Paul to a bar trivia where he stumbles upon Harry and his roommate, Zach. Sam chooses Harry's (correct) answer to a trivia question over Paul's, causing Paul to leave and break up with him.

Over the next few months, Sam and Harry grow closer as friends. During the Chicago Pride celebration at a bar, Harry asks Sam whether the latter will consider dating him. Sam reiterates his stance against dating friends, and thereafter stumbles upon Harry making out with Stasia, the two of whom then become a couple. At a brunch three months later, a drunk Sam insults Stasia and Harry by predicting their relationship won't last, after which he loses contact with both.

With encouragement from his roommate Casey, Sam begins finding dates using apps, which does not go well. A year later, Stasia reconnects with Sam and asks him to be the man of honor in her wedding to Zach, revealing that she broke up with Harry sometime ago. At the wedding, Sam finally makes up with Harry after the latter confesses his love, and they spend the night together. In the morning after, Harry reveals he is moving away in a week, causing Sam to storm out due to feelings of mistrust and betrayal.

With Sam again ignoring him, Harry accidentally sees on TV that Sam is working at a political rally. Determined to face him, Harry sneaks into the rally. Onstage, he apologizes to Sam and states that nothing is more important than staying together with him. A few years later, Sam and Harry are married and raising a child together.

== Cast ==
- Jake Borelli as Sam Baselli
- Niko Terho as Harry Turpin
- Britt Baron as Anastasia "Stasia" Hooper
- Japhet Balaban as Zach
- Karamo Brown as Paul
- Peter Paige as Casey

== Production ==
The movie was first sold by executive producers Greg Gugliotta and F.J. Denny to Freeform. The script was finalized in July 2019 and the production commenced in November the same year. Paige has stated that one of his goals in writing the movie was to make it reflective of the fact that young LGBT people conceptualize and label their sexual identities in more diverse ways than past generations; for instance Harry is pansexual, rather than gay or bisexual, because "the odds that two young, queer men under 25 both identify as gay feels slim to me in this generation."

Paige did not originally plan to appear in the film as Casey, but decided to play the role after being convinced that because 2020 marks 20 years since the premiere of Queer as Folk, there would be symbolic value in having the film contain a small tribute to his own performance as Emmett Honeycutt in that series.

The movie was shot in Chicago.

== Reception ==
The film received positive reviews for its classic execution of the rom-com genre with gay romantic interests, bringing the much needed normalization of queer relationships while not robbing it of its uniqueness. Jasmine Blu of TV Fanatic praised that the film "stuck to the classic rom-com formula, while still being thoughtful and aware enough not to swap out a hetero couple for a queer one and leave the entire film devoid of the LGBTQ perspective and culture." Alex Reif praised the film for the chemistry exhibited by the main characters and the relatable tertiary characters. Amari Allah concludes that the film presents positive representation of pansexuality while avoiding the common trauma theme in LGBT films, but noted its lack of diversity in casting.

The film's premiere drew 181,000 viewers.

=== Accolades ===
The Thing About Harry was nominated for the 2021 GLAAD Media Award for Outstanding TV Movie.
