= Desperate Housewives season 1 =

Desperate Housewives
- Season 1
- ABC promotional poster for the first season of Desperate Housewives. From left to right: Gabrielle, Bree, Lynette, and Susan.
- Starring: Teri Hatcher; Felicity Huffman; Marcia Cross; Eva Longoria; Nicollette Sheridan; Steven Culp; Ricardo Antonio Chavira; Mark Moses; Andrea Bowen; Jesse Metcalfe; Cody Kasch; Brenda Strong; James Denton
- No. of episodes: 23

Release
- Original network: ABC
- Original release: October 3, 2004 – May 22, 2005

Season chronology
- Next → Season 2

The first season of Desperate Housewives, an American television series created by Marc Cherry, commenced airing in the United States on October 3, 2004, concluded May 22, 2005, and consisted of 23 episodes. It tells the story of Mary Alice Young, a seemingly perfect housewife who commits suicide, fearing that a dark secret involving her, her husband, and their son would be exposed. At her wake, Mary Alice's four close friends and the main characters, Susan Mayer, Lynette Scavo, Bree Van de Kamp and Gabrielle Solis, are introduced. All of them live in the suburb of Fairview on Wisteria Lane. Narrating the series from beyond the grave, Mary Alice describes how her friends try to discover the reason for her suicide while dealing with the problems of their own personal lives.

Desperate Housewives' first season aired in the United States (U.S.) on Sundays at 9:00 pm ET on ABC, a terrestrial television network. In addition to the 23 regular episodes, a special, Sorting Out the Dirty Laundry, aired on April 24, 2005. The season garnered an average of 23.7 million viewers in the U.S. per all 23 episodes, ranking as the fourth most-watched television series during the 2004–05 American television season. In the United Kingdom, the season premiered on Channel 4 on January 5, 2005, and subsequently aired Wednesdays at 10 pm on the network. It aired in Canada on CTV Television Network and in Australia on the Seven Network.

The season was released on DVD as a six-disc box set under the title of Desperate Housewives – The Complete First Season on September 20, 2005, by Buena Vista Home Entertainment in Region 1, in Region 2 on October 10, 2005, and in Region 4 on November 28, 2005. The season is also available for purchase by registered users on the U.S. iTunes Store.

== Production ==
Desperate Housewives was filmed at the backlot Colonial Street. This map depicts the locations of the houses of the characters in the series.

Marc Cherry wrote the script for the Housewives pilot and his agent shopped it to six networks (CBS, NBC, Fox, HBO, Showtime and Lifetime), only to have all of them turn it down. Later, after his previous agent was arrested for embezzlement, he hired a team of new agents, who saw the script "as a soap opera with dark comedy in it". After Cherry edited parts of the pilot script and pitched it to ABC, network executives were impressed, causing ABC to order 13 episodes. Filming for the season started around March 2004 at the Universal Studios Hollywood backlot Colonial Street.

This season was produced by Touchstone Television (now ABC Studios) and Cherry Productions and aired on the ABC network. The executive producers were Cherry, Michael Edelstein, Charles Pratt Jr., and Tom Spezialy with Pratt Jr., Chris Black, Oliver Goldstick, Joey Murphy, and John Pardee serving as consulting producers. The staff writers were Cherry, Goldstick, Spezialy, Pardee, Murphy, and Black; producers Alexandra Cunningham, Tracey Stern, and Patty Lin; co-executive producer Kevin Murphy, Jenna Bans, David Schulner, Adam Barr, Katie Ford, and Joshua Senter. Regular directors throughout the season included Charles McDougall, Arlene Sanford, Larry Shaw, Jeff Melman, Fred Gerber, David Grossman, and John David Coles. Its orchestral score was composed by Steve Bartek and Steve Jablonsky, while the series' theme was composed by Danny Elfman. Cherry also served as the season's show runner.

== Cast ==
=== Regular cast ===
==== Starring ====
- Teri Hatcher as Susan Mayer
- Felicity Huffman as Lynette Scavo
- Marcia Cross as Bree Van de Kamp
- Eva Longoria as Gabrielle Solis
- Nicollette Sheridan as Edie Britt
- Steven Culp as Rex Van de Kamp
- Ricardo Antonio Chavira as Carlos Solis
- Mark Moses as Paul Young
- Andrea Bowen as Julie Mayer
- Jesse Metcalfe as John Rowland
- Cody Kasch as Zach Young
- Brenda Strong as Mary Alice Young
- James Denton as Mike Delfino

=== Recurring ===
- Brent Kinsman as Preston Scavo
- Shane Kinsman as Porter Scavo
- Doug Savant as Tom Scavo
- Zane Huett as Parker Scavo
- Joy Lauren as Danielle Van de Kamp
- Shawn Pyfrom as Andrew Van de Kamp
- Harriet Sansom Harris as Felicia Tilman
- Christine Estabrook as Martha Huber
- Roger Bart as George Williams
- Lupe Ontiveros as Juanita "Mama" Solis
- Lucille Soong as Yao Lin
- Ryan Carnes as Justin
- Marla Sokoloff as Claire
- Bob Gunton as Noah Taylor
- Sam Lloyd as Dr. Albert Goldfine
- Richard Roundtree as Mr. Shaw
- Pat Crawford Brown as Ida Greenberg
- Lesley Ann Warren as Sophie Bremmer
- Richard Burgi as Karl Mayer
- Jeff Doucette as Father Crowley

=== Guest ===
- Terry Bozeman as Dr. Lee Craig
- Mehcad Brooks as Matthew Applewhite
- Nick Chinlund as Detective Sullivan
- Kathryn Joosten as Karen McCluskey
- Alfre Woodard as Betty Applewhite

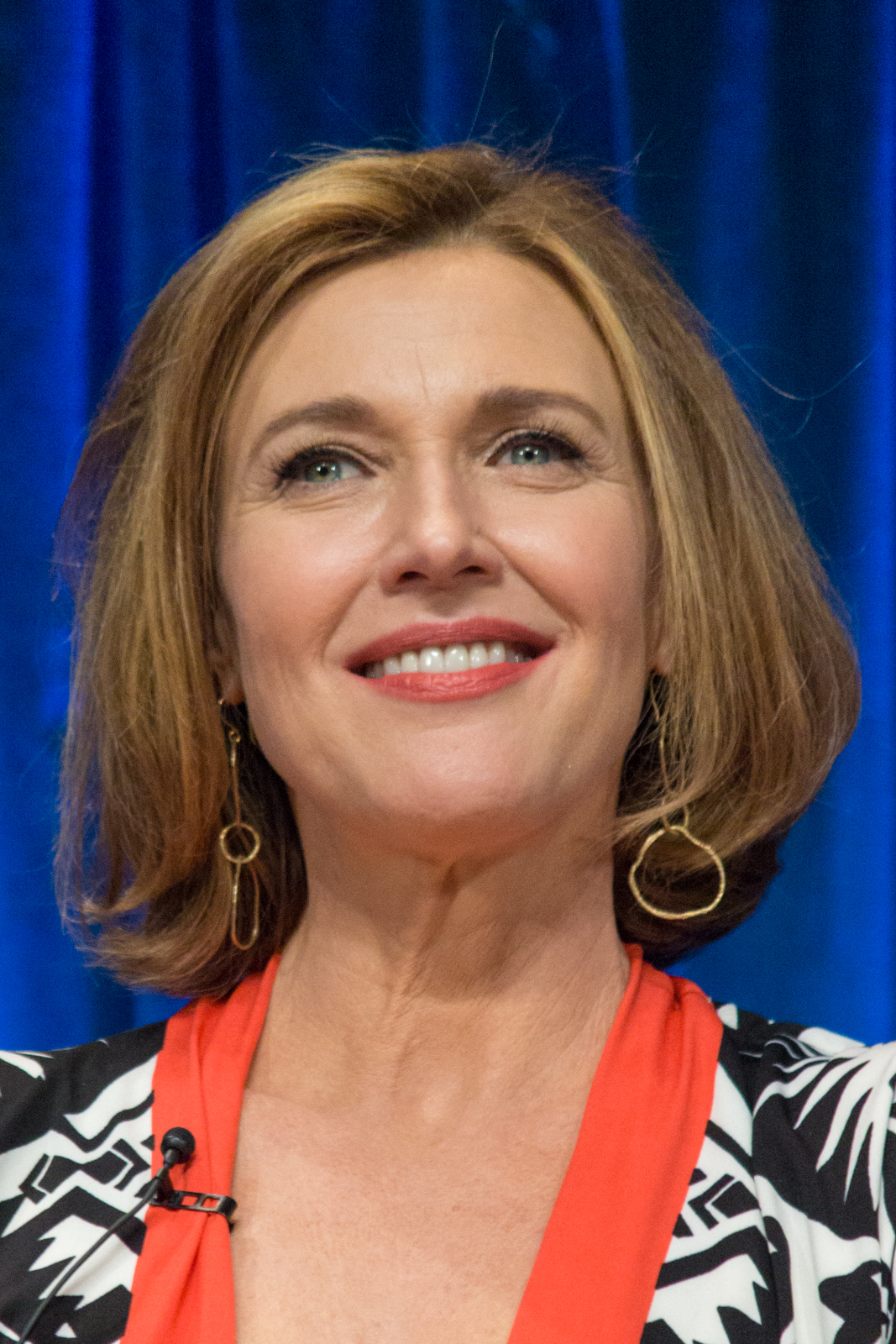
Strong's character is the series' narrator, whose suicide in the pilot episode was the subject of the season's main mystery

The first season features a cast of thirteen actors who receive star billing. Brenda Strong narrated the series as the deceased Mary Alice Young. Teri Hatcher portrayed Susan Mayer, the klutzy, lovable divorced mother in search of love. Felicity Huffman played Lynette Scavo, a former career woman who is now a full-time mother of four. Marcia Cross acted as Bree Van de Kamp, the uptight, perfectionist homemaker and mother of two teenagers who is struggling to save her marriage. Eva Longoria starred as Gabrielle Solis, the materialistic ex–fashion model who cheats on her husband. Nicollette Sheridan played the neighborhood slut and Susan's rival, Edie Britt. Steven Culp played Rex Van de Kamp, Bree's emasculated, sexually dissatisfied husband. Ricardo Antonio Chavira starred as Gabrielle's neglectful, high-powered executive husband, Carlos Solis. Mark Moses portrayed Mary Alice's mysterious widower, Paul Young. Andrea Bowen played Susan's knowledgeable, level-headed daughter, Julie Mayer. Jesse Metcalfe played the Solis' gardener and Gabrielle's adulterous lover, John Rowland. Cody Kasch played Mary Alice's and Paul's troubled and mentally unstable son Zach Young, and James Denton portrayed the neighborhood plumber and Susan's love interest, Mike Delfino, who has a secret of his own.

Numerous supporting characters have been given expansive and recurring appearances in the progressive storyline. Doug Savant played Tom Scavo, Lynette's husband who is often away on business; Savant later became a series regular. Shawn Pyfrom appeared as Bree and Rex's rebellious and headstrong son Andrew Van de Kamp. Kathryn Joosten acted as Karen McCluskey, Lynette's neighbor across the street, and Christine Estabrook portrayed the neighborhood busybody Martha Huber.

== Reception ==
=== Viewership and reviews ===
The pilot episode, which aired on October 3, 2004, garnered 21.6 million viewers, ranking first in its time slot of 9:00 pm Eastern Time Zone (ET) (8:00 pm Central Time Zone (Americas) [CT]). It was the most-viewed ABC season premiere since 1996's Spin City. After airing three episodes of Desperate Housewives, ABC picked the series up for a full season. Overall, the first season averaged 23.7 million viewers for the 23 episodes aired in the U.S., including the season's largest audience of more than 30 million viewers of the season finale. Of the regular primetime programming that aired during the 2004–2005 American television season, Desperate Housewives ranked 4th out of 156 programs, according to the Nielsen Ratings system. In terms of a Ratings share, Desperate Housewives ranked 3rd in the 2004-2005 TV Season, coming behind the two separate airing spots of American Idol. It also ranked as the highest ABC Network Programme. And the highest ranking Drama, Comedy and Dramady Programme.

"As involving as any new drama and funnier than any new sitcom, Housewives matches high visual style with a witty-but-never arch sensibility."

— Robert Bianco of USA Today.

Critical reception was overwhelmingly positive, and Housewives was considered the breakout hit of the season. Robert Bianco of USA Today gave the pilot a score of four stars out of four, calling it "[r]efreshingly original, bracingly adult and thoroughly delightful", and going on to say that "[Desperate] Housewives is a brightly colored, darkly comic take on suburban life, sort of Knots Landing meets The Golden Girls by way of Twin Peaks." Tim Goodman of the San Francisco Chronicle thought that Desperate Housewives was "a brilliantly conceived and relentlessly entertaining new drama". Matthew Gilbert of The Boston Globe commented that the series had "marvelous tonal elasticity". Peter Schorn of IGN felt that season one was "blessed with an attractive cast (sing the praises of older women!), sharp writing and a funky vibe of its own" and that "Desperate Housewives was able to take some of the oldest formulas in the book and infuse them with their own subversive twists to whip up a frothy confection of sly wit and dark motives." Schorn gave the season a score of 9 out of 10.

Some critics were not as enthusiastic, however. On reviewing the DVD release of the season, Entertainment Weekly's Dalton Ross gave it a B+ grade, selecting the pilot, "Who's That Woman?", "Guilty", "Children Will Listen" and the season finale "One Wonderful Day" as the season's best episodes, and "Suspicious Minds", "Your Fault" and "Love is in the Air" as the season's worst. Heather Havrilesky of Salon.com felt that after a few episodes, "this dark exploration of the lives of women has not only slid quickly into clichés, but the acting feels forced and overplayed, the stories are wildly unrealistic, the direction is stuck in some awkward nowhereland between campy and leaden, and the voice-over is so grating and so peskily imitative of Sex and the City that the whole package is almost unwatchable."

=== Awards ===
Season one was nominated for fifteen Primetime Emmy Awards, winning six. They were in the categories of Outstanding Single-Camera Picture Editing for a Comedy Series, Outstanding Main Title Theme Music which was awarded Danny Elfman, Outstanding Lead Actress in a Comedy Series which was awarded to Felicity Huffman for her portrayal of Lynette Scavo, Outstanding Guest Actress in a Comedy Series which was awarded to Kathryn Joosten for her portrayal of Mrs. McCluskey, Outstanding Directing for a Comedy Series which was awarded to Charles McDougall and Outstanding Casting for a Comedy Series. Teri Hatcher picked up a Golden Globe Award in the category of Best Performance by an Actress in a Television Series – Musical or Comedy for her portrayal of Susan Mayer. The season received four other Golden Globe nominations, winning one for Best Television Series – Musical or Comedy. The season also won two Screen Actors Guild Awards; one was awarded to Teri Hatcher in the category Outstanding Performance by a Female Actor in a Comedy Series and the other was under the category of Outstanding Performance by an Ensemble in a Comedy Series.

== Episodes ==
No. overall	No. in season	Title	Directed by	Written by	Original release date	U.S. viewers (millions)
1	1	"Pilot"	Charles McDougall	Marc Cherry	October 3, 2004	21.65
One day in the suburb of Wisteria Lane, residents are shaken up by the sudden suicide of Mary Alice Young. At her wake, her four close friends and the main characters, Susan Mayer, Lynette Scavo, Bree Van de Kamp and Gabrielle Solis, are introduced. All of them lead seemingly perfect lives, trying to keep their problems from each other. Susan and Edie Britt fight over the new neighborhood resident and plumber Mike Delfino. Lynette's children cause a ruckus in the Youngs' pool, putting her in an embarrassing position. Gabrielle is having an affair with her teenage gardener John Rowland, because she is neglected and treated condescendingly by her busy husband, Carlos. Bree's husband Rex collapses from an allergic reaction at a diner, shortly after asking her for a divorce. Susan accidentally burns Edie's house down after going over to see if she was with Mike. While the ladies put away Mary Alice's belongings, they discover a mysterious blackmail note addressed to her, leaving them to wonder what she had done.
2	2	"Ah, But Underneath"	Larry Shaw	Marc Cherry	October 10, 2004	20.03
The ladies contemplate telling Mary Alice's husband Paul about the blackmail note, while he retrieves a mysterious toy chest from underneath his pool. Gabrielle suspects Carlos is catching onto her affair, and that John may be falling in love with her. Bree suggests to Rex that they should enroll in marriage counselling; Rex blames Bree for their marital problems in their first counselling session with Dr. Goldfine. While helping Edie salvage her belongings, Wisteria Lane resident Martha Huber finds a piece of evidence that might implicate Susan: her measuring cup. Edie and Susan continue to fight over Mike's affections as he invites both of them over for dinner, which turns awry when Mike's dog accidentally swallows Susan's earring. Frustrated by her children's behavior, Lynette resorts to an extreme discipline technique, which ultimately backfires. Paul throws the toy chest into the town lake.
3	3	"Pretty Little Picture"	Arlene Sanford	Oliver Goldstick	October 17, 2004	20.87
At Susan's urging, the ladies decide to throw a dinner party in Mary Alice's honor. Lynette's husband Tom volunteers to babysit the kids while she is at the party. Meanwhile, Mary Alice's son, Zach, finds the revolver his mother used to kill herself. A little girl catches Gabrielle kissing John and blackmails her into buying her gifts. Susan calls her ex-husband Karl over to talk about their problems, which eventually results in her locking herself out of her house naked. Dr. Goldfine suggests private sessions for the Van de Kamps, at the reluctance of Bree. At the party, Rex tells everyone about their marriage counselling sessions. Angered, Bree humiliates him in front of the others, causing Rex to move out on her. Susan tells Karl that she is over him, with his lover Brandi apologizing to her about her involvement in ending their marriage. Bree raids Dr Goldfine's tapes to find out what Rex had said in his session, and finds a tape with Mary Alice's name instead. Paul puts up the Youngs' house for sale.
4	4	"Who's That Woman?"	Jeff Melman	Marc Cherry & Tom Spezialy	October 24, 2004	21.49
The housewives listen to Mary Alice's session tape and find out about her real name, Angela. Lynette denies that her twins have attention deficit disorder, but proposes a solution by asking for them to be separated. Edie attempts to arouse Mike by seductively washing her car, but Susan ultimately wins him over when he asks her out. Martha Huber uses Susan's measuring cup as her involvement in Edie's house fire to blackmail her, causing Susan to compromise her relationship with Mike. Susan gets her daughter, Julie, to sneak into Martha's house and retrieve the cup. Carlos becomes suspicious that Gabrielle is cheating on him, but goes after the wrong man. Bree struggles with her rebellious son, Andrew, who is angry about Rex moving out. After the ladies finally tell Paul about the blackmail note, he hires a private investigator named Mr. Shaw to track down who sent it.
5	5	"Come In, Stranger"	Arlene Sanford	Alexandra Cunningham	October 31, 2004	22.14
A break-in at Wisteria Lane causes distress among the neighbors. Susan is asked out on a date by a police officer, which she accepts after Mike acts coldly towards her. Unknown to the residents, Mike is revealed to be the burglar, as he left his screwdriver behind. Gabrielle's mother-in-law, Juanita, arrives after being called by Carlos, who wanted her to help him find out if Gabrielle is cheating on him. Lynette and Tom consider enrolling the twins into Barcliff Academy, a private school. Lynette tries to tire them out so that they will appear docile when they are brought in for observation. As Rex takes the children away for the weekend, Bree bonds with Zach after inviting him over for dinner, and he reveals to her that he may know why his mother killed herself.
6	6	"Running to Stand Still"	Fred Gerber	Tracey Stern	November 7, 2004	24.60
The housewives discuss the sudden disappearance of Zach, who is later revealed to have been checked into a juvenile rehabilitation facility by Paul. Carlos, with his mother's help, becomes desperate to find out with whom Gabrielle is having an affair. Lynette argues with another mother named Maisy Gibbons at Barcliff Academy about her decision to make a "politically correct" play about Little Red Riding Hood. Gabrielle worries that John may be losing interest in her when she sees him with Bree's daughter, Danielle. Dr. Goldfine suggests that the Van de Kamps hire a "sex surrogate", much to Bree's disbelief. Gabrielle takes advantage of Juanita's gambling problem to spend more time with John. Lynette takes some of the twins' ADD medication to help her prepare the costumes for the play. As Susan investigates more into the mystery surrounding the Young family, Julie helps by breaking into Zach's ward, where he mentions the name "Dana".
7	7	"Anything You Can Do"	Larry Shaw	John Pardee & Joey Murphy	November 21, 2004	24.21
Susan tells the other housewives about the name "Dana". Juanita discovers that Gabrielle is seeing John and becomes more determined to catch them together. Paul suspects Edie might have sent the blackmail note to his wife. Lynette steadily becomes more dependent on the twin's medication. Rex reveals to Bree that he has filed for a divorce and tries to win over the children with gifts. Mike has an unexpected house guest named Kendra, causing him to cancel his date with Susan. Unknown to her, Kendra was sent by her father, who has hired Mike to find her missing sister. Gabrielle offers Danielle a modeling job in New York City as an effort to get her away from John. Lynette sabotages Tom's promotion while under the influence of the medication. An intoxicated Andrew runs over Juanita, moments after she photographed John and Gabrielle having sex.
8	8	"Guilty"	Fred Gerber	Kevin Murphy	November 28, 2004	27.24
Bree discovers that Andrew's drunk driving has put Juanita in a coma, and she and Rex try to save him from prosecution by covering up the crime. Later, Bree is shocked when Andrew shows no remorse for what he has done. Meanwhile, John tells Gabrielle that he confessed their affair to a priest. Susan decides to find out the real reason Mike has moved to Wisteria Lane. She watches Mike's house while he is away and discovers a gun and a few wads of cash, but later gets stuck in his bathroom floor. When Mike finds her along with his things, he realizes Susan cannot trust him and breaks up with her. Lynette reaches the breaking point of her addiction to the ADD pills and comes clean about it to Bree and Susan. After a confrontation with Edie, Mr. Shaw learns that Martha Huber was Mary Alice's blackmailer. Mike makes up with Susan and they have sex for the first time, while Paul confronts and bludgeons to death the remorseless Martha Huber with a blender for her involvement in Mary Alice's suicide.
9	9	"Suspicious Minds"	Larry Shaw	Jenna Bans	December 12, 2004	21.56
Gabrielle decides to hold a charity fashion show on the street. While looking for dresses, the women discuss the sudden disappearance of Martha, while Paul buries her in a forest. Lynette uses her business skills to "poach" herself a nanny. Bree and Rex try to figure out the best way to punish Andrew when he continues to show no guilt after putting Juanita in a coma, and for finding marijuana in his room. Meanwhile, Susan confronts Gabrielle after finding out about her and John, forcing her to come clean. John's mother, Helen, also finds out that he is seeing a housewife; however, she assumes it is Susan. Paul is told that Zach has escaped from the mental institution, only to be found in Julie's room. After Susan is humiliated at the fashion show by Helen, Gabrielle finally tells her about the affair. Carlos is arrested, claiming he was "set up" by his business partner.
10	10	"Come Back to Me"	Fred Gerber	Patty Lin	December 19, 2004	22.34
Maisy Gibbons returns, and her secret life of being the neighborhood prostitute intersects with Bree's, when she finds out Rex has been seeing her after he has a heart attack. Gabrielle has a financial downturn after Carlos is sentenced for importing goods manufactured by slave labor, and she resorts to stashing her belongings in Bree's garage after her car is repossessed. Edie becomes suspicious of Martha's whereabouts. A jealous Lynette videotapes her new nanny Claire, fearing that she is getting along too well with her kids. Susan and Mike discover that Zach is being taken care of by Julie, after they find him sneaking around the house. Julie feels that Susan has betrayed her when they send Zach back to his father.
11	11	"Move On"	John David Coles	David Schulner	January 9, 2005	25.20
Edie organizes a neighborhood search for Martha Huber, while her sinister sister Felicia Tillman comes to Wisteria Lane to investigate her disappearance. Now separated from Rex, Bree asks the local pharmacist George Williams out on a date, much to Rex's envy. Mike fears that Susan may be still in love with Karl. Paul plants Martha's stolen jewelry in Mike's garage, fearing that the police may discover his secret. After accidentally seeing Claire sneaking around the house naked, Tom is aroused and has sex with Lynette. When Lynette finds out about the incident, she fires Claire. Gabrielle, desperate for money, decides to return to modelling. At the end of the episode, a man jogging with his dog discovers Martha's body buried in the woods.
12	12	"Every Day a Little Death"	David Grossman	Chris Black	January 16, 2005	24.09
The residents of Wisteria Lane finally discover Martha Huber's body. After finding out that she left behind a journal, Susan confesses to Edie about burning down her house as a last resort; Edie is enraged and dumps Martha's ashes all over Susan. When Bree and George go shooting, George attempts to kiss Bree, but ends up shooting himself in the foot. Lynette enrolls in a yoga class, but has problems putting her children into the day care center. Carlos is released on bail, but to Gabrielle's discontent, he cannot resume working due to being under house arrest. Mike's reason for moving to Wisteria Lane is revealed when he meets with Noah Taylor, his employer, who wants him to find "Deirdre", who has been missing for more than 10 years.
13	13	"Your Fault"	Arlene Sanford	Kevin Etten	January 23, 2005	25.95
When Lynette's father-in-law Rodney Scavo visits, she learns that he has been cheating on his wife and that Tom has known about it. Susan dislikes Julie's growing romance towards Zach, and decides to chaperone the school dance to watch over them. Paul ensures that Susan does not know too much about the secret surrounding the Youngs. Bree ignores Rex's attempts to resolve things, while their divorce lawyers sort out their possessions, claiming she wants "revenge" for him cheating on her. Gabrielle is approached by John's parents, who ask her to convince him to go to college, as he is already 18. John, however, plans to leave home and proposes marriage to Gabrielle, which she declines, claiming she still loves Carlos.
14	14	"Love Is in the Air"	Jeff Melman	Tom Spezialy	February 13, 2005	22.30
Susan looks forward to a romantic Valentine's Day with Mike. Mike, however, gets himself shot while breaking into a house searching for answers about "Deirdre". Bree reconciles her relationship with Rex, saying that she is ready to work on improving their marriage and sex life, but she is shocked when he reveals his interests in S&M. Lynette's neighbor across the street, Mrs. McCluskey, complains that her boys have been stealing from her. Gabrielle continues to look for work at a mattress store, and at a cosmetics department. Felicia stumbles upon a clue to the Young family's past when she recognizes Mary Alice in a photo as a Utah hospital nurse by her real name, Angela. Lynette shows Susan a piece of Martha Huber's jewelry that her boys stole from Mike's garage, arousing Susan's suspicion that Mike might have killed her.
15	15	"Impossible"	Larry Shaw	Marc Cherry & Tom Spezialy	February 20, 2005	24.19
Mike is arrested for the murder of Martha Huber. Susan bails him out by telling the police that they were together on the night of the murder, but is later heartbroken when she discovers his criminal record and soon breaks up with him. John's roommate Justin tries to blackmail Gabrielle into having sex with him by becoming their new gardener. Tom has a promotion as vice president of his company, but Lynette discourages him from taking it, fearing that she will have to look after her wild children for longer hours. After finding a condom in the laundry, Bree discovers that Danielle is planning to lose her virginity to John, and persuades him to break up with her. While Zach is throwing a pool party for the neighborhood teenagers, Julie is disturbed by his sadistic mentality and ends their relationship. Susan discovers Andrew and Justin making out in the pool, forcing Andrew to exclaim that he is not gay.
16	16	"The Ladies Who Lunch"	Arlene Sanford	Alexandra Cunningham	March 27, 2005	24.08
When Maisy Gibbons is arrested for solicitation, Bree attempts to bribe her to remove Rex's name from her book of clients before it goes public. Gabrielle and Carlos face a sewage disaster but can't afford to fix it. Lynette tries to defend her twins when they are suspected for a head lice outbreak at Barcliff Academy. She discovers, however, that the outbreak was caused by another student and tries to get his mother to stop spreading rumors about her twins. Depressed over her break-up with Mike, Susan bonds with Edie. She confides in her grief with Edie and suggests to her they break into Paul's house to find evidence about his involvement in Martha Huber's murder.
17	17	"There Won't Be Trumpets"	Jeff Melman	John Pardee & Joey Murphy	April 3, 2005	24.61
Juanita Solis finally awakens from her coma, but dies after falling down the stairs before she could reveal Gabrielle's affair with John to Carlos. The residents attend Juanita's funeral, where Gabrielle argues with Carlos about getting his mother a huge, expensive crypt. Gabrielle also finds out that the hospital was negligent in her mother-in-law's death and in return, they offer her a seven-figure settlement. Lynette befriends a deaf woman named Alisa Stevens, whose daughter also attends Barcliff Academy, but is infuriated by her husband, who takes advantage of her disability to insult her behind her back. After a series of violent outbursts by Andrew, Bree and Rex contemplate putting him in Camp Hennessy, a teenage rehabilitation camp. Susan finds herself attracted to Edie's new contractor, but Edie prevents her from dating him. Mike tries to explain his past by giving Susan a confession letter, which she hesitates to read.
18	18	"Children Will Listen"	Larry Shaw	Kevin Murphy	April 10, 2005	25.55
Susan's eccentric mother, Sophie Bremmer, pays an unexpected visit after she and her boyfriend, Morty, break up. The police find the toy chest Paul threw into the lake, with the remains of a body inside it. When questioned about the chest, Zach defends his father. After finding out about the hospital settlement check, Carlos physically forces Gabrielle to sign a post-nuptial agreement as he prepares to serve his prison sentence. As a result, Gabrielle goes back to John. Lynette's close friendship with Bree is tested after Bree spanks Porter while babysitting Lynette's children. Rex and Bree visit Andrew at Camp Hennessy, where he reveals that he might be gay. Felicia tells Zach more sinister details about his family's past, and he discovers that "Dana" was his birth name.
19	19	"Live Alone and Like It"	Arlene Sanford	Jenna Bans	April 17, 2005	25.27
Lynette befriends Mrs. McCluskey after saving her from a collapse. However, she starts to regret it when Mrs. McCluskey does not leave her alone. Bree struggles to cope with Andrew's sexual orientation as he comes home from Camp Hennessy. At his mother's request, Andrew consults with a priest, to whom he reveals his sadistic ideas to emotionally destroy his mother. Mike discovers from Noah Taylor that the remains inside Paul Young's toy chest were Deirdre's. Gabrielle resumes her affair with John after being financially declined by Carlos. Sophie decides to get dates for her and Susan, as an effort to help her daughter get over Mike, who gets beaten up by a corrupt detective. Carlos finally decides to tear up the post-nup, and regains Gabrielle's respect.
20	20	"Fear No More"	Jeff Melman	Adam Barr	May 1, 2005	25.69
Gabrielle plans a "farewell party" for Carlos, who is about to serve his eight-month jail sentence, but she later retaliates in rage after discovering that she is pregnant after he tampered with her birth control pills. George Williams returns and tries to steal Bree away from Rex. Bree is unaware that George has an ulterior motive. Lynette is jealous when an ex-girlfriend of Tom's is now working in his company and asks Edie for advice. Zach starts stalking Julie in order to resolve their relationship. Edie blames Susan when Paul questions her about breaking into his house, causing him to lie to Susan and fabricate a false history about Mary Alice, which she does not believe. When Susan's kitchen catches fire, she blames Paul as the arsonist. After finding out about the toy chest and who it belonged to, Mike decides to investigate Paul and tells the already suspicious Susan to stay away from him.
21	21	"Sunday in the Park with George"	Larry Shaw	Katie Ford	May 8, 2005	26.10
Edie spies on Bree having dinner with George and confronts her about it, making her feel guilty about being close with him. Rex's health starts to deteriorate after George tampers with his heart medication. Lynette tries to revitalize her sex life with Tom, whom she fears is losing interest due to his busy work schedule. Susan hires Mr. Shaw to investigate the Young family, unaware that he is already working for Paul. After confronting Noah Taylor, Susan learns that Mike shot a police officer in self-defense and decides to forgive him. When questioned about the birth control pills, Carlos lies to Gabrielle and claims that his mother tampered with them. Gabrielle tells John about her pregnancy, making him worry that he may be the father. Sophie's boyfriend Morty proposes marriage to her and asks her to move out, which relieves Susan from taking care of her. Felicia plots to drive Paul out of the neighborhood, to help Zach know the truth about his family.
22	22	"Goodbye for Now"	David Grossman	Josh Senter	May 15, 2005	25.28
Edie is annoyed when Susan and Mike move in together, and tries to intervene via the other wives. Lynette tries to keep Tom's ex-girlfriend Annabel from coming between them, and her actions result in him losing his job. George lies to Bree about information he finds regarding her and Rex's sex life, and when Bree confronts Rex about it, he has another heart attack. Carlos' prison sentence is increased to eight years after he beats up Justin, thinking that he is the one having an affair with his wife, while Gabrielle decides to leave Carlos after discovering he was really the one who tampered with her pills. Mike pursues Paul after Felicia gives him Martha Huber's journal detailing Mary Alice's past and about what happened to Deirdre, and Susan decides to follow him. Felicia takes Zach into her home, while Martha Huber's journal lands in the hands of Susan and Julie. Betty Applewhite moves into Wisteria Lane with her adolescent son, Matthew, in the middle of the night.
23	23	"One Wonderful Day"	Larry Shaw	John Pardee & Joey Murphy & Marc Cherry & Tom Spezialy & Kevin Murphy	May 22, 2005	30.62
Flashbacks reveal that Deirdre, a drug addict, sold her baby to Todd and Angela Forrest, after which the couple moved to Wisteria Lane, changing their names to Paul and Mary Alice Young. Sometime later, a sober Deirdre tracked down the Youngs to take her son back, but Mary Alice stabbed and killed Deirdre to prevent her from taking Zach; the Youngs then buried Deirdre's body beneath their pool. In the present, Mike brings Paul to a desert quarry and interrogates him about killing Deirdre. Upon learning that Mike intends to kill Paul, Zach attacks Felicia and breaks into Mike's house; he runs into Susan and holds her at gunpoint. Tom finds out through his boss that Lynette tried to get him fired, and decides to be a stay-at-home dad, telling Lynette that it is now her turn to work for the family. When Carlos is being tried in court for assaulting Justin, John finally tells him that he was the one having an affair with Gabrielle. Rex begins to think that the reason for his deteriorating health is that Bree had poisoned him. He writes her a note saying that he understands and forgives her, and dies from a heart attack a few minutes later.

== DVD release ==
The Complete First Season of Desperate Housewives was released as a 6-disc DVD set for Region 1 on September 20, 2005. This release included all 23 uncut season one episodes with some of them also being extended, audio commentaries by creator Marc Cherry and the housewives, deleted scenes, behind-the-scenes featurettes, a special skit for the series featuring Oprah and so much more bonus features. For Target stores in the United States, some select sets had a bonus disc attached that included a 23-minute special episode titled "Sorting Out the Dirty Laundry" that recapped the entire season; for Walmart stores, some sets had a bonus disc attached that included a preview of the ABC programming for the fall of the 2005 television season.

Desperate Housewives: The Complete First Season
Set details	Special features	
23 Episodes (6 extended); 6-Disc Set; 1.78:1 aspect ratio; English (Dolby Digital 5.1 Surround); English SDH subtitles; Runtime: 1007 minutes; Audio Commentaries	6 Extended Episodes: "Who's That Woman"; "Anything You Can Do"; "Every Day a Little Death"; "Impossible"; "Sunday in the Park with George"; "Goodbye for Now"; Audio Commentaries on 5 episodes: "Pilot" & "Guilty" by creator Marc Cherry; "Anything You Can Do", "Impossible" & "One Wonderful Day" by Marc Cherry and director Larry Shaw; Deleted Scenes; Individual Audio Commentaries on the deleted scenes by Marc Cherry; Behind The Scenes Of Desperate Housewives with 'The View's' Meredith Viera; A Stroll Down Wisteria Lane with Creator Marc Cherry; Desperate Housewives Around The World; Multi-Language Sequence: Bree's Dinner Party; Dressing Wisteria Lane - A look at the costume and set design; Easter Egg: Jesse Metcalfe's Butt Cheek Controversy; The Ladie's Favourite Scenes - The actresses pick their favorite scenes for the season with individual audio commentaries by each 'housewife'; Secrets Of Wisteria Lane; Bloopers From The Set; Oprah Is The New Neighbour	
DVD release dates
Region 1	Region 2	Region 4
September 20, 2005	October 10, 2005	November 28, 2005
