= Sub-internship =

Year of medical school in USA

A sub-internship (abbreviated sub-I) or acting internship (AI) is a clinical rotation of a fourth-year medical student in the United States medical education system, which typically takes place at their home hospital but may also be done at a different hospital than the student's medical school affiliation.

== Process ==
A student will generally select an elective "sub"-internship, during which the student will perform the role of an intern or first-year medical graduate, under the supervision of senior house staff and attending physicians. The rotation is generally pursued in the field appropriate to career interest. For example, a sub-I can be taken in internal medicine, surgery, pediatrics, or obstetrics and gynecology. In this way, the student can experience a glimpse of their future career without the burden of full responsibility. Additionally, many medical students select sub-internships at institutions where they wish to apply for residency; such rotations are "auditions" for the student to demonstrate their commitment to the outside program.

== Responsibilities ==
At the turn of the 21st century, ninety-eight percent of US medical schools offered an internal medicine sub-I to medical students. In general, the following responsibilities are given to a sub-I student: accept and give sign-out of all patients on the team, assess assigned patients before morning rounds, write problem-oriented notes daily on all patients, admit patients on call days, act as information liaison between the medical team and hospital staff, communicating plan of care to the patient. Responsibilities that are generally limited or withheld include: writing orders or prescriptions, performing major procedures, and obtaining consent from patients for procedures or surgeries.

A recent editorial highlighted the changing role of the subinternship (SI) in the medical school curriculum. It has been argued that the SI should be viewed as the culmination of a coordinated 4-year program of study in clinical care, with an aim to prepare fourth-year students for the demanding experience of internship. Ideally, the educational goals of the SI should complement and expand upon those outlined in the third-year clerkship and ought to uniquely emphasize the knowledge and skills needed to independently treat and manage acutely ill inpatients. To facilitate these goals, it has been recommended that SI programs place fourth-year students in a role that completely replaces the intern, albeit under the supervision of senior house staff. In particular, it has been recommended that subinterns should:

- have a dedicated coordinator of educational activities
- be provided with an explicit set of learning objectives
- have separate conferences which focus on patient management issues
- be able to write medical orders that are cosigned by a physician
- participate in supervised cross-coverage

== Evaluation ==
Despite the valuable and distinctive experience of the SI, it has been neglected by medical educators and researchers as an area needing development and standardization. At an organizational level, the SI currently lacks the clearly defined curricular goals and rigorous evaluation methodologies found in the third-year clerkship. Nevertheless, it is unclear to what extent individual medical schools have addressed the unique educational needs of the SI. In an attempt to clarify the structure and requirements of internal medicine SI programs throughout the United States, a survey study was undertaken.
