= Jake Borelli =

American actor (born 1991)

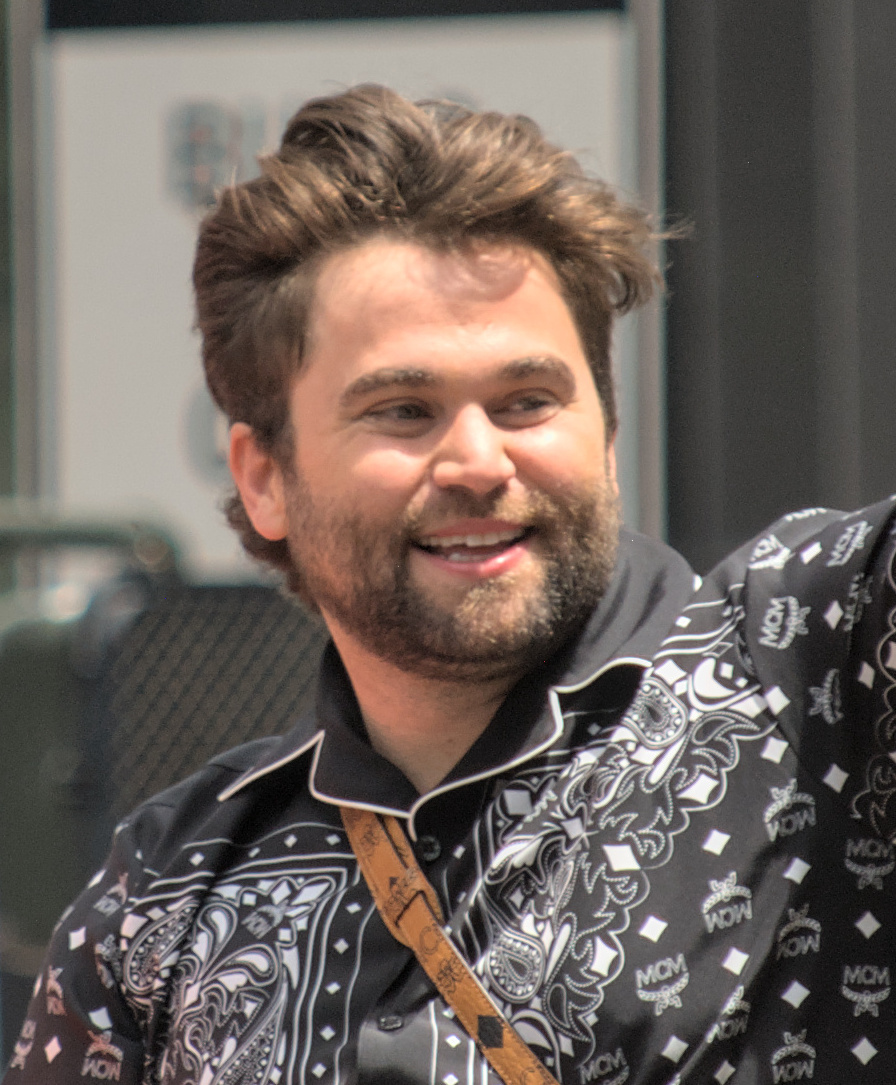
- Borelli at the 2023 San Francisco Pride Parade
- Born: May 13, 1991 (age 35); Columbus, Ohio, U.S.
- Occupation: Actor
- Years active: 2007–present

Jake Borelli (born May 13, 1991) is an American actor and director. He is known for his roles as Wolfgang on the Nickelodeon comedy series The Thundermans (2015–2018) and Dr. Levi Schmitt on the ABC medical drama Grey's Anatomy (2017–2025).

== Early life ==
Borelli was born in Columbus, Ohio, to Linda Borelli and Mike Borelli. He has two older brothers, Ben and Zack. He enjoys painting, art and considered attending art school when he won a national art competition during his senior year of high school. In 2009, he graduated from Upper Arlington High School and was accepted to University of California, Los Angeles and Ohio State University but decided to move to Los Angeles to pursue acting. While in Columbus, Borelli also performed in more than a dozen shows with the Columbus Children's Theatre which included roles in Cheaper by the Dozen; The Lion, The Witch and The Wardrobe; Wiley and the Hairy Man; and Holes.

== Personal life ==
Borelli publicly came out as gay on his personal Instagram in November 2018, moments after the airing of the sixth episode of Grey's Anatomy's fifteenth season, in which his character, Dr. Levi Schmitt, also came out.

== Career ==
Upon moving to Los Angeles, Borelli quickly landed supporting roles in television shows such as iCarly, Parenthood, NCIS: Los Angeles, True Jackson, VP, Greek and Suburgatory. He has also appeared in several short films.

In 2017, he landed a role in the Netflix comedy drama film Reality High. That same year, it was announced that Borelli would be playing intern Dr. Levi Schmitt on Grey's Anatomy. His role on Grey's Anatomy ended in 2024 when his character was written off the show after a 124-episode run. He later returned to direct an episode that aired in April 2025.

== Filmography ==
=== Film ===
| Year | Title | Role | Note |
|---|---|---|---|
| 2011 | Elf Employment | Harlan | Short film |
| 2012 | Nesting | Josh | |
| 2015 | Meanamorphosis | Bryce | Short film |
| 2017 | Reality High | Freddie Myers | |
| 2017 | In Searching | Jon | |
| 2019 | A Cohort of Guests | The Guest | Short film |
| 2019 | How's the World Treating You? | Gin | Short film |
| 2020 | The Thing About Harry | Sam Baselli | |
| 2024 | The Thundermans Return | Wolfgang | |

=== Television ===
| Year | Title | Role | Note |
|---|---|---|---|
| 2009 | Psych: Flashback to the Teen Years | Shawn Spencer | Lead role; 3 episodes |
| 2010 | iCarly | Roy | Episode: "iSpace Out" |
| 2010 | The Forgotten | High School Guy | Episode: "Donovan Doe" |
| 2010 | Parenthood | Steve's Friend | Episode: "Team Braverman" |
| 2010 | NCIS: Los Angeles | Stefan Maragos | Episode: "Little Angels" |
| 2010 | True Jackson, VP | Harvey | Episodes: "Class Election" and "Principal for a Day" |
| 2011 | Greek | ΩX Pledge No. 1 | Episodes: "Subclass Plagiostomi" and "Agents for Change" |
| 2011 | Suburgatory | Boy | Episode: "Charity Case" |
| 2012 | CeReality | Josh | Episode: "The Breakfast Table of Terror" |
| 2014 | Gang Related | Andy Schiller | Episode: "Invierno Cayó" |
| 2015–2018 | The Thundermans | Wolfgang | 13 episodes |
| 2016 | NCIS | Dean Campbell | Episode: "React" |
| 2017–2025 | Grey's Anatomy | Dr. Levi Schmitt | 124 episodes |
| 2018 | Grey's Anatomy: B-Team | Dr. Levi Schmitt | ABC webseries; 3 episodes |
| 2018–2021 | Station 19 | Dr. Levi Schmitt | 6 episodes |
