= Rosalind Franklin University of Medicine and Science =

Graduate school in North Chicago, Illinois, US

Coordinates: 42°18′0.6″N 87°51′33.3″W

- Former name: Finch University
- Motto: Life in Discovery (Vita In Inventione)
- Type: Private graduate school
- Established: Predecessors established 1912.
- President: Aron Sousa
- Faculty: 702
- Students: 2,099 (2020–2021)
- Location: North Chicago, Illinois, United States
- Campus: Urban, 97 acres
- Colors: Maroon, Black, and White
- Website: www.rosalindfranklin.edu

The Rosalind Franklin University of Medicine and Science (RFU) is a private graduate school in North Chicago, Illinois. It has more than 2,000 students in six schools: Chicago Medical School, College of Health Professions, College of Nursing, College of Pharmacy, Dr. William M. Scholl College of Podiatric Medicine, and School of Graduate and Postdoctoral Studies. The university is named for famous DNA crystallographer Rosalind Franklin. Photo 51, an X-ray diffraction pattern of the B form of DNA, captured by Franklin in 1952, was pivotal in 20th-century history of biology. The image is depicted in the university's seal and logo.

RFU offers more than 30 graduate programs in health-related subjects, including PhD programs for medical and basic research. Its facilities include the Innovation and Research Park, which is designed to promote collaboration among academic and industry scientists, and Helix 51, the first bioscience incubator in Lake County, Illinois.

== History ==
=== Founding of Chicago Medical School ===
The precursor of RFU, Chicago Hospital-College of Medicine, was founded in Chicago in 1912. A group of physicians and community leaders formed a nonprofit school to serve medical students who could attend only at night. William Dorland, an editor of the well-known medical dictionary bearing his name, was dean of the school for a time.

The school had its most significant development period under the direction of John J. Sheinin, who served as dean and president from 1932 to 1966. The institution successfully met the challenges arising from restructuring American medical education after the Flexner Report, when more than half of all American medical schools merged or closed. In 1930, the school, by then known as Chicago Medical School, moved to what would become one of the world's largest aggregations of medical facilities. Located in downtown Chicago, the complex contained two undergraduate universities, three medical schools, seven hospitals, and colleges of dentistry, pharmacy, and nursing.

=== The Great Depression and World War II ===
From the beginning, Chicago Medical School's leaders rejected quotas to limit minority enrollment, believing that only a student's merit should play a role in the admissions process. Enrollment more than doubled during the Great Depression. The school became a refuge for Jewish researchers and faculty, recruited in great numbers as they fled Nazi Europe beginning in the late 1930s, and continued to provide a haven for refugee physicians from Europe after World War II began.

In 1945, the school put its founding principles into writing when it added a nondiscrimination amendment to its constitution. This amendment declared that admission to the School would be "based solely on academic accomplishment and character merit without discrimination as to race, religion, sex, or national origin.”

=== Formation of the University of Health Sciences ===
In the early 1960s, Sheinin advocated the creation of another university, which would enable medical students across all disciplines to train together and learn to work in teams. This led to the formation of the University of Health Sciences/Chicago Medical School (UHS/CMS) in 1967.

UHS/CMS was one of the first schools in the country committed to developing integrated educational programs for physicians and related health professionals. This educational model, conceived by A. Nichols Taylor, then president of Chicago Medical School, and funded largely through the efforts of board chairman Herman M. Finch, brought together diagnostic, supportive, and investigative functions of medicine in one setting.

The University of Health Sciences added two schools alongside Chicago Medical School: the School of Graduate and Postdoctoral Studies, established in 1968, and the School of Related Health Sciences (now the College of Health Professions), established in 1970.

=== Relocation and renaming ===
In 1980, the university moved from Chicago to its current location at 3333 Green Bay Road in North Chicago. A centerpiece of the campus was and remains the Otto L. and Hazel T. Rhoades Auditorium. The university was renamed in 1993 after its President, becoming the Herman M. Finch University of Health Sciences. The Dr. William M. Scholl College of Podiatric Medicine, founded in 1912, joined Finch University in 2001.

In October 2002, the university opened its new Health Sciences Building, a 140,000-square-foot (13,000 m^{2}) facility that houses laboratories, auditoriums, classrooms, a student union, a bookstore, and the Feet First Museum. In July 2003, the university opened its first phase of student housing, making the institution a residential campus for the first time in its history. In the summer of 2003, the university completed two new facilities designed to provide students with the latest in medical technology. The Education and Evaluation Center and the John J. Sheinin, M.D., Ph.D., D.Sc., Gross Anatomy Laboratory provide state-of-the-art equipment and multimedia resources by which students participate in their training. These facilities promote the use of integrated technologies and novel approaches to the study of human anatomy, the practice of physical examination, and the art of taking a patient history.

In 2004, the university was again renamed, this time to Rosalind Franklin University of Medicine and Science in honor of Rosalind Franklin, whose work with X-ray diffraction provided the data and scientific basis for the description of the structure of DNA, the single most important advance in modern biology. The name of the School of Related Health Sciences was also changed to the College of Health Professions at this time.

=== Recent expansions ===
In 2011, the university opened its fifth school, the College of Pharmacy, which is housed in the William J. and Elizabeth L. Morningstar Interprofessional Education Center (IPEC). The IPEC, which opened in July 2011, is a three-story, 23,000-square-foot building. The College of Pharmacy graduated its first class in 2015.

The university has seen massive construction projects to its campus in the past few years. The Rothstein Warden Centennial Learning Center, a three-level, 73,000-square-foot building, opened in late 2013. Designed with input from students, faculty, and staff, it was intended to promote interprofessional learning and collaboration between students and faculty. Features of the new building include lecture and learning labs, computer labs, recreation areas, a media room, a fitness center, a group aerobics room, and a new cafeteria. The building was named jointly after longtime Board of Trustees chair and public health activist Ruth Rothstein and Gail Warden, another longtime board member who also served as chair.

Two other new areas have been added to the Health Sciences Building. The Margot A. Surridge Student Welcome Center opened in the fall of 2014. The DeWitt C. Baldwin Institute for Interprofessional Education opened in 2014 and was dedicated on May 15 of that year. The Baldwin Institute is dedicated to advancing interprofessional education and practice in medical and health professions. It is named in honor of DeWitt Baldwin, who is often recognized as the father of interprofessional education.

A statue of Rosalind Franklin was also unveiled in front of the school in May 2014; Franklin's niece and nephew attended the ceremony.

The university's Center for Advanced Simulation in Healthcare at Northwestern Medicine Huntley Hospital, which opened in 2017 in Huntley, is a 30,000 square foot “virtual health system” that uses modern technology and simulation-based training models to help students master clinical skills and behaviors in a realistic, work-based environment. The center is operated by RFU's Department of Healthcare Simulation, which is accredited by the Society for Simulation in Healthcare.

In January 2020, the university opened its $50 million Innovation and Research Park, a four-story, 100,000-square-foot addition on the north side of campus. Two-thirds of the building's space is allocated to RFU research labs and six disease-based centers, while the remaining third houses private healthcare industries and startups.

In 2022, the university launched a College of Nursing, the first of its kind in Lake County, Illinois, with initial programs offering a Master of Science in Nursing for Entry to Practice and Doctor of Nursing Practice-Psychiatric Mental Health Nurse Practitioner. RFU's existing Doctor of Nursing Practice-Nurse Anesthesia program was also transferred to the new college.

== Schools ==
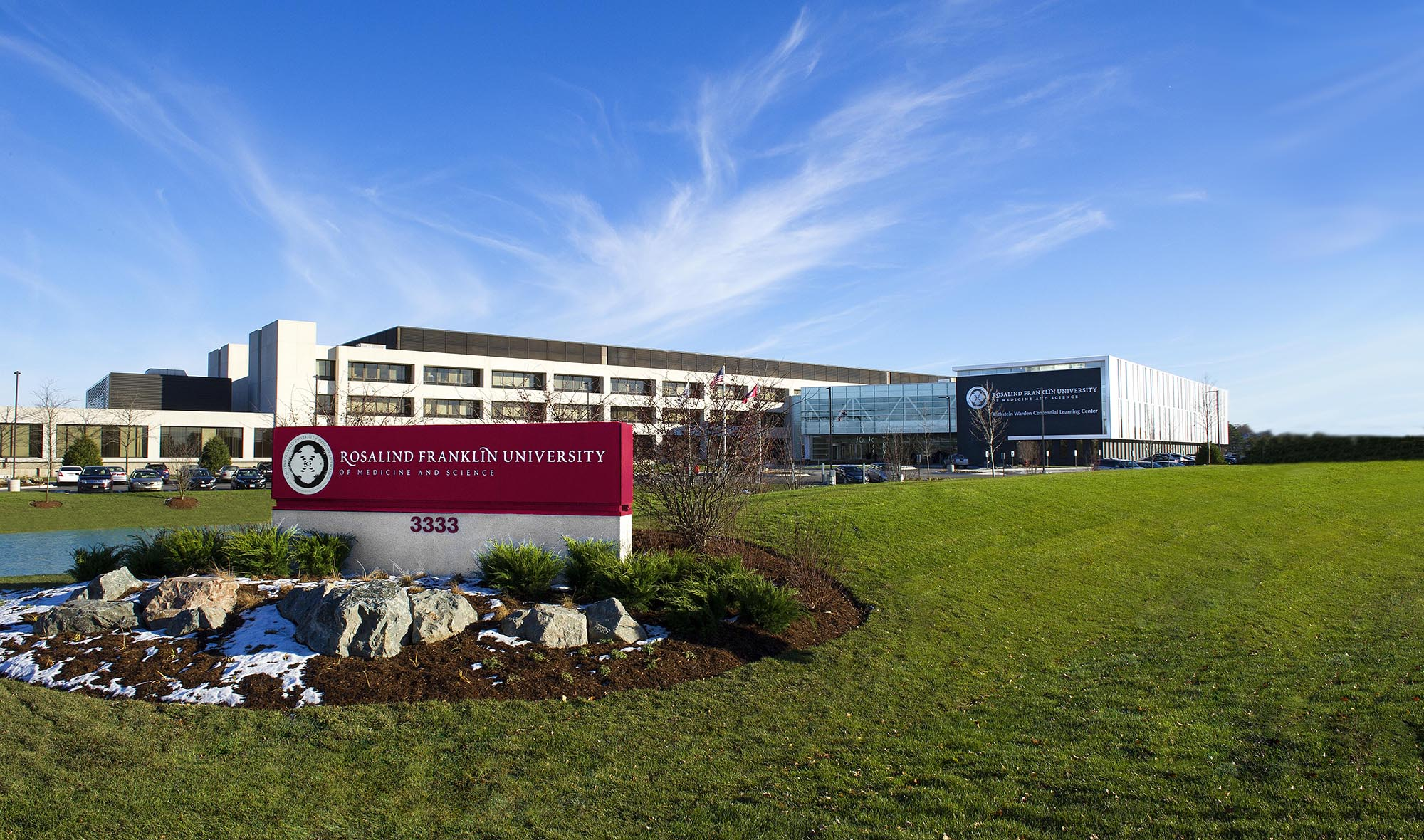
Rosalind Franklin University of Medicine and Science, front lawn near Green Bay Road, North Chicago, Illinois

=== Chicago Medical School ===
Chicago Medical School (CMS), founded in 1912, confers clinical degrees. The entering class each year contains approximately 190 students. During the first two years, students enrolled at CMS study a core of basic sciences that include biochemistry and molecular biology, cell biology and anatomy, microbiology and immunology, and many more. Upon completion of coursework, students are awarded a Doctorate of Medicine (MD).

Chicago Medical School had accreditation issues in 2004 and again in 2013, when it was placed on probation by the Liaison Committee on Medical Education. In February 2014, the LCME determined that the school's areas of concern are no longer in non-compliance. The LCME is the major accrediting body for educational programs at medical schools in the United States and Canada.

=== College of Health Professions ===
The College of Health professions (CHP) was founded as the School of Related Health Sciences in 1970 and took on its present name in 2004. It is a professional school that offers masters and doctoral programs in interprofessional healthcare studies, nutrition, pathologists' assistant, doctor of physical therapy, physician assistant, psychology, biomedical sciences, health administration, and health promotion and wellness.

=== Dr. William M. Scholl College of Podiatric Medicine ===
The Dr. William M. Scholl College of Podiatric Medicine (SCPM) was founded in 1912 by William Scholl and others. The school merged with RFU in 2001. SCPM's program is closely integrated with CMS and other colleges at RFU. Students participate in multiple rounds, including ER, infectious diseases, surgery, and internal medicine.

SCPM is an international leader in podiatric research. The Center for Lower Extremity Ambulatory Research (CLEAR) at RFU conducts research with a special emphasis on diabetic foot and limb preservation. In 2005, SCPM and Advocate Medical Group established the National Center for Limb Preservation at Advocate Lutheran General Hospital in Park Ridge, Illinois.

The campus has a podiatric museum, named Feet First: The Scholl Story, dedicated to Scholl's life and work.

=== School of Graduate and Postdoctoral Studies ===
The School of Graduate and Postdoctoral Studies (SGPS) offers several programs, including interdisciplinary graduate programs in biomedical sciences as well as combined degree programs leading to MD/PhD and DPM/PhD degrees.

=== College of Pharmacy ===
The College of Pharmacy (COP), founded in 2011, offers a four-year program that prepares students to practice in a variety of settings.

The pharmacy curriculum includes four types of teaching environments: lectures, workshops (where students work in small groups to solve problems and discuss patient cases), labs (where students practice formulating unique drug dosage forms or practice patient care in simulated environments), and experiential courses (clinical rotations). Rotations begin in the first year and are required throughout the program. The COP partners with medical centers, clinics, and community pharmacies in the Chicago and Wisconsin metropolitan areas to provide rotations.

Upon completion of coursework, students are awarded a Doctorate of Pharmacy (PharmD).

The COP is the only college of pharmacy in Lake County.

=== College of Nursing ===
The College of Nursing welcomed its first cohort of students in 2022 with a goal of creating a pipeline to meet a growing need for a highly educated nursing workforce in Lake County, Illinois. The school has affiliation agreements with Northwestern Medicine, Ann and Robert H. Lurie Children's Hospital of Chicago, NorthShore University Health System, the Lake County Health Department and the Captain James A. Lovell Federal Health Care Center. It also has academic partnerships with Lake Forest College — including an accelerated Health Professions Program for LFC graduates to complete graduate degrees at RFU — and the College of Lake County.
