= List of Station 19 episodes =

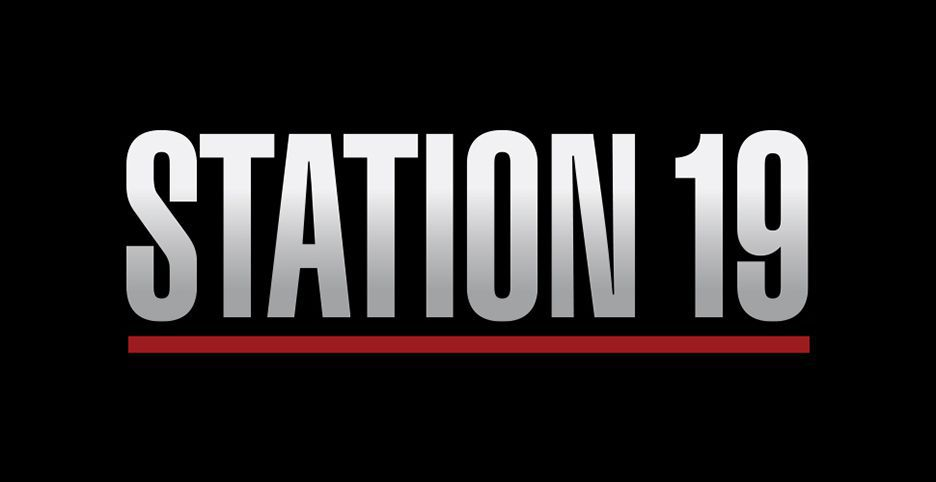
Station 19 title card

Station 19 is an American action and procedural drama created by Stacy McKee. It is a spin-off of Grey's Anatomy, a long-running medical drama created by Shonda Rhimes. The program premiered as a mid-season replacement on March 22, 2018, with a 10-episode first season, aired by the American Broadcasting Company (ABC). Six additional seasons followed between 2018 and 2024. Similar to Grey's Anatomy, every episode of Station 19 is named after a song. The third and seventh seasons were also held as mid-season replacements. The show had an abbreviated fourth season as a result of the COVID-19 pandemic and a shortened final season due to the 2023 Writers Guild of America and SAG-AFTRA strikes. Ahead of the seventh season, ABC cancelled the series and the final episode aired on May 30, 2024, after 105 episodes had been broadcast.

Its premise was first introduced through two different storylines on the parent series. The first spanned the fourteenth season of Grey's Anatomy and revolved around Dr. Ben Warren, portrayed by long-time cast member Jason George, deciding to leave his medical residency to become a firefighter. George was cast in the spin-off as a series regular late in its development process. A second story aired on March 1, 2018, taking the form of a backdoor pilot, and introduced Station 19's leading actor Jaina Lee Ortiz as Andy Herrera. Stefania Spampinato also stars as Dr. Carina DeLuca, who was also first introduced in Grey's Anatomy. The remainder of the initial ensemble cast consisted of Grey Damon, Barrett Doss, Alberto Frezza, Jay Hayden, Okieriete Onaodowan, Danielle Savre, and Miguel Sandoval. Additional cast members who joined later in the series include Carlos Miranda, Josh Randall, Merle Dandridge, and Pat Healy. Following the series' cancellation, George returned to the parent series.

Station 19 is the second spin-off of Grey's Anatomy (2005–present) following Private Practice (2007–2013) and the ninth series produced by Shondaland, Rhimes' production company. The series focuses on the professional and personal lives of firefighters and paramedics working at the Seattle Fire Department's fictional Station 19. Supplemental storylines centered around the Seattle Police Department and the fictional Grey Sloan Memorial Hospital. Several fictional crossover events with Grey's Anatomy aired over the span of the series. The first two seasons were overseen by McKee and Rhimes as showrunners; the two had also been co-showrunners on Grey's Anatomy. They left ahead of the third season and Krista Vernoff took over the next four seasons; at the time, Vernoff was also overseeing production of Grey's Anatomy. Following Vernoff's departure, Peter Paige and Zoanne Clack served as co-showrunners for the final season.

== Series overview ==
Season	Episodes	Originally released		Average U.S. viewers (millions)
Season	Episodes	First released	Last released	Average U.S. viewers (millions)
Backdoor pilot		March 1, 2018		7.52
1	10	March 22, 2018	May 17, 2018	5.27
2	17	October 4, 2018	May 16, 2019	5.29
3	16	January 23, 2020	May 14, 2020	6.46
4	16	November 12, 2020	June 3, 2021	5.18
5	18	September 30, 2021	May 19, 2022	4.47
6	18	October 6, 2022	May 18, 2023	3.86
7	10	March 14, 2024	May 30, 2024	2.45

== Episodes ==
=== Backdoor pilot (2018) ===
For the backdoor pilot, "No. overall" and "No. in season" refer to the episode's place in the order of episodes of the parent series Grey's Anatomy.

Episode listing for Grey's Anatomy season 14 episode 13
No. overall	No. in season	Title	Directed by	Written by	Original release date	Prod. code	U.S. viewers (millions)
306	13	"You Really Got a Hold on Me"	Nzingha Stewart	Stacy McKee	March 1, 2018	1413	7.52
A house fire brings two young boys, who were rescued by the Seattle Fire Department's Station 19, to the ER. Meredith Grey meets Andy Herrera, a firefighter, who has her hand inside the patient, clamping his abdominal aorta. While Andy gets a front row seat to view the action inside the OR, Ben Warren struggles with the idea of not being a surgeon anymore. Dr. Tom Koracick, Amelia Shepherd's former professor, shows up to help her with her research project, but quickly shoots down her ideas. However, when they confront each other about their difference in opinion, they come up with an idea to save her patient. Richard Webber watches Miranda Bailey very closely, as it is her first day back after recovering from her heart attack. Jackson Avery begins to worry about April Kepner and the fact that the interns have nicknamed her "the Party".

=== Season 1 (2018) ===
List of Station 19 season 1 episodes
No. overall	No. in season	Title	Directed by	Written by	Original release date	Prod. code	U.S. viewers (millions)
1	1	"Stuck"	Paris Barclay	Stacy McKee	March 22, 2018	101	5.43
2	2	"Invisible to Me"	Paris Barclay	Stacy McKee	March 22, 2018	102	5.43
3	3	"Contain the Flame"	Mary Lou Belli	Wendy Calhoun	March 29, 2018	103	5.86
4	4	"Reignited"	Dennis Smith	Ilene Rosenzweig	April 5, 2018	104	5.09
5	5	"Shock to the System"	Milan Cheylov	Anupam Nigam	April 12, 2018	105	5.59
6	6	"Stronger Together"	Nzingha Stewart	Angela L. Harvey	April 19, 2018	106	5.41
7	7	"Let It Burn"	James Hanlon	Barbara Kaye Friend	April 26, 2018	107	5.17
8	8	"Every Second Counts"	Marisol Adler	Tia Napolitano	May 3, 2018	108	5.14
9	9	"Hot Box"	Nicole Rubio	Phillip Iscove	May 10, 2018	109	4.45
10	10	"Not Your Hero"	Paris Barclay	Stacy McKee	May 17, 2018	110	5.10

=== Season 2 (2018–19) ===
List of Station 19 season 2 episodes
No. overall	No. in season	Title	Directed by	Written by	Original release date	Prod. code	U.S. viewers (millions)
11	1	"No Recovery"	Paris Barclay	Stacy McKee	October 4, 2018	201	5.17
12	2	"Under the Surface"	Milan Cheylov	Tia Napolitano	October 11, 2018	202	6.54
13	3	"Home to Hold Onto"	Tessa Blake	Anupam Nigam	October 18, 2018	203	4.16
14	4	"Lost and Found"	Marcus Stokes	Jim Campolongo	October 25, 2018	204	5.02
15	5	"Do a Little Harm..."	Sylvain White	Angela L. Harvey	November 1, 2018	205	4.89
16	6	"Last Day on Earth"	Steve Robin	Phillip Iscove	November 8, 2018	206	5.10
17	7	"Weather the Storm"	Oliver Bokelberg	Stacy McKee	November 15, 2018	207	5.91
18	8	"Crash and Burn"	Paris Barclay	Tia Napolitano	March 7, 2019	208	5.24
19	9	"I Fought the Law"	Sydney Freeland	Barbara Kaye Friend	March 14, 2019	209	5.02
20	10	"Crazy Train"	Daryn Okada	Anupam Nigam	March 21, 2019	210	5.55
21	11	"Baby Boom"	Marcus Stokes	Molly Green & James Leffler	March 28, 2019	211	5.44
22	12	"When It Rains, It Pours!"	Ellen Pressman	Trey Callaway	April 4, 2019	212	5.26
23	13	"The Dark Night"	Stacey K. Black	Phillip Iscove	April 11, 2019	213	5.38
24	14	"Friendly Fire"	DeMane Davis	Jim Campolongo	April 18, 2019	214	4.96
25	15	"Always Ready"	Nicole Rubio	Tia Napolitano	May 2, 2019	215	6.39
26	16	"For Whom the Bell Tolls"	Tessa Blake	Barbara Kaye Friend	May 9, 2019	216	5.05
27	17	"Into the Wildfire"	Paris Barclay	Stacy McKee	May 16, 2019	217	4.82

=== Season 3 (2020) ===
List of Station 19 season 3 episodes
No. overall	No. in season	Title	Directed by	Written by	Original release date	Prod. code	U.S. viewers (millions)
28	1	"I Know This Bar"	Paris Barclay	Krista Vernoff	January 23, 2020	301	7.02
29	2	"Indoor Fireworks"	Paris Barclay	Kiley Donovan	January 30, 2020	302	6.12
30	3	"Eulogy"	Eric Laneuville	Anupam Nigam	February 6, 2020	303	5.92
31	4	"House Where Nobody Lives"	Oliver Bokelberg	Meghann Plunkett	February 13, 2020	304	6.00
32	5	"Into the Woods"	Andy Wolk	Tyrone Finch	February 20, 2020	305	6.27
33	6	"Ice Ice Baby"	Tessa Blake	Rob Giles	February 27, 2020	306	6.59
34	7	"Satellite of Love"	Paris Barclay	Chris Downey	March 5, 2020	307	6.00
35	8	"Born to Run"	David Greenspan	Jill Weinberger	March 12, 2020	308	6.64
36	9	"Poor Wandering One"	Janice Cooke	Brian Anthony	March 19, 2020	309	7.39
37	10	"Something About What Happens When We Talk"	Yangzom Brauen	Krista Vernoff	March 26, 2020	310	6.90
38	11	"No Days Off"	Tom Verica	Cinque Henderson	April 2, 2020	311	7.16
39	12	"I'll Be Seeing You"	Daryn Okada	Anupam Nigam & Meghann Plunkett	April 9, 2020	312	7.56
40	13	"Dream a Little Dream of Me"	Stacey K. Black	Rob Giles	April 16, 2020	313	6.72
41	14	"The Ghosts That Haunt Me"	Pete Chatmon	Tyrone Finch	April 30, 2020	314	5.58
42	15	"Bad Guy"	DeMane Davis	Kiley Donovan	May 7, 2020	315	5.57
43	16	"Louder Than a Bomb"	Paris Barclay	Emmylou Diaz	May 14, 2020	316	5.91

=== Season 4 (2020–21) ===
List of Station 19 season 4 episodes
No. overall	No. in season	Title	Directed by	Written by	Original release date	Prod. code	U.S. viewers (millions)
44	1	"Nothing Seems the Same"	Paris Barclay	Kiley Donovan	November 12, 2020	401	6.59
45	2	"Wild World"	Bethany Rooney	Emmylou Diaz	November 19, 2020	402	5.66
46	3	"We Are Family"	Paris Barclay	Zaiver Sinnett	December 3, 2020	403	5.58
47	4	"Don't Look Back in Anger"	Bethany Rooney	Brian Anthony	December 10, 2020	404	5.58
48	5	"Out of Control"	Michael Medico	Tyrone Finch	December 17, 2020	405	5.63
49	6	"Train in Vain"	Allison Liddi-Brown	Teleplay by : Meghann Plunkett; Story by : Rob Giles & Meghann Plunkett	March 11, 2021	406	5.40
50	7	"Learning to Fly"	Michael Medico	Sam Forman	March 18, 2021	407	5.10
51	8	"Make No Mistake, He's Mine"	Allison Liddi-Brown	Shalisha Francis-Feusner	March 25, 2021	408	5.26
52	9	"No One Is Alone"	Stacey K. Black	Rochelle Zimmerman	April 1, 2021	409	4.78
53	10	"Save Yourself"	David Greenspan	Emily Culver	April 8, 2021	410	4.87
54	11	"Here It Comes Again"	Karen Gaviola	Emmylou Diaz & Tyrone Finch	April 15, 2021	412	5.10
55	12	"Get Up, Stand Up"	Daryn Okada	Krista Vernoff	April 22, 2021	414	4.47
56	13	"I Guess I'm Floating"	Paris Barclay	Daniel K. Hoh	May 6, 2021	411	4.52
57	14	"Comfortably Numb"	Peter Paige	Kiley Donovan	May 20, 2021	413	4.92
58	15	"Say Her Name"	Oliver Bokelberg	Zaiver Sinnett & Rochelle Zimmerman	May 27, 2021	415	4.59
59	16	"Forever and Ever, Amen"	Paris Barclay	Kiley Donovan	June 3, 2021	416	4.90

=== Season 5 (2021–22) ===
List of Station 19 season 5 episodes
No. overall	No. in season	Title	Directed by	Written by	Original release date	Prod. code	U.S. viewers (millions)
60	1	"Phoenix from the Flame"	Stacey K. Black	Krista Vernoff	September 30, 2021	501	5.04
61	2	"Can't Feel My Face"	Peter Paige	Kiley Donovan	October 7, 2021	502	4.29
62	3	"Too Darn Hot"	Michael Medico	Rochelle Zimmerman	October 14, 2021	503	4.29
63	4	"100% or Nothing"	Sheelin Choksey	Emily Culver	October 21, 2021	504	4.65
64	5	"Things We Lost in the Fire"	Daryn Okada	Henry Robles	November 11, 2021	505	4.58
65	6	"Little Girl Blue"	Diana C. Valentine	Tyrone Finch & Meghann Plunkett	November 18, 2021	506	4.85
66	7	"A House Is Not a Home"	David Greenspan	Leah Gonzalez	December 9, 2021	507	4.07
67	8	"All I Want for Christmas Is You"	Peter Paige	Zaiver Sinnett	December 16, 2021	508	4.69
68	9	"Started from the Bottom"	Paula Hunziker	Emily Culver	February 24, 2022	509	4.98
69	10	"Searching for the Ghost"	Oliver Bokelberg	Staci Okunola	March 3, 2022	510	4.46
70	11	"The Little Things You Do Together"	Tessa Blake	Kiley Donovan & Rochelle Zimmerman	March 10, 2022	511	4.25
71	12	"In My Tree" "Who's Gonna Miss Me?"	Tamika Miller	Daniel K. Hoh	March 17, 2022	512	4.24
72	13	"Cold Blue Steel and Sweet Fire"	Paris Barclay	Alex Fernandez	March 24, 2022	513	4.60
73	14	"Alone in the Dark"	Stacey K. Black	Zaiver Sinnett	March 31, 2022	514	4.44
74	15	"When the Party's Over"	Daryn Okada	Meghann Plunkett	April 7, 2022	515	4.52
75	16	"Death and the Maiden"	Jason George	Rochelle Zimmerman & Leah Gonzalez	May 5, 2022	516	4.28
76	17	"The Road You Didn't Take"	Paula Hunziker	Henry Robles & Staci Okunola	May 12, 2022	517	3.95
77	18	"Crawl Out Through the Fallout"	Stacey K. Black	Kiley Donovan	May 19, 2022	518	4.28

=== Season 6 (2022–23) ===
List of Station 19 season 6 episodes
No. overall	No. in season	Title	Directed by	Written by	Original release date	Prod. code	U.S. viewers (millions)
78	1	"Twist and Shout"	Stacey K. Black	Krista Vernoff & Kiley Donovan	October 6, 2022	601	4.19
79	2	"Everybody's Got Something to Hide Except Me and My Monkey"	Peter Paige	Henry Robles	October 13, 2022	602	3.70
80	3	"Dancing with Our Hands Tied"	Tamika Miller	Daniel Arkin	October 20, 2022	603	3.90
81	4	"Demons"	Michael Medico	Emily Culver	October 27, 2022	604	3.87
82	5	"Pick Up the Pieces"	Jason George	Mellow Brown	November 3, 2022	605	3.52
83	6	"Everybody Says Don't"	Daryn Okada	Rochelle Zimmerman	November 10, 2022	606	3.99
84	7	"We Build Then We Break"	Peter Paige	Zaiver Sinnett	February 23, 2023	607	3.97
85	8	"I Know a Place"	Paula Hunziker	Leah Gonzalez	March 2, 2023	608	3.83
86	9	"Come as You Are"	Tamika Miller	Staci Okunola	March 9, 2023	609	3.97
87	10	"Even Better Than the Real Thing"	Paris Barclay	Alex Fernandez	March 16, 2023	610	4.30
88	11	"Could I Leave You?"	Michael Medico	Rochelle Zimmerman & Beresford Bennett	March 23, 2023	611	3.88
89	12	"Never Gonna Give You Up"	Kelly Park	Meghann Plunkett	March 30, 2023	612	3.76
90	13	"It's All Gonna Break"	David Greenspan	Benjamin Hayes	April 6, 2023	613	3.70
91	14	"Get It All Out"	Stacey K. Black	Peter Paige	April 13, 2023	614	3.91
92	15	"What Are You Willing to Lose"	Paris Barclay	Zaiver Sinnett & Henry Robles	April 20, 2023	615	3.96
93	16	"Dirty Laundry"	Danielle Savre	Emily Culver	May 4, 2023	616	3.79
94	17	"All These Things That I've Done"	Yangzom Brauen	Staci Okunola & Leah Gonzalez	May 11, 2023	617	3.51
95	18	"Glamorous Life"	Stacey K. Black	Zoanne Clack	May 18, 2023	618	3.72

=== Season 7 (2024) ===
List of Station 19 season 7 episodes
No. overall	No. in season	Title	Directed by	Written by	Original release date	Prod. code	U.S. viewers (millions)
96	1	"This Woman's Work"	Paris Barclay	Henry Robles	March 14, 2024	701	2.79
97	2	"Good Grief"	Tessa Blake	Meghann Plunkett	March 21, 2024	702	2.62
98	3	"True Colors"	Peter Paige	Staci Okunola	March 28, 2024	703	2.48
99	4	"Trouble Man"	Stefania Spampinato	Mellow Brown & Sybil Azur	April 4, 2024	704	2.57
100	5	"My Way"	Daryn Okada	Emily Culver & Alex Fernandez	April 11, 2024	705	2.40
101	6	"With So Little to Be Sure Of"	Boris Kodjoe	Rochelle Zimmerman	May 2, 2024	706	2.16
102	7	"Give It All"	David Greenspan	Leah Gonzalez & Heidi-Marie Ferren	May 9, 2024	707	2.31
103	8	"Ushers of the New World"	Letia Solomon	Shernold Edwards & Beresford Bennett	May 16, 2024	708	1.93
104	9	"How Am I Supposed to Live Without You"	Tessa Blake	Zaiver Sinnett	May 23, 2024	709	2.40
105	10	"One Last Time"	Peter Paige	Teleplay by : Zoanne Clack; Story by : José Díaz & Miriam Arghandiwal	May 30, 2024	710	2.90

== Viewing figures ==
=== Seasons 1–4 ===
Station 19 : U.S. viewers per episode (millions)

Season	Episode number																	Average
Season	1	2	3	4	5	6	7	8	9	10	11	12	13	14	15	16	17	Average
1	5.43	5.43	5.86	5.09	5.59	5.41	5.17	5.14	4.45	5.10	–							5.27
2	5.17	6.54	4.16	5.02	4.89	5.10	5.91	5.24	5.17	5.55	5.44	5.26	5.38	4.84	6.39	5.05	4.82	5.29
3	7.02	6.12	5.92	6.00	6.27	6.59	6.00	6.64	7.39	6.90	7.16	7.56	6.72	5.58	5.57	5.91	–	6.46
4	6.59	5.66	5.58	5.58	5.63	5.40	5.10	5.26	4.78	4.87	5.10	4.47	4.52	4.92	4.59	4.90	–	5.18

Audience measurement performed by Nielsen Media Research

=== Seasons 5–7 ===
Station 19 : U.S. viewers per episode (millions)

Season	Episode number																		Average
Season	1	2	3	4	5	6	7	8	9	10	11	12	13	14	15	16	17	18	Average
5	5.04	4.29	4.29	4.65	4.58	4.85	4.07	4.69	4.98	4.46	4.25	4.23	4.60	4.44	4.52	4.28	3.95	4.28	4.47
6	4.20	3.70	3.90	3.87	3.52	3.98	3.97	3.83	3.97	4.30	3.88	3.76	3.70	3.91	3.96	3.79	3.51	3.72	3.86
7	2.79	2.62	2.48	2.57	2.40	2.16	2.31	1.93	2.40	2.90	–								2.45

Audience measurement performed by Nielsen Media Research
