= Grey's Anatomy season 18 =

Season of television series

Grey's Anatomy
- Season 18
- Promotional poster for the eighteenth season of Grey's Anatomy
- Showrunner: Krista Vernoff
- Starring: Ellen Pompeo; Chandra Wilson; James Pickens Jr.; Kevin McKidd; Caterina Scorsone; Camilla Luddington; Kelly McCreary; Kim Raver; Jake Borelli; Chris Carmack; Richard Flood; Anthony Hill; Scott Speedman
- No. of episodes: 20

Release
- Original network: ABC
- Original release: September 30, 2021 – May 26, 2022

Season chronology
- ← Previous; Season 17 Next → Season 19

The eighteenth season of the American television medical drama Grey's Anatomy was ordered on May 10, 2021, by the American Broadcasting Company (ABC). It premiered on September 30, 2021, for the 2021–22 broadcast season. The season is produced by ABC Signature, in association with Shondaland Production Company and Entertainment One Television; the showrunner being Krista Vernoff.

This is the first season not to feature Jesse Williams, Giacomo Gianniotti, and Greg Germann as series regulars since the seventh, twelfth, and sixteenth seasons, respectively. The season marked the return of Kate Walsh as Addison Montgomery for three episodes, after her last appearance on the season 8 episode "If/Then". On January 10, 2022, ABC renewed the series for a nineteenth season.

The website Screen Rant ranked the season #18 on their 2023 ranking of the 19 Grey's Anatomy seasons.

== Episodes ==
The number in the "No. overall" column refers to the episode's number within the overall series, whereas the number in the "No. in season" column refers to the episode's number within this particular season. "U.S. viewers in millions" refers to the number of Americans in millions who watched the episodes live.

| No. overall | No. in season | Title | Directed by | Written by | Original release date | U.S. viewers (millions) |
|---|---|---|---|---|---|---|
| 381 | 1 | "Here Comes the Sun" | Debbie Allen | Meg Marinis | September 30, 2021 | 4.77 |
As she ponders what to do with her life after surviving COVID-19, Meredith travels to the Mayo Clinic in Minnesota to attend the opening of a library dedicated to her mother. While there, she reconnects with Dr. Nick Marsh, whom she treated years ago. Dr. David Hamilton, a former colleague of her mother's, reveals his plan to open up a state-of-the-art research center dedicated to curing Parkinson's disease, with Meredith as the project's public face to attract talent. After his youngest son's panic attacks, Hayes connects with Bailey as they interview candidates to replace Jackson and Tom, as well as Jo, who is adjusting to life as a single mother and OB/GYN resident with Levi's help. Following her rejection of his proposal, Amelia and Link struggle to maintain their relationship, while Maggie and Winston enjoy their honeymoon phase. Owen and Teddy tie the knot in Joe's bar with a newly single Megan officiating after their planned ceremony in the park is ruined by a tandem bike crashing into the priest. Note : This episode concludes a crossover event that begins on Station 19 season 5 episode 1.
| 382 | 2 | "Some Kind of Tomorrow" | Kevin McKidd | Felicia Pride | October 7, 2021 | 4.04 |
Undecided about Dr. Hamilton's Parkinson's research project proposal, Meredith flies Amelia out to Minnesota to help her make a decision. Amelia immediately jumps on board, though Meredith later reveals to Nick on their first date that she's afraid the project will fail. Meredith eventually agrees to join the project as long as she can continue to work in Seattle. At Grey Sloan, Richard motivates the interns through a series of competitions, with Levi winning the opportunity to scrub in on Jo's surgery. Winston treats a woman with kidney failure, whom Winston believes is not on the transplant list due to her race. Megan and Hayes work on a young boy involved in a car crash, while Teddy and Owen treat the boy's father, who has pulmonary fibrosis but does not want to get treated.
| 383 | 3 | "Hotter Than Hell" | Chandra Wilson | Jamie Denbo | October 14, 2021 | 4.05 |
The residents are treated with a special guest mentor for the day, Dr. Addison Montgomery, who is going to perform a ground-breaking uterus transplant, with Levi assisting her. Meredith reluctantly tells Richard about her plan to work in both Seattle and Minnesota, and he agrees to take her position as Residency Director. Bailey and Hayes treat a young woman involved in a jet-ski accident who refuses to call her parents, while Winston continues to try to get a kidney for his patient. Due to the intense heatwave, the air-conditioning in the hospital breaks, and, against the clock, Addison requests help from Meredith. After the surgery is a success, Addison gets emotional being back in Seattle for the first time since Derek died. She and Meredith both mourn him together. While Link and Teddy try to fix the AC, Link expresses his anger at Amelia, who is wrapped up in the Parkinson's project, and Teddy cheers him and the rest of the staff up with a party in the morgue. Addison and Amelia reunite once the air-conditioning is restored, and Meredith introduces Addison to Meredith and Derek's children.
| 384 | 4 | "With a Little Help From My Friends" | Michael Watkins | Jess Righthand | October 21, 2021 | 3.91 |
Richard recruits a reluctant Meredith and Bailey to help him launch a new teaching method, where residents are to perform a lap chole from start to finish all on their own. Addison butts heads with Amelia on her uterus transplant patient, though they eventually come to a consensus on treatment. Jo works on a patient who must undergo a premature delivery, Owen and Winston treat a veteran with a difficult prognosis ahead, and Hayes gets to know Megan better.
| 385 | 5 | "Bottle Up and Explode!" | Lindsay Cohen | Kiley Donovan & Beto Skubs | November 11, 2021 | 4.75 |
A gas pipeline explosion sends injured bystanders to Grey Sloan, including Station 19 firefighter Vic Hughes, who doesn't realize that another firefighter, Dean Miller, has been killed by the explosion. Owen, who is working with Teddy on their burn-pit study, is thrown into a PTSD-induced panic attack due to the explosion, and starts ordering the veterans around even though Teddy tells him to stop. Winston and Hayes perform heart surgery on Megan's son, Farouk, and Ben nervously tells Bailey that, since Dean has now died, Ben and Bailey are legally responsible to raise Pru, Dean's daughter, due to a promise Ben made to Dean. In Minnesota, Meredith brings Tom Koracick on board, who is revealed to have a difficult past with Dr. Hamilton. Amelia gets closer with another member of the project, Dr. Kai Bartley, and Meredith and Nick further their relationship. Note : This episode concludes a crossover event that begins on Station 19 season 5 episode 5.
| 386 | 6 | "Everyday Is a Holiday (With You)" | Tony Phelan | Meg Marinis | November 18, 2021 | 4.18 |
A snowstorm in Minnesota keeps Meredith away from her kids for Thanksgiving, but Nick cancels his own plans and joins Meredith in her hotel room, where they take their relationship to the next level. In Seattle, Farouk continues to recovery from his heart surgery, only for him to undergo complications that send Teddy and Hayes back into the operating room with him. One of Owen's veteran patients, Noah, is admitted to the hospital again, and once Owen realizes not much can be done anymore, he sends Noah home to die as comfortably as he can. Jo is forced to perform an emergency C-section and hysterectomy on an overworked pregnant woman, and Link and Amelia reconcile after cooking Thanksgiving dinner for Meredith's kids.
| 387 | 7 | "Today Was a Fairytale" | Debbie Allen | Julie Wong | December 9, 2021 | 3.65 |
Upset that Amelia still doesn't want to get married despite hooking up with him on Thanksgiving, Link is in a perpetual bad mood, prompting Jo to spend the day with him and the kids at the park. At the park, an outdoor children's theater show abruptly ends after one of the actors collapses due to a heart condition, effectively breaking his leg, which forces Jo and Link to medically intervene. Bailey is frustrated with the less-than-competent medical students, and Maggie spends the majority of the day in the on-call room with Winston. In Minnesota, Meredith unknowingly performs surgery on Nick's best friend, and Dr. Hamilton gets increasingly frustrated about the lack of progress of the Parkinson's project.
| 388 | 8 | "It Came Upon a Midnight Clear" | Michael Watkins | Jase Miles-Perez | December 16, 2021 | 4.20 |
As Christmas draws near, Owen feels tormented by the recent passing of Noah, while Cormac assesses that Megan is severely depressed. Cormac, Teddy, and Owen retrieve a donor heart for Farouk. En route back to Grey Sloan, their driver suffers a stroke and the car ends up on the edge of a ravine. Teddy manages to climb out with the organ and heads to the road for help. Owen reveals to Cormac that he gave Noah medication to die and made a promise to do the same for other terminal veterans. Seconds after Cormac gets out, the car with Owen still inside slides down the slope. Meanwhile, Meredith and Amelia fly Dr. Hamilton and Kai to Seattle for Dr. Hamilton's big surgery, which is delayed when he has a bowel perforation. Maggie is worried upon hearing about the Webber method, which proves grounded when Levi oversteps during surgery and the patient bleeds out on the table. New resident Jordan requests to work with Bailey on his first day at Grey Sloan. Link practices a declaration of love for Amelia on Jo, who has trouble keeping her feelings for him at bay, only to find Amelia kissing Kai.
| 389 | 9 | "No Time to Die" | Linda Klein | Krista Vernoff | February 24, 2022 | 4.65 |
Unfortunately, Owen is rescued from the car by the Station 19 firefighters and taken to Grey Sloan, but his leg is shattered and requires surgery. Hayes gives the donor heart for Farouk to Winston, who notices a bruise on the heart. Winston calls Maggie for backup in the OR, and they successfully transplant the heart. Hayes struggles with Owen's revelation about Noah and warns Owen to tell the truth or Hayes will report him. Following losing his patient, Schmitt has a breakdown and obsessively scrubs his hands, later being stopped by his fellow residents. Bailey cancels the Webber Method teaching program. Amelia and Link argue after he sees her kissing Kai. Link finds comfort with Jo, and they have sex. Nick arrives in Seattle from Minnesota and consoles Meredith after barely saving Hamilton on the table. Hayes resigns and tells Bailey that he will be returning to Ireland with his children. Note : This episode concludes a crossover event that begins on Station 19 season 5 episode 9.
| 390 | 10 | "Living in a House Divided" | Allison Liddi-Brown | Jamie Denbo | March 3, 2022 | 3.95 |
At the M&M, Levi is unsettled describing the events surrounding the death of his patient and leaves the hospital. Maggie questions Richard on the suitability of the Webber method, causing him to lash out at her and Meredith for not being around. A previous patient of Amelia is admitted, Jo is called to consult, and Amelia feels tension between them. Link has an obese patient, who he assumes will be better if she loses weight. Perez notices she has a different cause not related to her weight and needs surgery. Bailey tells Richard the Webber method should be suspended permanently. Teddy knows Owen is hiding something but he will not tell her.
| 391 | 11 | "Legacy" | Kevin McKidd | Mark Driscoll | March 10, 2022 | 3.87 |
The day of the David’s Parkinson's trial surgery has come. Meredith opens up the surgery to viewing by the residents to inspire them. Link takes Owen to do his physical rehab. After the session, he has a cerebrospinal fluid leak. Amelia cannot leave the Parkinson's surgery, so Koracick agrees to help Owen. Nick has to perform a liver transplant. He meets the donor’s family to find out more about him, before giving the liver to his patient. Richard tries to talk Levi into coming back to the hospital. Jo is avoiding Link by doing night shifts. She ends up in the bar drinking with Teddy who is avoiding Owen since she discovered what he is doing for the vets. Later Jo walks in on Link having a shower, they kiss, she pushes him away and asks him to leave.
| 392 | 12 | "The Makings of You" | Debbie Allen | Felicia Pride | March 17, 2022 | 3.60 |
Taking some time away from the hospital, Meredith and Nick head up to Nick's cabin for the weekend, where they run into Nick's niece, Charlotte, and her new boyfriend, Silver. Things quickly go sour when Charlotte reveals that she will be dropping out of college to travel to Costa Rica with Silver, forcing Meredith to contend with Nick's poor reaction. Elsewhere, Amelia sees a new side of Kai in Minnesota after they head to a bar, where Kai performs with their band on stage. Impressed by their musical abilities, Amelia advances her relationship with Kai. And, back in Seattle, Maggie, who is sick with the flu, finds an old letter addressed to her from Ellis. As the letter unearths deep-seated abandonment issues, Maggie has a fever dream in which she converses with Ellis in order to address why Ellis gave up Maggie in the first place.
| 393 | 13 | "Put the Squeeze on Me" | Allison Liddi-Brown | Julie Wong | March 24, 2022 | 4.24 |
When a man shows up with his pet python dangerously wrapped around him, many of the doctors are forced to face their deep-seated fears of snakes. Among the lot are Bailey, who works tirelessly to save the patient in an attempt to distract herself from her marriage woes following a kiss from a younger resident, Jordan, the other day; Maggie, who wonders what else she doesn't know about Winston after learning that, unlike everyone else, he is a big fan of snakes; and Jo, who has asked Link to move out due to the growing feelings she has for him that she feels she cannot disclose since he is still in love with Amelia. In Minnesota, Meredith is offered a permanent position as head of the Grey Center and Chief of General Surgery at the Mayo Clinic but is unsure whether she should take it despite Nick's enthusiasm.
| 394 | 14 | "Road Trippin'" | Linda Klein | Beto Skubs | March 31, 2022 | 3.93 |
Maggie is tasked with treating Fernanda, a young girl with a congenital heart condition that has developed into aortic stenosis. Fernanda has been documenting her journey to recovery online, and because she and her family live in Boston, they have rented a motorhome to drive across the country so that Maggie can perform the rare and risky Ross-Kona procedure on Fernanda. As Maggie deals with Fernanda's health rapidly deteriorating, Winston is forced to address his own family issues due to his younger brother, Wendell, arriving to Seattle. Eventually, Winston discloses to Maggie that when his and Wendell's mother died from cancer years ago, Wendell did not deal with it well. Meanwhile, Meredith is sick at home, which contributes to the burgeoning physician shortage at Grey Sloan, sending Bailey and Owen into a frenzy. In the midst of the chaos, Bailey learns that the hospital has received several anonymous complaints about the residency program and, as such, will have to undergo a review by the Medical Accreditation Council.
| 395 | 15 | "Put It to the Test" | Kevin McKidd | Zoanne Clack | April 7, 2022 | 4.21 |
The Medical Accreditation Council arrives at Grey Sloan to assess the legitimacy of the hospital's residency program, making Bailey a nervous wreck. The all-day test does not go as planned, with many of the doctors fumbling during their interviews or when Bailey is giving a tour to the council's representatives. Richard is unable to help Bailey, as he has submitted himself to a physician assessment, which is to be conducted by Dr. Hamilton and Kai. At the same time, Nick flies to Seattle to perform a kidney transplant, much to Bailey's gratitude. However, things quickly go south when Bailey learns through the grapevine that Dr. Hamilton has offered Meredith a full-time position in Minnesota – one that she is seriously considering. Bailey's insistence that Meredith is doing what she always does – following an attending across the country – gives Bailey a panic attack, though at the end of the day, Meredith tells Nick she's going to take the offer. Meanwhile, Levi and his mother get into an argument when Levi realizes it was his mother who complained about the residency program, which leads her to storm off and fall down the stairs, which prompts Levi to intervene and help save her life.
| 396 | 16 | "Should I Stay or Should I Go" | Michael Watkins | Jase Miles-Perez & Jess Righthand | May 5, 2022 | 3.90 |
Catherine returns to Grey Sloan following its probationary status, furious that the Catherine Fox Foundation hospitals are all under scrutiny. Addison returns to Grey Sloan with her transplant uterus patient, Tovah, who is now experiencing pain, and mediates Meredith and Richard butting heads over her offer to go to Minnesota. Tovah loses the fetus, causing Addison to lose her patience and yell at Webber, Catherine, and Meredith about their recent behavior. Winston's brother Wendell tries to sell his new tech for heart monitoring to Grey Sloan, with Maggie enthusiastic and Winston hesitant. The monitors don't work, and Wendell begs Winston for help. Jo flirts with a man, making Link jealous. Owen returns to work, and Teddy and Owen struggle with their child's gender identity while treating two factory workers in an accident with ex vivo limb perfusion, and eventually decide to attend therapy as a couple to ensure they are on the same page. Bailey begs Jo to return as a surgical attending, and Jo decides to keep her OB spot and moonlight as an attending. Bailey eventually takes a vacation day after recognizing symptoms of occupational burnout in herself. Nick shows up on Meredith's doorstep and offers to work locum at Grey Sloan so she can stay. Meredith becomes angry, telling him it is her decision, but they resolve to stay long enough to save the program.
| 397 | 17 | "I'll Cover You" | Debbie Allen | Emily Culver & Kiley Donovan | May 12, 2022 | 3.60 |
Nick begins to work locum at Grey Sloan under a begrudging Bailey, who lashes out at Nick, Meredith, and the other attendings about the program's state. Webber accidentally drinks a marijuana drink that Catherine had in their fridge, breaking his sobriety. Meredith cancels her day to watch over him. Jo and Link argue about spending time together and disagree about a patient, Simon, with recurrent cancer. Teddy and Owen struggle in family therapy over Leo's gender identity; Owen is fine with it, while Teddy struggles with not having concrete steps to follow. Nick and Bailey butt heads as he takes over Meredith's service. Bailey witnesses Nick give Schmidt excellent teaching during surgery. Maggie and Winston argue as their patient admits to lying to her wife about her symptoms, causing Winston to lash out because of his recent troubles with his brother, and Maggie eventually kicks him out of surgery. Later, Winston admits to Maggie that his brother lied about the heart monitors. Jo and Link tell their patient Simon's wife, Kristen, that he may not survive this bout of cancer, and she demands to have the baby delivered so that her husband can meet him, causing Jo and Link to argue more. Their fight leads to Jo admitting that she is in love with Link, but he does not reciprocate her feelings. Meredith and Bailey connect and mend their relationship; Bailey apologizes for her recent anger and admits to Meredith that she doesn't know what to do about the program. Catherine eventually admits to Richard that her cancer has returned and progressed.
| 398 | 18 | "Stronger Than Hate" | Chandra Wilson | Julie Wong | May 19, 2022 | 3.80 |
Maggie prepares a dinner party at Meredith's for her colleagues to meet Nick. A victim of a hate-crime for being Asian-American is admitted to the hospital, causing Nico and the new head of plastics, Lin, to discuss being American. Catherine attends oncology unit, supported by Richard. They meet Simon there; he is having more chemo so he can live to see his unborn son. Kai confides to Owen that while they have "niblings" (nieces and nephews), they do not want children, causing them to break up with Amelia, as they want different things in life. Seeing her husband Winston's brother, Wendell, and Meredith's boyfriend, Nick talk, Maggie wonders if Mer was dating a con man, too, because he was the only person she knew who had charmed her as much as her brother-in-law. Nick and Bailey bond over having the same old boss. Wendell reveals that he is in hiding from people he owes money to, but Winston is angry he chose to do so in Seattle. He orders his brother to leave Seattle but Wendell secretly stays behind. Maggie reveals she gave $10,000 of her savings to Wendell pay them back, but Winston reveals he had already given him the money. Link tells Teddy he fears sleeping with Jo has ruined his friendship with her.
| 399 | 19 | "Out for Blood" | Kevin McKidd | Meg Marinis | May 26, 2022 | 4.19 |
Meredith has nightmares haunted by her mother. When she wakes up, she and Zola look at real estate listings in Minnesota. Amelia arrives to show Meredith that their article on the Parkinson's project has been published. Winston refuses to let his brother steal from Maggie without consequences. Maggie contemplates the definition of whether she has siblings or not, having grown up an only child. Jo admits to Link that she is unenthusiastic about Todd after sex together was awkward. A veteran's husband blackmails Owen to give drugs to his wife, threatening to expose he has illegally stolen and given drugs to veterans for physician-assisted suicide. When Teddy steps in and refuses to help them, he finally reports Owen to Bailey. Link’s patient Simon’s lungs get worse, the only way for him to live is for Maggie and Winston to help. Meredith's patient Cora agrees to surgery; despite going well, there is unexpected bleeding when they go to re-attach her organs. Due to the unexpected bleeding, trouble brews for the doctors as they have no blood available to transfuse, given the nationwide blood shortage. They decide to stop the surgery until more blood arrives to avoid additional blood loss.
| 400 | 20 | "You Are the Blood" | Debbie Allen | Krista Vernoff | May 26, 2022 | 4.19 |
The blood shortage at Grey Sloan Memorial continues. Meredith makes a risky decision regarding her patient Cora, but she dies anyway. She wastes the blood the residents were scrambling to collect, putting the residency program in further jeopardy. Owen's decision to steal drugs from the hospital and assist in veterans’ deaths without ever thinking about how it would affect Teddy or the kids, leads them to exit the country as fugitives. Bailey gives them hours to leave before she will report it to the police and accepts their resignations. April Kepner (Sarah Drew) assures Amelia that love comes back around following her break-up with Kai, both having separated after wanting different things. Later Kai showed up in the hospital parking lot and reconciled with Amelia. Jackson Avery (Jesse Williams) and April are together again, and he tries to find Jamarah Blake to save the program. Amelia updates that Catherine's tumor is responding to the chemo trial. Kristen goes into labour, Jo delivers the baby, in time for Simon to see his son before he dies. Jamarah decides to pull the residency program accreditation, believing the people in charge have become a dysfunctional family with no clear leader, causing Bailey to resign in frustration. As Webber and Catherine take a sabbatical, Jackson asks Meredith to act as interim Chief of Surgery, as Meredith's reputation is their only chance at rebuilding. Meredith resents Jackson for asking this of her. Nick is upset with Meredith's decision and leaves after arguing with her. Meredith envisions herself when she was a younger intern, self-judging her for becoming her mother. Meredith then gets up and runs out of the room, calling out for Nick.

== Cast and characters ==
=== Main ===
- Ellen Pompeo as Dr. Meredith Grey
- Chandra Wilson as Dr. Miranda Bailey
- James Pickens Jr. as Dr. Richard Webber
- Kevin McKidd as Dr. Owen Hunt
- Caterina Scorsone as Dr. Amelia Shepherd
- Camilla Luddington as Dr. Jo Wilson
- Kelly McCreary as Dr. Maggie Pierce
- Kim Raver as Dr. Teddy Altman
- Jake Borelli as Dr. Levi Schmitt
- Chris Carmack as Dr. Atticus "Link" Lincoln
- Richard Flood as Dr. Cormac Hayes
- Anthony Hill as Dr. Winston Ndugu
- Scott Speedman as Dr. Nick Marsh

=== Recurring ===
- Kate Walsh as Dr. Addison Montgomery
- Jason George as Dr. Ben Warren
- Abigail Spencer as Dr. Megan Hunt
- Lynn Chen as Dr. Michelle Lin
- Alex Landi as Dr. Nico Kim
- Melissa DuPrey as Dr. Sara Ortiz
- Greg Tarzan Davis as Dr. Jordan Wright
- Peter Gallagher as Dr. David Hamilton
- Jaicy Elliot as Dr. Taryn Helm
- E.R. Fightmaster as Dr. Kai Bartley
- Zaiver Sinnett as Dr. Zander Perez
- Sylvia Kwan as Dr. Mabel Tseng
- Robert I. Mesa as Dr. James Chee
- Stefania Spampinato as Dr. Carina DeLuca
- Aniela Gumbs as Zola Grey Shepherd
- Debbie Allen as Dr. Catherine Fox
- Skylar Astin as Todd Eames
- Rome Flynn as Wendell Ndugu
- Kate Burton as Dr. Ellis Grey
- Bianca A. Santos as Kristen Clark
- Cedric Sanders as Simon Clark

=== Notable guests ===
- Sarah Drew as Dr. April Kepner
- Jesse Williams as Dr. Jackson Avery
- Greg Germann as Dr. Tom Koracick
- Debra Mooney as Evelyn Hunt
- Jaina Lee Ortiz as Lt. Andy Herrera
- Grey Damon as Lt. Jack Gibson
- Barrett Doss as Victoria "Vic" Hughes
- Jay Hayden as Travis Montgomery
- Okieriete Onaodowan as Dean Miller
- Carlos Miranda as Lt. Theo Ruiz
- LaTanya Richardson Jackson as Diane Pierce

•Ashley Holliday Tavares as Heather Young

== Production ==
=== Development ===
On March 25, 2021, Krista Vernoff, who serves as the showrunner and executive producer of Grey's Anatomy and Station 19 signed a two-year deal with ABC to remain on both series through a potential nineteenth season. The deal also keeps Trip the Light Productions, Vernoff's production company, attached to the series. Although no longer writing for the series, after her departure from ABC to Netflix in 2017, series creator Shonda Rhimes remains credited as a showrunner and executive producer. When ABC revealed its schedule for the 2021–22 broadcast season it was announced that the series would hold its previous time slot of Thursdays at 9:00 PM ET, with Station 19 serving as a lead-in. ABC announced its holiday programming schedule in October 2021, where it was revealed that the season would contain both a Thanksgiving and Christmas themed episode to air in November and December, respectively. The season finale was also the series' 400th episode.

=== Casting ===
Kim Raver, Camilla Luddington, and Kevin McKidd each signed a three-year contract in July 2020 keeping them attached to the series through a potential nineteenth season to portray Dr. Teddy Altman, Dr. Jo Wilson, and Dr. Owen Hunt, respectively. The series remaining three original actors Ellen Pompeo, Chandra Wilson, and James Pickens, Jr., who portray Dr. Meredith Grey, Dr. Miranda Bailey, and Dr. Richard Webber, respectively, were all confirmed to be returning for the season. Pompeo signed a one-year contract for her return receiving over US$575,000 per episode and also making her the highest paid actress on broadcast television. Her contract also allows her to retain a producer credit on the series as well as co-executive producer credit on Station 19. Wilson and Pickens reportedly received a significant pay increase from their previous contracts. Giacomo Gianniotti, Jesse Williams, and Greg Germann did not return as series regulars to portray Dr. Andrew DeLuca, Dr. Jackson Avery, and Dr. Tom Koracick, respectively, after departing in the previous season. Meanwhile, Scott Speedman was added to the main cast as Dr. Nick Marsh, a character he had previously portrayed in the fourteenth season as a guest star.

Former series regular Kate Walsh, who also headlined her own spin-off series entitled Private Practice from 2007 until 2013, returned to the series in a recurring capacity. Walsh, who portrays the character Dr. Addison Montgomery, returned in the third episode, "Hotter Than Hell", and had last guest starred in the eighth season episode "If/Then" in 2012. She then appeared in "With a Little Help From My Friends", the episode that immediately followed; and again in Should I Stay or Should I Go". Despite his departure in the seventeenth season, it was reported that Germann was expected to return in later seasons as a guest star which he later did, reprising his role in "Bottle Up and Explode!" and once more in "Legacy." Richard Flood departed as a series regular after the tenth episode of the season, "Living in a House Divided"; Flood was first introduced as a recurring character during the sixteenth season and was promoted to the main cast beginning with the seventeenth. Williams, who previously departed alongside Germann, stated in an interview that he would be open to returning during the season as well. In April 2022 it was confirmed that Williams would return to the series in the season finale alongside former co-star Sarah Drew. Drew portrayed Dr. April Kepner beginning in the sixth season and held the role for nine seasons, eight as a series regular, before departing in the fourteenth season, and briefly returning in the previous season for Williams' departure.

The season also featured the return of recurring cast members Kate Burton as Dr. Ellis Grey and Abigail Spencer as Dr. Megan Hunt, both of whom last appeared in the fifteenth season. New cast members to the series who were cast in recurring roles for the season include Peter Gallagher as Dr. David Hamilton, Lynn Chen as Dr. Michelle Lin, and Greg Tarzan Davis as Dr. Jordan Wright. E.R. Fightmaster, who had guest starred in the season’s second and third episodes as Dr. Kai Bartley, was also promoted to a recurring cast member. Fightmaster and their character Bartley are both non-binary, being the first non-binary actor and character on the series. Skylar Astin and Rome Flynn were cast in recurring roles for the second half of the season to portray Todd Eames, an environmental sciences expert, and Wendell Ndugu, the brother of Hill's character, respectively. Bianca A. Santos and Cedric Sanders were also cast in recurring roles to portray Kristen and Simon Clark, a "married couple in a dire medical situation," for three episodes of the season.

== Reception ==
=== Awards and nominations ===
At the 2nd Hollywood Critics Association TV Awards the season received a nomination for Best Broadcast Network Series, Drama. This award was ultimately won by This Is Us. The season was also awarded The ReFrame Stamp, a certification given to scripted television productions that hire "women or individuals of other underrepresented gender identities/expressions [...] in four out of eight key roles including writer, director, producer, lead, co-leads, and department heads."

=== Ratings ===
Viewership and ratings per episode of Grey's Anatomy season 18
| No. | Title | Air date | Timeslot (ET) | Rating (18–49) | Viewers (millions) | DVR (18–49) | DVR viewers (millions) | Total (18–49) | Total viewers (millions) |
|---|---|---|---|---|---|---|---|---|---|
| 1 | "Here Comes the Sun" | September 30, 2021 | Thursday; 9:00 p.m. | 0.8 | 4.77 | 0.5 | 2.28 | 1.3 | 7.05 (Note: Live+7 ratings were not available, so Live+3 ratings have been used instead.) |
| 2 | "Some Kind of Tomorrow" | October 7, 2021 | Thursday; 9:00 p.m. | 0.6 | 4.04 | 0.5 | 1.94 | 1.2 | 5.98 |
| 3 | "Hotter Than Hell" | October 14, 2021 | Thursday; 9:00 p.m. | 0.6 | 4.05 | 0.6 | 2.30 | 1.2 | 6.35 |
| 4 | "With a Little Help From My Friends" | October 21, 2021 | Thursday; 9:00 p.m. | 0.6 | 3.91 | 0.7 | 2.58 | 1.3 | 6.47 |
| 5 | "Bottle Up and Explode!" | November 11, 2021 | Thursday; 9:00 p.m. | 0.7 | 4.75 | 0.5 | 2.01 | 1.2 | 6.76 |
| 6 | "Everyday Is a Holiday (With You)" | November 18, 2021 | Thursday; 9:00 p.m. | 0.6 | 4.18 | 0.6 | 2.30 | 1.2 | 6.48 |
| 7 | "Today Was A Fairytale" | December 9, 2021 | Thursday; 9:00 p.m. | 0.5 | 3.65 | 0.6 | 2.49 | 1.2 | 6.14 |
| 8 | "It Came Upon a Midnight Clear" | December 16, 2021 | Thursday; 9:00 p.m. | 0.6 | 4.20 | 0.4 | 1.70 | 1.0 | 5.91 |
| 9 | "No Time to Die" | February 24, 2022 | Thursday; 9:00 p.m. | 0.8 | 4.65 | 0.5 | 2.12 | 1.3 | 6.78 |
| 10 | "Living in a House Divided" | March 3, 2022 | Thursday; 9:00 p.m. | 0.6 | 3.95 | 0.4 | 1.91 | 1.0 | 5.85 |
| 11 | "Legacy" | March 10, 2022 | Thursday; 9:00 p.m. | 0.6 | 3.87 | 0.6 | 2.40 | 1.2 | 6.27 |
| 12 | "The Makings of You" | March 17, 2022 | Thursday; 9:00 p.m. | 0.5 | 3.60 | 0.5 | 2.20 | 1.0 | 5.81 |
| 13 | "Put the Squeeze on Me" | March 24, 2022 | Thursday; 9:00 p.m. | 0.6 | 4.24 | 0.5 | 2.19 | 1.1 | 6.44 |
| 14 | "Road Trippin'" | March 31, 2022 | Thursday; 9:00 p.m. | 0.6 | 3.93 | 0.5 | 2.15 | 1.1 | 6.10 |
| 15 | "Put It to the Test" | April 7, 2022 | Thursday; 9:00 p.m. | 0.6 | 4.21 | 0.5 | 2.01 | 1.1 | 6.22 |
| 16 | "Should I Stay or Should I Go" | May 5, 2022 | Thursday; 9:00 p.m. | 0.7 | 3.90 | —N/a | —N/a | —N/a | —N/a |
| 17 | "I'll Cover You" | May 12, 2022 | Thursday; 9:00 p.m. | 0.5 | 3.60 | —N/a | —N/a | —N/a | —N/a |
| 18 | "Stronger Than Hate" | May 19, 2022 | Thursday; 9:00 p.m. | 0.6 | 3.80 | —N/a | —N/a | —N/a | —N/a |
| 19–20 | "Out for Blood" "You Are the Blood" | May 26, 2022 | Thursday; 8:00 p.m. | 0.7 | 4.19 | —N/a | —N/a | —N/a | —N/a |
