= All Tomorrow's Parties (disambiguation) =

"All Tomorrow's Parties" is a song by The Velvet Underground

All Tomorrow's Parties may also refer to:

- "All Tomorrow's Parties" (Grey's Anatomy), an episode of the TV series Grey's Anatomy
- All Tomorrow's Parties (festival), an annual festival in England
  - All Tomorrow's Parties (2009 film), a documentary about the music festival
- All Tomorrow's Parties (2003 film), a Chinese film
- All Tomorrow's Parties (novel), a novel by William Gibson
- "All Tomorrow's Parties" (One Tree Hill episode), an episode of the TV series One Tree Hill
- "All Tomorrow's Parties", fifth episode of the U.S. TV series The Tomorrow People

== See also ==
- All Tomorrows
