= Station 19 season 5 =

Station 19
- Season 5
- Promotional poster for the fifth season of Station 19
- Showrunner: Krista Vernoff
- Starring: Jaina Lee Ortiz; Jason George; Boris Kodjoe; Grey Damon; Barrett Doss; Jay Hayden; Okieriete Onaodowan; Danielle Savre; Stefania Spampinato; Carlos Miranda
- No. of episodes: 18

Release
- Original network: ABC
- Original release: September 30, 2021 – May 19, 2022

Season chronology
- ← Previous; Season 4 Next → Season 6

The fifth season of the American television action-drama Station 19, spin off of Grey's Anatomy, began airing in the United States on the American Broadcasting Company (ABC) on September 30, 2021, and concluded on May 19, 2022. The season was produced by ABC Signature, in association with Shondaland Production Company and Trip the Light Productions.

This is the first season with Carlos Miranda as a series regular after recurring the previous season. This is also the last season to feature Okieriete Onaodowan as a series regular. On January 11, 2022, ABC renewed the series for a sixth season.

Station 19 centers around the professional and personal lives of the firefighters of the fictional Station 19 of the Seattle Fire Department. Several plot points connect to parent series Grey's Anatomy through fictional crossover events.

== Episodes ==
List of Station 19 season 5 episodes
No. overall	No. in season	Title	Directed by	Written by	Original release date	Prod. code	U.S. viewers (millions)
60	1	"Phoenix from the Flame"	Stacey K. Black	Krista Vernoff	September 30, 2021	501	5.04
A title card reveals that while the pandemic isn't over in real life, the show is presenting a look at the future that the show hopes for. We've jumped a year, and Herrera and Sullivan are on the rocks. Flashbacks show the fallout at the Carina/Maya wedding, as the two of them (and Andy) left the wedding to confront the chief about his decision to relieve Maya of her position as captain. He threatens to transfer every other member of Station 19 if she persists in fighting his decision. She relents, but he still says Andy will be transferred to Station 23. They return to the wedding dejected, but determined to have a good time. In the present, the team is helping with an event at a park where a bunch of extremely intoxicated people are lighting off fireworks. One manages to blow half of his face off, but the chaos of the whole situation makes it so nothing goes easily for the team. The new captain leaves the engine open, and one of the drunk partiers steals it and immediately wrecks it. It eventually catches fire, and Andy (having responded with her new 23 team, where she is the only woman) has to watch her father's memorial on the engine burn. The new captain shows a fairly callous attitude towards the sentimentality that 19 has for the engine. Note : This episode begins a crossover event that concludes on Grey's Anatomy season 18 episode 1.
61	2	"Can't Feel My Face"	Peter Paige	Kiley Donovan	October 7, 2021	502	4.29
The team is called to a house fire that turns out to be a basement drug lab fire. Several members of 19 are rendered unconscious by the fumes. Sullivan wakes up, shakes it off, and is able to carry people out. Some teens are shown to be filming the scene where the down firefighters are being revived, and Sullivan--now shirtless--berates the kids and smashes one's phone in the process. The other kid's video goes viral, and people start calling Sullivan "Fire Zaddy." As the whole team goes day-drinking at a recently reopened Joe's Bar to celebrate, Sullivan learns of his viral status soon after being served (at work) with divorce papers by Herrera. He orders himself a scotch but ultimately decides not to drink it. Outside the bar, Herrera runs into Beckett, the new captain, who entreats him to go home with her.
62	3	"Too Darn Hot"	Michael Medico	Rochelle Zimmerman	October 14, 2021	503	4.29
It is exceptionally hot in Seattle, leading to all sorts of complications for its citizens and its firefighters. Andy's sex hangover from going home with newly minted Captain Sean Beckett plagues her, as she feels guilt about recent interactions with Sullivan, who is going viral in the "Fire Zaddy" video. An attempted PR stunt led by the new department PR director, involving pushing the new engine into the garage, would have been a success if the engine hadn't burned the hands of those who showed up to help. Ben's adopted son, Joey, rides along with Ben and Jack in the aid car, and the first call is to a homeless encampment. The man experiencing heart failure is someone Joey knows, and Joey argues against life-saving measures because he knows his friend is a DNR. Ben can't stop because he doesn't have official confirmation, and as a doctor and first responder, he might be willing to bend the rules to save a life, but not to end one. Bishop and Carina continue to argue about Maya's decision not to have children. Sullivan is still reeling from the divorce papers. Ben surprises Joey by getting his foster siblings to the make-up event to push the engine into the station, which is complete with a water fight to cool everyone down.
63	4	"100% or Nothing"	Sheelin Choksey	Emily Culver	October 21, 2021	504	4.65
Therapist Dr. Diane Lewis is back in the building to assist in Miller's new initiative by teaching crisis intervention training (CIT) to Stations 19 & 23. The firefighters joke their way through the training while fielding various calls. Sullivan and Bishop respond to a house call where an on-the-rocks married couple foreshadows many things relevant to Sullivan's and Bishop's own marriages. Jack goes on a mental health call with the crisis team and finds he has an aptitude for the work while working with a young autistic man. Dr. Lewis tells Miller that his program will help a lot of people. Miller is still frustrated by Vic and Theo being together and finds them making out in the station. Sullivan gives Herrera the signed divorce papers.
64	5	"Things We Lost in the Fire"	Daryn Okada	Henry Robles	November 11, 2021	505	4.58
Miller plans to start another Crisis One program in Oakland and asks Vic to join him, but she declines. Jack plans to open a free clinic at the station with Carina's help. The firefighters are called to a neighborhood gas line explosion. As Vic fights the fire from a ladder, a live wire strikes her, rendering her unconscious. Miller resuscitates Vic and brings her to the ground, and she is transported to the hospital. Because the fire is spreading along an underground pipeline, a nearby house suddenly explodes, impaling the captain of Station 23 and severely injuring Miller. Ben tries to resuscitate Miller as he is rushed to Grey Sloan Memorial. Note : This episode begins a crossover event that concludes on Grey's Anatomy season 18 episode 5.
65	6	"Little Girl Blue"	Diana C. Valentine	Tyrone Finch & Meghann Plunkett	November 18, 2021	506	4.85
As Thanksgiving arrives, the firefighters are coping with the death of Dean Miller. Vic is wearing a heart monitor due to her electrocution and talks with Dr. Diane Lewis to process Miller's death. Travis confronts his father and forces him to confess that he is gay. Bishop decides that she is ready to have a baby with Carina. Jack decides to make Thanksgiving dinner at the station, but when it is ruined, Jack has a breakdown. At Station 23, Andy and Theo are making dinner for their injured captain, and Andy is comparing her situation with Pru's. They argue about Miller being in love with Vic, but they come to an understanding. Dean's father arrives and announces that he and his wife will be fighting Ben and Miranda for custody of Pru.
66	7	"A House Is Not a Home"	David Greenspan	Leah Gonzalez	December 9, 2021	507	4.07
Dean's parents propose that Pru would be better off with them since they are wealthy. Miranda is considering acceptance, but Warren argues that Dean wanted them to raise her. Later, Dean's parents call Miranda because Pru was crying out for her. Travis' mother is leaving his father and apologizes for not standing up for Travis when he was growing up. Maya wants Carina to carry the baby since she wants it more. Andy is made interim captain of Station 23 and struggles to get the team to follow her orders during a call. Sullivan is substituting for the day, and he and Theo discuss how being in a relationship with another firefighter is not a good idea. Andy later admits to Sullivan that she slept with Beckett. Dean's parents evict Jack from Dean's boathouse, and he and Vic end up destroying her bathroom to cope with Dean's death. They kiss before Jack breaks it off.
67	8	"All I Want for Christmas Is You"	Peter Paige	Zaiver Sinnett	December 16, 2021	508	4.69
Vic is cleared by her doctor to go to work, but is assigned desk duty by Captain Beckett. Beckett announces that a new fire chief has been appointed, a woman, but does not disclose her identity. Warren, Bishop, Sullivan, Ruiz, and Montgomery go to save a man who is stuck wedged between two cars. His rescue requires the use of PRT, which, after some deliberation, is approved by the new fire chief. Vic is saved from desk duty by a Crisis One call, where she, Emmett, and Gibson find a distraught woman with a panic attack, which turns out to be a result of domestic abuse. Vic compromises the situation with the woman, which gets her benched by Jack. She tells Theo that she kissed Jack. Andy and Carina stay at the station to prepare toys for Toys for Tots. In the end, everyone is at the station for a Christmas evening, when Maya and Carina announce they are going to have a baby.
68	9	"Started from the Bottom"	Paula Hunziker	Emily Culver	February 24, 2022	509	4.98
Both Stations 19 and 23 are preparing for the arrival of the new chief, who is revealed to be Natasha Ross, Sullivan's former colleague in the Marines. Ross announces funding for Dean Miller's health initiative program. Both stations receive a call about a car that has rolled off a cliff. Just before leaving, Warren receives a call stating that Owen Hunt from Grey Sloan Memorial is in the car. Carina, Jack, and Vic come up with more ways to fund the program after a walk-in girl, who has just gotten her first period, and her brother visit. Warren goes against Herrera's orders and scales the cliff, finding one dead civilian and Hunt trapped in the car with an open wound. After the team successfully opens the car, Hunt is transported to the top of the cliff using the ladder. Warren hitches a ride, which gets him reprimanded by Captain Beckett and Acting Captain Herrera in front of Chief Ross. After they return to the station, Ross compliments 19 on a good job and promotes Sullivan to lieutenant. Hughes finds out she's pregnant. Note : This episode begins a crossover event that concludes on Grey's Anatomy season 18 episode 9.
69	10	"Searching for the Ghost"	Oliver Bokelberg	Staci Okunola	March 3, 2022	510	4.46
The team organizes a 10K fundraiser. Diane sees Ben at the event and reminds him, that he needs to attend sessions with her to get cleared for future calls. Vic wants to get a surgical abortion, but Carina tells her she needs to wait at least one more week. Ruiz is unsure about his relationship with Hughes and asks Herrera to keep an eye on her. The team gets called to a house that is haunted, which two people walked into but haven't come out. Jack tells Carina and Ben he thinks the health initiative program should not have doctors, when they get a walk-in family. Montgomery and Ruiz fall down a trap door in the haunted house. Bishop and Sullivan stumble upon a man covered by a part of collapsed ceiling. They rescue him and find out that Captain Beckett has no idea where Montgomery and Ruiz are. Hughes and Herrera visit Miller's houseboat, which is now empty and up for sale. After rescuing both people from the house, Sullivan gives negative feedback to Captain Beckett about his orders. At the station, Sullivan goes to visit Beckett, who is asleep, so Sullivan looks through his documents and finds a hidden bottle of alcohol. Hughes decides to take a pill for the abortion instead of waiting for the surgery.
70	11	"The Little Things You Do Together"	Tessa Blake	Kiley Donovan & Rochelle Zimmerman	March 10, 2022	511	4.25
Sullivan and Ross go out for dinner and meet Beckett on the street. Carina and Maya are deciding who the donor of the sperm will be. Hughes visits Dr. DeLuca to get the pill for her abortion. She then goes home with Theo and they fight about their relationship, after which they stay together for the rest of the day. Montgomery and Herrera receive a call and come to a man that spills gasoline on himself, threatening to burn himself. During the call, Montgomery voices his feelings about his own relationship, which Dixon hears. Herrera and Gibson agree to keep each other out of messy relationships. Maya tells Carina she wants the sperm donor to be someone they know.
71	12	"In My Tree" "Who's Gonna Miss Me?"	Tamika Miller	Daniel K. Hoh	March 17, 2022	512	4.24
Station 19 sets up the walk-in health check-up, the Dean Miller Memorial Clinic, for the first time. Warren is watched by a guardian ad litem for the day. Emmett is not returning Travis' calls. Herrera and her team is called to a woman, apparently a parachutist, stuck in a tree. Ross informs Bishop she wants to talk about her temporary demotion. Bishop asks Sullivan for help with her promotion. Ross compliments Gibson on handling the Memorial Clinic on the first day. Emmett comes to the station and breaks up with Travis. Herrera talks to Ross in hopes of starting up PRT again and Ross decides to shut down station 23 due to budget issues.
72	13	"Cold Blue Steel and Sweet Fire"	Paris Barclay	Alex Fernandez	March 24, 2022	513	4.60
Ross informs Station 23 of its closing. Travis, Vic, and Emmett receive a Crisis One call to evict a tenant, which makes things awkward when Travis and Emmett finally meet again. Ross informs Bishop she is not reinstating her as a captain. The Millers decide that Warren and Bailey should get full exclusive guardianship of Pru with some rules, which Bailey does not agree with. Both station 19 and 23 get called to a burning factory. Sullivan informs Ross of Beckett's drinking problem. The Millers want Warren to stop firefighting.
73	14	"Alone in the Dark"	Stacey K. Black	Zaiver Sinnett	March 31, 2022	514	4.44
Station 23 is officially closed, so the team goes for a drink. Emmett takes Travis to his parents' home for his father's birthday, without telling him that of the birthday. Beckett gets tested for potential alcohol consumption while on the job. Station 19's team gets called to a fire. Dixon's wife reveals to Travis and Emmett that Dixon is running for mayor. She also reveals Dixon plans to cancel Crisis One and he and Montgomery argue over it. Upon returning from the call, Warren announces that he and Bailey got full custody of Pru. Beckett tells the team he was accused of drinking on the job and that the test came back clean. He punishes the team for the intervention, after which Sullivan admits he told Chief Ross about the potential drinking problem. Andy reveals to the rest of the team of station 23 that she asked Chief Ross for a transfer to station 19, which eventually led to the station 23 closing and the rest of the team, including Theo, leaves her alone in the bar. The only person to stay is Maddox's friend Jeremy, who makes a connection with Andy and attempts to sexually assault her.
74	15	"When the Party's Over"	Daryn Okada	Meghann Plunkett	April 7, 2022	515	4.52
Montgomery joins the team from station 23 in the bar. Bishop and DeLuca ask Gibson to be the sperm donor. Herrera runs into them, they take her in to check her out and talk. She tells them to check on Jeremy, who Hughes, Bishop, and Sullivan find unresponsive. Meanwhile, Herrera talks to police officers and Warren request a physical examination for her. Andy has flashbacks to her childhood, where she was tripped by a boy and remembers her mother trying to protect her. Jeremy is transported to Grey Sloan Memorial, but does not make it. Hughes calls Ruiz to tell him. Two homicide detectives come to station 19 to talk to Andy. Gibson agrees to be the sperm donor. Herrera is taken into custody.
75	16	"Death and the Maiden"	Jason George	Rochelle Zimmerman & Leah Gonzalez	May 5, 2022	516	4.28
Herrera is on a trial for murder. Andy's mom visits the fire station. Ruiz is assigned to station 19 and the team is called to a fire in a sweatshop. Dixon appears and talks to the owner of the sweatshop. Upon arrival of Chief Ross to the fire, Montgomery tries to inform her of the situation and ends up yelling at Dixon. Gibson learns he has a brother. Herrera is suspended from work until the trial is over and when she arrives at home, her mother is waiting for her. She tells her she was assaulted while at the Fire Academy. Ruiz suggests Montgomery should run for mayor, opposing Dixon.
76	17	"The Road You Didn't Take"	Paula Hunziker	Henry Robles & Staci Okunola	May 12, 2022	517	3.95
The station holds another Memorial Clinic day. Herrera and Gibson take a road trip to meet Gibson's brother. The date for DeLuca's green card interview is announced. Crisis One gets a call to a possible kidnapping within a family. Gibson learns his brother grew up with his parents as well as other siblings. Montgomery considers running for mayor.
77	18	"Crawl Out Through the Fallout"	Stacey K. Black	Kiley Donovan	May 19, 2022	518	4.28
Gibson and Herrera decide to track down other victims of Jeremy's assaults. DeLuca has her green card interview. Station 19 is called to a crash between a school bus and a truck transporting radioactive cesium. Herrera visits one of Jeremy's victims at work. The truck driver decides to move the cesium so that the children in the school bus can be rescued. Montgomery decides to run for mayor and asks for support from Chief Ross, who agrees to personally, but not professionally, endorse him. Beckett decides to get sober and tells Sullivan. Jeremy's other victim decides to testify against him, which results in the charges against Herrera being dropped. The station has a party for little Pru. Bishop threatens to report Chief Ross for sleeping with Sullivan unless she gets her job back. Ross reveals to Herrera that a lieutenant spot is open, which was freed by Gibson.

== Cast and characters ==
=== Main ===
- Jaina Lee Ortiz as Andrea "Andy" Herrera
- Jason George as Benjamin "Ben" Warren
- Boris Kodjoe as Robert Sullivan
- Grey Damon as Jack Gibson
- Barrett Doss as Victoria "Vic" Hughes
- Jay Hayden as Travis Montgomery
- Okieriete Onaodowan as Dean Miller
- Danielle Savre as Maya DeLuca-Bishop
- Stefania Spampinato as Dr. Carina DeLuca-Bishop
- Carlos Miranda as Theodore "Theo" Ruiz

=== Recurring ===
- Lachlan Buchanan as Emmett Dixon
- Josh Randall as Fire Captain Sean Beckett
- Alain Uy as Captain Pat Aquino
- Barbara Eve Harris as Ifeya Miller
- Lindsey Gort as Ingrid Saunders
- Robert Curtis Brown as Paul Montgomery
- Natasha Ward as Deja Duval
- Jeffrey D. Sams as Bill Miller
- Chandra Wilson as Dr. Miranda Bailey
- Merle Dandridge as Fire Chief Natasha Ross
- Jennifer Jalene as Luisa Berrol

=== Notable guests ===
- James Pickens Jr. as Dr. Richard Webber
- Tracie Thoms as Dr. Diane Lewis
- Jeanne Sakata as Nari Montgomery
- Jayne Taini as Marsha Smith
- Kevin McKidd as Dr. Owen Hunt
- Kim Raver as Dr. Teddy Altman
- Jaicy Elliot as Dr. Taryn Helm
- Pat Healy as Michael Dixon
- BJ Tanner as William George "Tuck" Jones

== Production ==
=== Development ===
On May 10, 2021, ABC renewed the series for a fifth season. Shonda Rhimes and Betsy Beers returned as executive producers. Krista Vernoff returned as showrunner as part of a two-year deal with ABC. Following the previous season, which takes place during the COVID-19 pandemic, this season takes place in a post-pandemic world. ABC announced its holiday programming schedule in October 2021, where it was revealed that the season would contain both a Thanksgiving and Christmas themed episode to air in November and December, respectively. In January 2022, production was delayed several days due to the Omicron variant of the SARS-CoV-2 virus. In February 2022, Vernoff described the back half of the season to be a darker story that would be fun for the actors.

=== Casting ===
The entire main cast from the fourth season returned for the fifth season. Carlos Miranda was upped to series regular after recurring the previous season. Okieriete Onaodowan departed as a series regular after the fifth episode of the season after requesting to leave at the end of the previous season. Merle Dandridge was later cast in a recurring role as the new fire chief.

== Release ==
When the 2021–22 United States network television schedule was announced, Station 19 would remain on Thursdays at 8:00 PM. The season premiered on September 30, 2021 with a crossover event. The midseason finale aired on December 16, 2021. The season continued on February 24, 2022 with another crossover event with Grey's Anatomy. The season finale aired on May 19.

== Reception ==
=== Awards and nominations ===
Jaina Lee Ortiz received an honorable mention for TVLine's Performer of the Week for her performance in "When the Party's Over". Grey Damon received an honorable mention for TVLine's Performer of the Week for his performance in "The Road You Didn't Take". The season was also awarded The ReFrame Stamp, a certification given to scripted television productions that hire "women or individuals of other underrepresented gender identities/expressions [...] in four out of eight key roles including writer, director, producer, lead, co-leads, and department heads."

=== Ratings ===
The season was ABC's second most-watched scripted television series during the 2021–2022 television season in the 18-49 demographic. Throughout its broadcast, in same-day viewership, the season averaged a 0.61 rating (Note: In Nielsen ratings, a rating is a fraction of the total number of households with televisions compared to the number of television sets tuned into a specific program.) in the 18–49 demographic and 4.47 million viewers, down 26 and 14 percent, respectively, from the previous season. In Live+7 (Note: Live+7 data includes the number of viewers watching episodes within seven days of its original broadcast by means of DVR and streaming video on demand.) the season averaged a 0.9 rating in the 18–49 demographic and 6.2 million viewers, down 31 and 13 percent from the fourth season.

Viewership and ratings per episode of Station 19 season 5
No.	Title	Air date	Rating (18–49)	Viewers (millions)	DVR (18–49)	DVR viewers (millions)	Total (18–49)	Total viewers (millions)
1	"Phoenix from the Flame"	September 30, 2021	0.8	5.04	0.3	1.66	1.0	6.70 (Note: Live+7 ratings were not available, so Live+3 ratings have been used instead.)
2	"Can't Feel My Face"	October 7, 2021	0.6	4.29	0.3	1.29	0.8	5.59
3	"Too Darn Hot"	October 14, 2021	0.6	4.29	0.3	1.54	0.8	5.83
4	"100% or Nothing"	October 21, 2021	0.6	4.65	0.3	1.52	0.9	6.17
5	"Things We Lost in the Fire"	November 11, 2021	0.6	4.58	0.3	1.56	0.9	6.15
6	"Little Girl Blue"	November 18, 2021	0.7	4.85	0.3	1.65	1.0	6.49
7	"A House Is Not a Home"	December 9, 2021	0.6	4.07	0.3	1.75	0.9	5.82
8	"All I Want for Christmas Is You"	December 16, 2021	0.6	4.69	0.2	1.21	0.8	5.90
9	"Started from the Bottom"	February 24, 2022	0.8	4.98	0.3	1.53	1.0	6.51
10	"Searching for the Ghost"	March 3, 2022	0.7	4.46	0.2	1.48	0.9	5.94
11	"The Little Things You Do Together"	March 10, 2022	0.6	4.25	0.3	1.79	0.9	6.05
12	"In My Tree"	March 17, 2022	0.5	4.24	0.3	1.80	0.8	6.04
13	"Cold Blue Steel and Sweet Fire"	March 24, 2022	0.6	4.60	0.3	1.66	0.9	6.26
14	"Alone in the Dark"	March 31, 2022	0.6	4.44	0.3	1.52	0.8	5.96
15	"When the Party's Over"	April 7, 2022	0.6	4.52	0.2	1.43	0.9	5.95
16	"Death and the Maiden"	May 5, 2022	0.6	4.28	—N/a	—N/a	—N/a	—N/a
17	"The Road You Didn't Take"	May 12, 2022	0.5	3.95	—N/a	—N/a	—N/a	—N/a
18	"Crawl Out Through the Fallout"	May 19, 2022	0.6	4.28	—N/a	—N/a	—N/a	—N/a
