= Shondaland =

American television production company

- Type: Private
- Industry: Television production
- Founded: 2005; 21 years ago, in Los Angeles, California
- Founder: Shonda Rhimes
- Headquarters: Los Angeles, California, U.S.
- Key people: Shonda Rhimes (CEO); Betsy Beers
- Products: Grey's Anatomy (2005–present); Private Practice (2007–2013); Off the Map (2011); Scandal (2012–2018); How to Get Away with Murder (2014–2020); The Catch (2016–2017); Still Star-Crossed (2017); For the People (2018–2019); Station 19 (2018–2024); Bridgerton (2020–present); Inventing Anna (2022); Queen Charlotte: A Bridgerton Story (2023); The Residence (2025)
- Owner: Shonda Rhimes
- Website: Official website Official website

Shondaland (stylized as ShondaLand from 2005 to 2016 and shondaland thereafter) is an American television production company founded by television writer and producer Shonda Rhimes. She founded it to be one of the production companies of her first series, the medical drama Grey's Anatomy in 2005. It has since gone on to produce Rhimes's other creations, Grey's spinoff Private Practice and the political drama Scandal, and her other productions—the short-lived Off the Map, the Viola Davis-starring legal thriller How to Get Away with Murder, and the crime thriller The Catch—all of which are co-produced with ABC Studios and air on ABC. As of 2017, it has a partnership affiliation with Netflix creating shows like Bridgerton and the spin-off Queen Charlotte: A Bridgerton Story.

== History ==
=== Programming block ===
In 2014, the ABC network programmed its entire Thursday primetime lineup with television series produced by Shondaland, then branded the Shondaland-filled programming block as "Thank God It's Thursday," also referred to in its shortened form, TGIT. This echoes ABC's former TGIF branding of its Friday night family sitcoms and NBC's Must See TV promotion of formidable Thursday night television hits in the 1990s. Thursday is an especially important night for American television networks because it is the last chance for advertisers of weekend purchases, like movies and cars, to reach a large TV audience, and networks schedule highly rated programming for the night to attract those advertising dollars. The Associated Press called Rhimes' reign of an entire night of network television "unmatched in TV history."

=== Productions ===
The first series produced by Shondaland is Grey's Anatomy, which premiered on March 27, 2005, and was recently renewed for its 22nd season. In 2007, Private Practice premiered, and lasted for six seasons, until its final broadcast, on January 22, 2013. The third installment, Off the Map, was created by Jenna Bans and lasted for only one season, in 2011. Scandal and How to Get Away with Murder, premiered in 2012 and 2014, respectively, with Scandal airing its final episode on April 19, 2018, and How to Get Away with Murder airing its final episode on May 14, 2020. The comedy-driven crime drama The Catch aired for two seasons and received generally positive reviews from critics. The period drama Still Star-Crossed premiered on May 29, 2017, and was cancelled after one season. The legal drama For the People, created by Paul William Davies and set to premiere in the 2017–18 television season, is the eighth television series produced by Shondaland. In May 2019, it was cancelled after two seasons. It was announced on January 3, 2018, that Scandal and How to Get Away With Murder would crossover with one another in Shondaland's first crossover event (excluding spin-offs). In March 22, 2018, a second Grey's Anatomy spin-off, Station 19, premiered. This firefighter procedural drama lasted for seven seasons, broadcasting its final episode on May 30, 2024. On May 19, 2026, ABC ordered a new Grey's Anatomy spinoff that will be set in Texas. It is slated to premiere in 2027.

== Website ==
In 2017, Shondaland launched the lifestyle website Shondaland.com in partnership with Hearst.

== Initiatives ==
Shonda Rhimes shares her knowledge with aspiring screenwriters and producers through Shondaland and initiatives for her MasterClass.com program.

Shondaland partnered with Seriesfest in 2019 to launch the Women's Directing Mentorship, a competition designed to discover aspiring female directors. The Seriesfest panel included Shondaland's Head of Fiction Alison Eakle, Akua Murphy, Katie Lowes and Anna Deavere Smith. The first Shondaland Women's Directing Mentorship was awarded to Rachel Myers.

In January 2020, it was announced that Shonda Rhimes had partnered with iHeartMedia to launch Shondaland Audio.

== Filmography ==
=== Television series ===
Series	Television seasons																						No. of episodes
Series	2004–05	2005–06	2006–07	2007–08	2008–09	2009–10	2010–11	2011–12	2012–13	2013–14	2014–15	2015–16	2016–17	2017–18	2018–19	2019–20	2020–21	2021–22	2022–23	2023–24	2024–25	2025–26	No. of episodes
Grey's Anatomy	1	2	3	4	5	6	7	8	9	10	11	12	13	14	15	16	17	18	19	20	21	22	474
Private Practice				1	2	3	4	5	6														111
Off the Map							1																13
Scandal								1	2	3	4	5	6	7									124
How to Get Away with Murder											1	2	3	4	5	6							90
The Catch												1	2										20
Still Star-Crossed														1									7
For the People															1	2							20
Station 19														1	2	3	4	5	6	7			105
Bridgerton																	1	2		3		4	32
Inventing Anna																		1					9
Queen Charlotte: A Bridgerton Story																			1				6
The Residence																					1		8

== Recurring actors ==
Some actors appear in more than one television show produced by Shondaland. Currently, Liza Weil, Mimi Kennedy, John Getz, José Zúñiga, Cynthia Stevenson, Faran Tahir and Anthony Hill are the only actors to make appearances in four shows.

= Main role = Recurring role

Work Actor	Grey's Anatomy	Private Practice	Off the Map	Scandal	How to Get Away with Murder	The Catch	Still Star-Crossed	For the People	Station 19	Bridgerton	Inventing Anna
Mark Adair-Rios	David Morris		Armando Cruz		Dr. Erik Turner						
Paul Adelstein	Cooper Freedman	Cooper Freedman		Leo Bergen							
Kevin Alejandro	Officer Dan Pruitt					Nathan Ashmore					
Amrapali Ambegaokar	Intern Dani			Jessica							
David Andrews				George Reed		Tony Ellis					
Alexis Floyd	Simone Griffith										Neff Davis
Juan Antonio	Hot guy				Levi						
Michael Arden	Neal Hannigan		Pher								
Wes Armstrong				Chris Armstrong	Bill						
Mackenzie Astin	Danny Wilson	Dan Meyer		Noah Baker							
Laila Ayad	Laura Morgan			Charlotte Reid							
Steven W. Bailey	Joe/Jeremy	Joe		Noah Elliot							
Michael Beach	Mr. Baker							Douglas Delap			
Alexandra Billings	Donna Gibson				Jill Hartford						
Nazanin Boniadi	Amrita			Adnan Salif							
Jake Borelli	Dr. Levi Schmitt								Dr. Levi Schmitt		
Jayne Brook	Gwen Graber	Dr. Meg Porter	Lynn								
Alan Brooks				Chairman Mike Snedeker	Grant Hapstall						
Jasmin Savoy Brown	Amanda Joseph							Allison Adams			
Dan Bucatinsky	Jeffrey			James Novak							
David Burke	Don	Mr. Spencer			Mr. Thomas						
John Burke				Paul Mosley	ADA Vince Travers						
Jere Burns	Ben Bosco		Richie Salerno								
Kate Burton	Ellis Grey			Sally Langston							Nora
Tisha Campbell-Martin	Lila's mother	Pam Reiter									
Catherine Carlen				Governor Kelly Rauch	Judge Emily Hargrove						
Justin Chambers	Alex Karev	Alex Karev									
Jennifer Christopher				Civilian	Gemma Walsh						
Shannon Cochran	Mary Singleton		Marian Cooper	Susan Sawyer							
Josh Crotty				Secret Service agent		Evan Connors					
Valerie Cruz	Zona Cruz		Dr. Zee Alvarez	Carolina Flores							
Steven Culp	Dr. Darren Parker				Victor Lesher						
Eric Dane	Dr. Mark Sloan	Dr. Mark Sloan									
Viola Davis				Annalise Keating	Annalise Keating						
Patrick Dempsey	Derek Shepherd	Derek Shepherd									
David Denman	Rick Jacobs				Kevin Murphy						
Kiran Deol	Young woman				Dr. Lira						
Sharmila Devar	Female Intern	Lisa									
Taye Diggs	Dr. Sam Bennett	Dr. Sam Bennett									
Marika Domińczyk	Dr. Eliza Minnick										Talia
Jeff Doucette	Warren Sterman			Warden	Judge George Danvers						
Matthew Downs	Frank				Agent Anthony Fain						
Julie Dretzin	Carmen Hall				FBI Agent			Judge Diane Barish			
Sarah Drew	April Kepner	Judy									
Stacy Edwards	Kathleen Wheeler	Maria Wilson			Gretchen Thomas						
Tony Elias		Collin			Jimmy Wordshaw						
Scott Foley	Henry Burton			Jake Ballard							
Amanda Foreman	Nora	Katie Kent				Susan Bailey					
Jason George	Dr. Ben Warren		Dr. Otis Cole						Dr. Ben Warren		
John Getz	Michael Breyers	Mr. Kent		Patrick Keating	David Dolan						
Zach Gilford	Charlie Lowell		Dr. Tommy Fuller								
Erica Gimpel	Bethany Anderson					Renée Etheridge					
Mary Pat Gleason	Marge Walker			Betsy Ray	Robin Laforge						
Misha Gonz-Cirkl	Social worker				Detective Lana Ramos						
Nicholas Gonzalez	Clark West		Mateo		Dominic						
April Grace	Greta's Sister		Fran		Judge Renee Garret						
Allie Grant	Alana	Julie									
Jake Green	Pete Gibson					Seth Hamilton					
Tim Griffin	Ronny O'Malley				AUSA Caleb Abernathy						
Caitlainne Rose Gurreri	Lori					Marie Sherwood					
Barbara Eve Harris		Melinda Stinson			Judge Fiona Pruitt						
Roxanne Hart	Dana Seabury	Ellen Miller			Sylvia Mahoney						
Jay Hayden						Danny Yoon			Travis Montgomery		
Pat Healy	Tom Russell				Dennis				Michael Dixon		
Martin Henderson	Dr. Nathan Riggs		Dr. Ben Keeton								
Anthony Hill	Dr. Winston Ndugu				Noah			Guy Watson	Neil		
Jerrika Hinton	Stephanie Edwards			Hannah							
Judith Hoag	Rhada Douglas	Angie McConnell	Margie Packard								
Joe Holt	Steve Beck			Defense Secretary							
Leslie Hope		Linda	Bridget Clemmons						Battalion Chief Frankel		
Eamon Hunt	Judge				Judge Colton Lee						
Jackson Hurst	Thomas Archibald			Congressman Jacob Shaw		Mario Visconti					
Jay Jackson				Mike Waters/News anchor		BNC News anchor					
Anne-Marie Johnson	Judge Madeline Kane							Senator Knox			
Danielle Kennedy	Angry woman				Nurse						
Mimi Kennedy	Verna Bradley	Eleanor Bergin		Sharon Marquette		Virginia Foster					
Anna Khaja		Cooper's Lawyer						Vera Simmons			
Aja Naomi King				Michaela Pratt	Michaela Pratt						
David L. King					Dr. Belridge	William Etheridge					
T. R. Knight	Dr. George O'Malley					Tommy Vaughan					
Nicola Lambo				Sienna Rogers		Saleswoman					
Damien Leake				Judge Leo Theroux	Dr. Healy						
Chyler Leigh	Dr. Lexie Grey										
Chris Lowell		William "Dell" Parker									Noah
Katie Lowes	Blood donor	Kendra Walker/Kira		Quinn Perkins							Rachel
Justina Machado	Anna Nyles	Stephanie Kemp	Teresa								
Roma Maffia	Roberta Thompson		Matilda								
Joshua Malina	Seth Hammer	Jason Windsor		David Rosen							Henrick Knight
Cheech Marin	Otis Sharon		Papa Ucumari								
Nelson Mashita	Proctor				Judge Gene Escobar						
Susan May Pratt		Barbara	Becky								
Mary McCormack				Lisa Elliot				Chloe Daniels			
Kelly McCreary	Maggie Pierce			Clare Tucker					Maggie Pierce		
Michael McGrady	Stanley Singer				AUSA Hobbs						
Thomas G. McMahon				Government goon	Lloyd						
Joan McMurtrey	Zoey Glass	Jennifer Debray			Helena Hapstall						
Abby Miller	Kate Shaw	Simone Parker				Gwen Ericsson					
Dylan Minnette	Ryan			Jerry Grant Jr.							
Debra Mooney	Evelyn Hunt	Sylvie		Verna Thornton							Judge
Judith Moreland	Mrs. Baer				Judge Virginia Wilder						
George Newbern	Stan Mercer	Brian Reynolds		Charlie							
Niko Terho	Lucas Adams								Lucas Adams		
Harry Shum Jr.	Benson Kwan								Benson Kwan		
Paula Newsome	Mrs. Sturgeon				Joyce Robinson						
Dean Norris	Vince		Morris Cooper								
Amy Okuda	Chelsea Ansell				Catherine Hapstall						
Enuka Okuma	Teresa Brotherton				Nia Lahey						
Regé-Jean Page								Leonard Knox		Simon Basset, the Duke of Hastings	
April Parker Jones				Doctor	Detective Claire Bryce						
Jeff Perry	Thatcher Grey			Cyrus Beene							Lou
Zoe Perry	Katy Noonan	Lisa		Samantha Ruland							
Rick Peters	Sean Greene				Detective						
Nicole Pettis					Court crier	Robin					
James Pickens Jr.	Richard Webber	Richard Webber									
Amy Pietz		Isabelle			Sharon Remini						
Ellen Pompeo	Meredith Grey								Meredith Grey		
Adina Porter	Dr. Ramsey	Stacy Hatcher				FBI Agent Emily Clark					
Sally Pressman	Young Dr. Ellis Grey			Candace Marcus		Stephanie Duncan					
Josh Randall	William	Carl							Captain. Sean Beckett		
Medalion Rahimi						Princess Zara Al-Salim	Princess Isabella				
Ben Rappaport								Seth Oliver			Billy McFarland
Dalila Ali Rajah	Leanne				Judy						
Jill Remez	April's examiner				Lucinda Blair						
Ron Roggé	Fire captain				Detective Paul Reed						
Cristine Rose		Mrs. Freedman			Judge Wenona Sansbury						
Jeffrey D. Sams	Andre Barrett				District Attorney						
Caterina Scorsone	Amelia Shepherd								Amelia Shepherd		
Kelsey Scott	Karen				Rose						
Ben Shenkman	Rob Harmon							Roger Gunn			
Samantha Sloyan	Penelope "Penny" Blake	ER Nurse		Jeannine Locke							
Anna Deavere Smith								Tina Krissman			Maud
Cornelius Smith Jr.				Marcus Walker	Marcus Walker						
Stefania Spampinato	Carina DeLuca								Carina DeLuca		
Lauren Stamile	Nurse Rose			Carla Steele							
Darby Stanchfield		Tess Milford		Abby Whelan							
Cynthia Stevenson	Ruthie Carlin	Karen	Charlene	Mary Nesbitt							
Anthony Stewart Head							Lord Silvestro Capulet			Lord Sheffield	
Patrick St. Esprit				Peter Foster		Phillip Thompson					
Faran Tahir	Isaac	Charles		President Rashad	Detective Terrence Amos						
BJ Tanner	Tuck Jones								Tuck Jones		
Adria Tennor		Dr. Berman		Brenda Swan				Susan Womack			
Tessa Thompson	Camille Travis	Zoe Salter	Sydney								
Tamlyn Tomita		Katie's lawyer			Judge Carol Morrow						
Jamie Tompkins				Female corporate executive		Tammi Ingram					
Mageina Tovah		Rebecca Hobart		Molly Ackerman	Jolene Samuels						
Brett Tucker			Dr. Jonah Simpson						Fire Chief Lucas Ripley		
Jim Turner	Dr. Schacter				George Gabler						
Nia Vardalos	Karen					Leah Wells					
Tom Verica	Michael Norris			Co-executive producer	Sam Keating			Executive producer			Executive producer
Tracy Vilar	Becca McMurdo				Prosecutor Barker			Lydia Perez			
Sonya Walger				Katherine Winslow		Margot Bishop					
Kate Walsh	Addison Montgomery										
Nick Warnock	SWAT Guy #2				Attorney Trent Stockton						
Kerry Washington				Olivia Pope	Olivia Pope						
Derek Webster	Paul Anderson					Dr. Richard Watkins					
Liza Weil	Alison Clark	Andi		Amanda Tanner	Bonnie Winterbottom						
Michael Welch				Officer Newton		Teddy Seavers					
Wayne Wilderson	Bill Adams	Neil Denhom			Eastham						
Chandra Wilson	Miranda Bailey	Miranda Bailey							Miranda Bailey		
Bellamy Young	Kathy			Melody "Mellie" Grant							
José Zuñiga	Anthony Meloy		Julio	General Benicio Flores	Jorge Castillo						
