= Station 19 season 3 =

Station 19
- Season 3
- Promotional poster for the third season of Station 19
- Showrunner: Krista Vernoff
- Starring: Jaina Lee Ortiz; Jason George; Boris Kodjoe; Grey Damon; Barrett Doss; Jay Hayden; Okieriete Onaodowan; Danielle Savre; Miguel Sandoval
- No. of episodes: 16

Release
- Original network: ABC
- Original release: January 23 – May 14, 2020

Season chronology
- ← Previous; Season 2 Next → Season 4

The third season of the American television action-drama Station 19, spin off of Grey's Anatomy, began airing in the United States on the American Broadcasting Company (ABC) on January 23, 2020, and concluded on May 14, 2020. The season was produced by ABC Studios, in association with Shondaland Production Company.

This is the first season under showrunner Krista Vernoff. This is the first season without Alberto Frezza as a series regular and is also the last season to feature Miguel Sandoval as a series regular. On March 11, 2020, the series was renewed for a fourth season.

Station 19 centers around the professional and personal lives of the firefighters of the fictional Station 19 of the Seattle Fire Department. Several plot points connect to parent series Grey's Anatomy through fictional crossover events.

== Episodes ==
List of Station 19 season 3 episodes
No. overall	No. in season	Title	Directed by	Written by	Original release date	Prod. code	U.S. viewers (millions)
28	1	"I Know This Bar"	Paris Barclay	Krista Vernoff	January 23, 2020	301	7.02
After a tiring call, the Station 19 crew responds to the car crash into the Emerald City Bar. Inside, Ben and Pruitt team up with Grey Sloan's Jackson, Levi, and Nico to stabilize the injured surgical residents and the couple inside the car. The rest of the crew works from the outside to get everyone out and to the hospital. Tension lingers between Andy and Robert, who has rejected her in favor of impending promotions following Ripley's death. After taking her insubordinate behavior for weeks, he finally orders her to take personal days to stop her from inadvertently influencing the other team members. Maya breaks up with Jack for the same reason. Flashbacks detail the crew celebrating Bailey's pregnancy and being introduced to Jackson as Vic's new boyfriend as well as an explosive fight between Pruitt and his daughter as her sleeping with her Captain threatens to tarnish his legacy. Note : This episode begins a crossover event that concludes on Grey's Anatomy season 16 episode 10.
29	2	"Indoor Fireworks"	Paris Barclay	Kiley Donovan	January 30, 2020	302	6.12
Michael Dixon from the Police Department is promoted as the new Fire Chief. While visiting the best company of the city, he reveals his intent to get the department good publicity. With Andy replaced by Rigo Vasquez from B-shift, the team responds to a call of fireworks going off in a five and dime store. Ben meets a teenager there that reminds him of his younger self as flashbacks detail a joyride accident that left his friend in a permanent vegetative state, which was the reason behind his career choices. Pruitt lets Sullivan know he won't hesitate to inform Dixon of his involvement with Andy if whatever is going on does not stop immediately. Maya reveals to Sullivan she's aiming for Captain if he gets promoted to Battalion Chief while Jack sleeps with Vasquez' wife, only realizing her identity later. Meanwhile, Andy and Ryan babysit her neighbors' kids when she is taken to the hospital after an accident. As Ryan confesses he came back from San Diego because he is still in love with Andy, the young boy appears with his mother's gun and shoots Ryan.
30	3	"Eulogy"	Eric Laneuville	Anupam Nigam	February 6, 2020	303	5.92
Ryan succumbs to his injury while flashbacks detail his importance in Andy's life throughout the years. Flashbacks also reveal that Pruitt went to visit Ryan in San Diego to ask him to come back and play a role Andy's life given Pruitt's cancer and looming death, further encouraging him to confess his love for her. Andy returns to work soon after the funeral. A disastrous call pushes Ben to advocate for his Physician Response Team. Sullivan seeks out Tom Koracick's help when the pain in his leg becomes increasingly unmanageable. Jackson invites Vic for dinner with his mother, Richard and Maggie and she convinces Dean to come along as a buffer. Jack can't resist sleeping with Rigo's wife again. Pruitt convinces Sullivan not to appoint Andy to Captain as he thinks her state of mind would cause her to blow it, leading to Sullivan recommending Maya for the job.
31	4	"House Where Nobody Lives"	Oliver Bokelberg	Meghann Plunkett	February 13, 2020	304	6.00
To move on from his broken relationship, Jack hooks up with the wife of another firefighter. And now that Maya is promoted to captain, it only makes things worse. Like everyone else at Station 19, Jack knows Andy deserved the job. Maya asks the team to abide by the ambulance “patrolling” high-risk areas. Since Miller is late, Maya asks the entire team to repeat the activity. Meanwhile, Ben and Jack mollify a group of homeless foster and biological siblings so they can help save a life and this triggers memories from Jack's past. The new Fire Chief is already creating trouble. Michael Dixon was never a firefighter, he was a former cop and that puts him on a totally different tangent. Jack takes the time to talk to Andy about Ryan's death.
32	5	"Into the Woods"	Andy Wolk	Tyrone Finch	February 20, 2020	305	6.27
In an effort to increase morale, Maya takes the crew on a team-building camping trip. After a tense night, their bond is put to the test as they work to save first-time campers after a gruesome bear attack. Rigo suspects there is something going on between his wife and Jack when the two arrive late together to help them out. Pruitt and Andy mend their relationship when he offers an apology for his outburst. Sullivan and Ben stay behind from the trip to prepare an aid car for Ben's Physician Response Team. Ben vents his grief about losing his baby while Sullivan steals Fentanyl from the medical supplies. The medication causes him to open up about his personal life and behave erratically, alarming Ben, but Sullivan brushes it off as stress caused by his new job. Maya, feeling isolated and ridiculed by her former friends, flashes back to her youth, when her abusive father made her focus on her running career at the cost of a social life.
33	6	"Ice Ice Baby"	Tessa Blake	Rob Giles	February 27, 2020	306	6.59
When a blizzard hits Seattle, the station opens its doors as a shelter for people in the neighborhood, among them is J.J., who goes into labor. Unable to be transported to the hospital, Maya, Andy, and Pruitt help her deliver the baby girl in the station. Maya tries to repair her friendship with Andy. When their argument becomes heated, Maya points out Pruitt's recent hovering over Andy, which leads to Andy piecing together that his cancer is back. She breaks down and is comforted by Robert. Rigo confronts Jack about his sleeping with Eva and beats him up. Jack explains to Dean why he didn't defend himself and Dean judges him for breaking the code amongst firefighters. Ben and Sullivan take care of a man whose foot needs to be amputated, increasing Ben's suspicions of Sullivan's weird behavior. Meanwhile, Travis tries to save a woman with dementia who's snowed in inside of her car in an undisclosed location. As his worried mother checks in on his wellbeing, he thinks back to his parents struggling to accept his sexuality and his breaking off contact with them when they fail to show up for the wedding.
34	7	"Satellite of Love"	Paris Barclay	Chris Downey	March 5, 2020	307	6.00
After questioning Maya's ability to be captain Andy decides that she will just stick to the job. Montgomery picks up a guy at bar and in the morning is surprised to discover that he is Chief Dixon's son Emmett, who has been assigned to Station 19 as a rookie. Emmett is slow to get into his turn-out gear and misses the call ending up on desk duty dealing with a homeless man who sneaks in to use the station's showers. The call involves a test rocket that crashed into a gas station igniting a tanker. Gibson tries to stop Vasquez charging at the source of the fire, but he won't listen, and is severely injured when the rocket explodes and he becomes Warren's first patient. Sullivan is still trying to cover up the problem with his leg and ODs on the Fentanyl he stole from Warren's truck. He hallucinates a discussion with Ripley and Emmett finds him passed out on the floor. Warren covers up the missing vials by reporting them as broken in transit.
35	8	"Born to Run"	David Greenspan	Jill Weinberger	March 12, 2020	308	6.64
The team scrambles to save the riders after they respond to a horrific motorbike accident. Sullivan steps up and tries to seek help from Amelia Shepherd (Caterina Scorsone), whose expertise in addiction is of particular interest to him. Dean wonders how to bring up a child on his own, as JJ left. Maya is not messing around on the field and lays into the tough-boss-attitude thick. Dean comes clean to Pruitt about his inexplicable emotions regarding his new daughter, and the lack of confidence he feels about looking after her. Andy finally realizes that Sullivan is her “safe space”. Dean agrees to let Vic move in and they discuss jointly taking care of the baby, who Dean has named "Prue" (Pruitt).
36	9	"Poor Wandering One"	Janice Cooke	Brian Anthony	March 19, 2020	309	7.39
Bishop calls Sullivan and Andy into her office to tell Sullivan that she wants a demotion, thinking that Herrera deserved the promotion instead, which he says he will take under advisement. Dean and Vic adjust to caring for Baby Prue. Jack and Andy are called to an in-progress fight at a gun store, which ends up being between the owner and a troubled veteran who feels he's been robbed by the pawn process. After being disarmed of his knife, he pulls the pin out of a grenade. Flashbacks show Vic as a teen dealing with her grandmother's mental deterioration. Sullivan (ex-Marine) is called to the gun shop to help the suicidal vet, also a former jarhead. Pruitt enlists Ben to help him place dozens of pairs of boots on city hall's steps in protest of the firefighters dying of cancer while not being covered by the city's insurance, embarrassing the new chief, Dixon. Dixon's son, a new recruit and probationary firefighter, admits to Travis that he was an art major and his father pushed him into the academy.
37	10	"Something About What Happens When We Talk"	Yangzom Brauen	Krista Vernoff	March 26, 2020	310	6.90
A psychologist visits Station 19 following Rigo's death. Ben opens up about saving Rigo and finally opens up about Bailey's miscarriage and her doubts about him switching from being a doctor to a firefighter. Travis shared about his particularly troubling relationship with his father. Dean lectures Vic that she sabotaged her relationship with Jackson by not telling him that she moved in with Dean. Meanwhile, Andy hasn't been able to come clean with her emotions.
38	11	"No Days Off"	Tom Verica	Cinque Henderson	April 2, 2020	311	7.16
Ben is courting Grey Sloan doctors in order to add a trauma surgeon to his rig. Maya is on vacation with Carina DeLuca but continues to phone the station. Owen Hunt stops by the station to drop a portable ultrasound off to Ben for the mobile unit. Sullivan and Andy travel to have dinner with her father. Chief Dixon stops by the station and introduces Travis, who has been sleeping with new firefighter and Dixon's son Emmett, to Emmett's... girlfriend. Awkward! Dean and Vic are struggling with a colicky Baby Prue until Jack stops by and magically stops her crying. Sullivan stumbles upon the chef of the restaurant berating kitchen employees and threatening to call ICE on them, leading Sullivan to intercede. Teddy Altman visits Ben and loves the idea of doing surgery on wheels, but new motherhood is already too much to deal with. Sullivan compares ICE to Nazis, and says it's personal to him because his grandfather was a Nazi. He springs into action when ICE arrives. Ben entertains Jackson Avery in his surgeon cattle call, and the two of them respond to the bogus injury call that Sullivan makes to help stymie the ICE agents. Everyone's phone lights up with notifications about a 5-alarm fire.
39	12	"I'll Be Seeing You"	Daryn Okada	Anupam Nigam & Meghann Plunkett	April 9, 2020	312	7.56
A seemingly simple storage fire became an endangerment to the Station 19 crew due to a dangerous storage of propane gas bottles and poor ventilation, including Andy. Pruitt, hosting a poker game with his old firefighter comrades, leaves the game when he hears about the trouble his handpicked team is in. Arriving at the fire, he puts on the uniform one final time. Inside, Jack and Andy are separated, while Emmett and Travis have gotten lost. Sullivan rushes in rashly to find his lost team members, and specifically Andy, as flashbacks show that he's married her. Pruitt breaks through the roof to ventilate the building to save everyone running out of oxygen, sacrificing himself in the process. This allows the smoke to vent and saves those still in the building, who all exit and realize that there is a vent in the roof where one had been impossible (and Maya at the base of the ladder, crying). Twenty bells toll in honor of the fallen hero, as Andy realizes it was her father who was lost.
40	13	"Dream a Little Dream of Me"	Stacey K. Black	Rob Giles	April 16, 2020	313	6.72
After the heroic death of Pruitt, Andy and the rest of the crew mourn his death in different ways. Andy has several lucid dreams. Vic decides on finding a way to raise money for Pruitt's line-of-duty funeral, including forcing other team members to pose for a calendar, because Chief Dixon is blocking it (he considers Pruitt a civilian). Maya is subjected to a review from department brass over Pruitt's death. Jack and Dean are called to a house for a third gas leak report to find that a deaf child was trying to get help for his mother who was being abused by his new step-father. The team works to get the woman help. Warren learns from Emmett that Sullivan suffered an overdose, and Emmett comes out to the station as a gay man.
41	14	"The Ghosts That Haunt Me"	Pete Chatmon	Tyrone Finch	April 30, 2020	314	5.58
The calendars are in, Andy is back to work, and Maya's mom has shown up unexpectedly. A cute girl needs help from Dean, and she gives him her number. Maya's mom explains that she has left Maya's father, citing the abuse that Maya has accepted as normal. Station 19 trucks are called to a blaze at a bowling alley where several victims are trapped inside. Meanwhile, Ben presents Sullivan with a cup to submit a drug test specimen in. In a heated conversation, Sullivan admits to Warren that he and Herrera are now married. Warren tells him he needs to tell Chief Dixon everything about the drug use, theft, and overdose. Meanwhile Andy and Jack are trapped inside the bowling alley with seven kids, while the rest of the crew tries to bring down a wall to get to them. Flashbacks show Pruitt and Warren having drinks at a bar and talking, with Pruitt recalling a call early in his career where a drunk driver had caused a horrific accident shortly after a Seattle PD officer had let him go because he was the mayor's son. Pruitt says that that cop later cashed in the favor. Warren and Sullivan speak to the chief about Sullivan's marriage and drug abuse, but not before the chief relents about Pruitt's funeral. Dixon says he doesn't need a drug scandal, so they should pretend like nothing happened. Warren realizes during this that Dixon is the cop from Pruitt's story, and Dixon threatens Ben and Miranda with a "drug ring" scandal. Warren decides to take Dixon down. Sullivan announces to everyone that he and Herrera are married.
42	15	"Bad Guy"	DeMane Davis	Kiley Donovan	May 7, 2020	315	5.57
A woman wanders into the station covered in blood, saying she thinks she killed "him." She pulls out a knife and asks what she's supposed to do with it. Warren and Jackson Avery respond to the park where the woman says she came from and find a man unresponsive with several knife wounds. They load him up and tell Emmett to drive, but unbeknownst to the surgeons, another woman jumps into the front seat and points a gun at Emmett, telling him to drive. Maya and Carina are having a great day together until Carina brings up Maya's mom. Andy sorts through family photos and boxes full of Pruitt's things. Travis and Vic are sent on strange fire inspections connected to Chief Dixon. At the station, the bloody woman explains to the cops that she was running when someone attacked her and she fought back. The gun-toting woman demands drugs from the surgeons, threatening death for noncompliance. She gets spooked and fires the gun, grazing Avery's leg. She then gets the drugs from the cabinet, runs away, and is violently struck by a truck, dying. Sullivan goes to the review board to report Dixon. In flashbacks, Vic is a community college student struggling with her grandma's death when Pruitt and Station 19 come through for a failing fire inspection, followed by the inevitable death of her theatre director.
43	16	"Louder Than a Bomb"	Paris Barclay	Emmylou Diaz	May 14, 2020	316	5.91
Suspended after having turned himself in to the Civil Service Commission, Sullivan is admitted to Grey Sloan for his surgery. Plagued by memories of her last day with her mother and her parents fighting, Andy's attention is split between staying by her husband's side and meeting her aunt Sandra, who has agreed to meet up to talk about her mother. Andy finds comfort in talking to Meredith about her family situation. Meanwhile, the rest of the crew responds to a terrorist bomb threat at Pac-North. While her crew scrambles to defuse a bomb and save precious research, Maya finds the courage to stand up to her father when he openly belittles her in front of her peers. At the scene, Dixon is arrested for fraud and extortion. Travis dumps Emmett after realizing he is not in love with him. Maya makes amends with Jack and Carina, who takes her back. Jack spends time with his improvised family. Feeling they are getting too close to keep his true feelings hidden, Dean tells Vic to move out. As Sullivan wakes up in immense pain, Andy meets Sandra in a motel and is surprised to see her mother alive and well.

== Cast and characters ==
=== Main ===
- Jaina Lee Ortiz as Andrea "Andy" Herrera
- Jason George as Benjamin “Ben” Warren
- Boris Kodjoe as Robert Sullivan
- Grey Damon as Jack Gibson
- Barrett Doss as Victoria "Vic" Hughes
- Jay Hayden as Travis Montgomery
- Okieriete Onaodowan as Dean Miller
- Danielle Savre as Maya Bishop
- Miguel Sandoval as Pruitt Herrera

=== Recurring ===
- Chandra Wilson as Dr. Miranda Bailey
- Jesse Williams as Dr. Jackson Avery
- Alex Landi as Dr. Nico Kim
- Alberto Frezza as Ryan Tanner
- Pat Healy as Fire Chief Michael Dixon
- Rigo Sanchez as Rigo Vasquez
- Kelly Thiebaud as Eva Vasquez
- Brenda Song as JJ
- Stefania Spampinato as Dr. Carina DeLuca
- Lachlan Buchanan as Emmett Dixon
- Jayne Taini as Marsha Smith

=== Notable guests ===
- Jake Borelli as Dr. Levi Schmitt
- Jaicy Elliot as Dr. Taryn Helm
- Alex Blue Davis as Dr. Casey Parker
- Devin Way as Dr. Blake Simms
- Vivian Nixon as Dr. Hannah Brody
- Greg Germann as Dr. Tom Koracick
- Phylicia Rashad as Pilar
- Jonathan Bennett as Michael Williams
- Jeanne Sakata as Nari Montgomery
- Brett Tucker as Fire Chief Lucas Ripley
- Caterina Scorsone as Dr. Amelia Shepherd
- Tracie Thoms as Dr. Diane Lewis
- BJ Tanner as William George “Tuck” Jones
- Kevin McKidd as Dr. Owen Hunt
- Kim Raver as Dr. Teddy Altman
- Kelly McCreary as Dr. Maggie Pierce
- Colleen Foy as Inara
- Ansel Sluyter-Obidos as Marcus
- Ellen Pompeo as Dr. Meredith Grey
- Patricia de Leon as Elena Herrera
- Garrett Morris as Earl Davis

== Production ==
=== Development ===
At the end of the second season, Stacy McKee stepped down as showrunner after her overall deal with ABC Studios expired. In May 2019, the series was renewed for a third season with Krista Vernoff as showrunner to provide more seamless crossovers with Grey's Anatomy. Shonda Rhimes and Betsy Beers remained executive producers, and Paris Barclay remained executive producer and producing director. Vernoff described the season as being messier and featuring more death. Production on the season was completed before the coronavirus production shutdown. Crossover elements from the season finale needed to be edited out because four Grey's Anatomy episodes could not be filmed due to the pandemic.

=== Casting ===
The entire main cast from the second season, except for Alberto Frezza, returned for the third season. Alberto Frezza only appeared as a guest star. Jesse Williams and Stefania Spampinato reprised their Grey's Anatomy roles as Dr. Jackson Avery and Dr. Carina DeLuca as romantic interests for Vic and Maya, respectively. Chandra Wilson continued her recurring role as Dr. Miranda Bailey, and Jake Borelli appeared in a crossover event as Dr. Levi Schmitt. Pat Healy was cast as the new fire chief, and Lachlan Buchanan was cast as his son Emmett. In February 2020, it was reported that Jonathan Bennett would appear as the late husband of Travis. Phylicia Rashad would play a blizzard victim named Pilar in the same episode. Patricia de Leon appeared as Andy's mother in the season finale.

== Release ==
When the 2019–20 United States network television schedule was announced, Station 19 was held for mid-season. The third season premiered on January 23, 2020 with a crossover event, while also taking over the Thursday 8:00 PM timeslot of Grey's Anatomy, which moved to 9:00 PM. After the COVID-19 pandemic truncated production of Grey's Anatomy, Station 19 was moved to Thursdays at 9:00 PM for the remainder of the season.

== Reception ==
=== Critical Response ===
Charlie Mason of TVLine stated that the show had improved, possibly due to Krista Vernoff's takeover of the show, because the uninteresting love triangle of the previous season were now replaced with romantic storylines that were much more engrossing. Laura Hurley of CinemaBlend felt that having so many crossover characters from Grey's Anatomy was detrimental to the development of Station 19's characters and that it was more interesting when focusing on its own characters.

=== Ratings ===
The season was ABC's sixth most-watched scripted television series during the 2019–2020 television season in the 18-49 demographic. Throughout its broadcast, in same-day viewership, the season averaged a 1.05 rating (Note: In Nielsen ratings, a rating is a fraction of the total number of households with televisions compared to the number of television sets tuned into a specific program.) in the 18–49 demographic and 6.46 million viewers, up 11 and 22 percent, respectively, from the previous season. In Live+7 (Note: Live+7 data includes the number of viewers watching episodes within seven days of its original broadcast by means of DVR and streaming video on demand.) the season averaged a 1.5 rating in the 18–49 demographic and 8.5 million viewers, down 6 and up 11 percent from the second season.

Viewership and ratings per episode of Station 19 season 3
No.	Title	Air date	Timeslot (ET)	Rating (18–49)	Viewers (millions)	DVR (18–49)	DVR viewers (millions)	Total (18–49)	Total viewers (millions)
1	"I Know This Bar"	January 23, 2020	Thursday; 8:00 p.m.	1.2/7	7.02	0.7	2.78	1.9	9.80
2	"Indoor Fireworks"	January 30, 2020	Thursday; 8:00 p.m.	1.0/6	6.12	0.4	1.87	1.4	7.99
3	"Eulogy"	February 6, 2020	Thursday; 8:00 p.m.	0.9/5	5.92	0.5	1.95	1.4	7.87
4	"House Where Nobody Lives"	February 13, 2020	Thursday; 8:00 p.m.	0.9/5	6.00	0.5	2.17	1.5	8.15
5	"Into the Woods"	February 20, 2020	Thursday; 8:00 p.m.	1.0/5	6.27	0.5	2.16	1.5	8.44
6	"Ice Ice Baby"	February 27, 2020	Thursday; 8:00 p.m.	1.1/6	6.59	0.5	2.17	1.6	8.76
7	"Satellite of Love"	March 5, 2020	Thursday; 8:00 p.m.	1.0/5	6.00	0.5	1.93	1.5	7.96
8	"Born to Run"	March 12, 2020	Thursday; 8:00 p.m.	1.1/6	6.64	0.5	2.06	1.5	8.71
9	"Poor Wandering One"	March 19, 2020	Thursday; 8:00 p.m.	1.3/6	7.39	0.4	1.83	1.7	9.22
10	"Something About What Happens When We Talk"	March 26, 2020	Thursday; 8:00 p.m.	1.1/5	6.90	0.5	2.00	1.6	8.86
11	"No Days Off"	April 2, 2020	Thursday; 8:00 p.m.	1.1/5	7.16	0.5	1.82	1.6	8.99
12	"I'll Be Seeing You"	April 9, 2020	Thursday; 8:00 p.m.	1.3/6	7.56	0.5	1.84	1.8	9.40
13	"Dream a Little Dream of Me"	April 16, 2020	Thursday; 9:00 p.m.	1.2/6	6.72	0.5	1.97	1.7	8.69
14	"The Ghosts That Haunt Me"	April 30, 2020	Thursday; 9:00 p.m.	0.9/5	5.58	0.5	2.16	1.3	7.74
15	"Bad Guy"	May 7, 2020	Thursday; 9:00 p.m.	0.8/4	5.57	0.5	2.11	1.3	7.68
16	"Louder Than a Bomb"	May 14, 2020	Thursday; 9:00 p.m.	0.9/5	5.91	0.5	2.16	1.4	8.07
