= November 2020 Station 19 and Grey's Anatomy crossover event =

Fictional crossover in television franchise

- Station 19 and Grey's Anatomy crossover event
- Meredith Grey (Ellen Pompeo) and Derek Shepherd (Patrick Dempsey) in a promotional image for the event
- Original air date: November 12, 2020

Part 1: Station 19
- Episode title: "Nothing Seems the Same"
- Episode no.: Season 4 Episode 1
- Directed by: Paris Barclay
- Written by: Kiley Donovan

Episode chronology
← Previous "Louder Than a Bomb"	Next → "Wild World"

Part 2: Grey's Anatomy
- Episode title: "All Tomorrow's Parties"
- Episode no.: Season 17; Episode 1
- Directed by: Debbie Allen
- Written by: Andy Reaser; Lynee E. Litt

Episode chronology
← Previous "Put on a Happy Face"	Next → "The Center Won't Hold"
- Grey's Anatomy season 17

Part 3: Grey's Anatomy
- Episode title: "The Center Won't Hold"
- Episode no.: Season 17; Episode 2
- Directed by: Debbie Allen
- Written by: Andy Reaser; Jase Miles-Perez

Episode chronology
← Previous "All Tomorrow's Parties"	Next → "My Happy Ending"
- Grey's Anatomy season 17

Crossover chronology
- Preceded by: January 2020 Station 19 and Grey's Anatomy crossover event
- Followed by: December 2020 Station 19 and Grey's Anatomy crossover event

On November 12, 2020, the American Broadcasting Company (ABC) consecutively aired a three-part fictional crossover between Station 19 and Grey's Anatomy in a three-hour timeslot. The event began with "Nothing Seems the Same" from Station 19, followed by "All Tomorrow's Parties" and "The Center Won't Hold" from Grey's Anatomy. The crossover served as the season premieres of Station 19's fourth season and Grey's Anatomy's seventeenth season, with the latter continuing into its second episode.

The storyline follows the rescue and treatment of children involved in a car accident, spanning all three episodes. Paris Barclay directed the first part, written by Kiley Donovan, while Debbie Allen directed the Grey's Anatomy episodes. Andy Reaser co-wrote both Grey's Anatomy episodes, with Lynee E. Litt and Jase Miles-Perez contributing to the writing.

Although the event is fictionally set in Seattle, Washington, filming occurred in Los Angeles, California. It also marked the surprise return of Patrick Dempsey as Derek Shepherd to Grey's Anatomy, reprising his role after his last appearance in 2015.

Upon its initial broadcast, "Nothing Seems the Same" from Station 19 was watched by 6.59 million viewers in the United States. It was followed by Grey's Anatomy's "All Tomorrow's Parties" and "The Center Won't Hold," which were watched by 5.92 million viewers. The crossover event received mixed reviews from critics, with praise for its unified storyline and Dempsey's surprise return, but criticism for its writing and execution.

== Plot ==
=== Part 1: "Nothing Seems the Same" ===
Station 19 tackles the effects of COVID-19 while the aid car responds to a car accident involving children returning from a party. As the car catches fire, it spreads into a small forest fire. Robert Sullivan (Boris Kodjoe) struggles to adjust after being fired from the Seattle Fire Department, while Andy Herrera (Jaina Lee Ortiz) processes the revelation that her mother is alive and grieves her father's death.

=== Part 2: "All Tomorrow's Parties" ===
The episode opens with a voice-over narration from Meredith Grey (Ellen Pompeo) reflecting on how disasters reveal our true selves, showing that preparation can only go so far when facing a crisis.

At Grey-Sloan Memorial in April 2020, the hospital is deeply impacted by the COVID-19 pandemic. Richard Webber (James Pickens Jr.) returns and adjusts to new safety protocols, helping Miranda Bailey (Chandra Wilson) implement a UV light to disinfect PPE. Meredith struggles emotionally as she watches patients die alone, while Owen Hunt (Kevin McKidd) and Jackson Avery (Jesse Williams) treat teenagers brought in from a wildfire. Jo Wilson (Camilla Luddington) tries to move on from Alex Karev (Justin Chambers) but realizes she isn't ready. Teddy Altman (Kim Raver) faces lingering tension with Owen, and Andrew DeLuca (Giacomo Gianniotti) returns to Grey-Sloan after an intervention to help a frustrated Meredith. Maggie Pierce (Kelly McCreary) navigates her long-distance relationship with Winston Ndugu (Anthony Hill), while Levi Schmitt (Jake Borelli) confides in Nico Kim (Alex Landi) about the toll of the pandemic. A fight between parents of the injured teens injures Bailey.

=== Part 3: "The Center Won't Hold" ===
The episode opens with a voice-over narration from Meredith Grey (Ellen Pompeo) highlighting the role of stitches in surgery, noting that while precision is crucial, true healing relies on the body's natural processes.

At the hospital, the parents of the children injured in the accident are treated, and Bailey deals with her injuries. Catherine Avery (Debbie Allen) navigates financial challenges caused by the pandemic, and Tom Koracick (Greg Germann) is demoted after mistakenly ordering the wrong PPE. He later tests positive for COVID-19. Richard and Catherine rekindle their relationship, while Teddy tries to reconcile with Owen, who remains distant. Meredith collapses in the parking garage and, in a hallucination, sees her late husband, Derek Shepherd (Patrick Dempsey), on a beach.

== Production ==
Filming for Station 19 began in the first week of September 2020, while production on Grey's Anatomy resumed on September 8, 2020, following a shortened previous season due to the COVID-19 pandemic. Cast and crew from both shows were required to wear personal protective equipment on set and undergo regular COVID testing.

All three episodes in the crossover heavily incorporated real-world events, particularly the COVID-19 pandemic. The third episode of the crossover featured the surprising and unpublicized return of former series regular Patrick Dempsey as Derek Shepherd, who last appeared in the Season 11 episode "How to Save a Life". The idea to bring Dempsey back was attributed to series star Ellen Pompeo (Meredith Grey). Krista Vernoff, the Grey's Anatomy showrunner, revealed the difficulties of keeping Dempsey's return a secret:

I have to say that it was an epic feat, the keeping of this secret. I didn't send cuts to the studio and network that included that last scene. I didn't have writers' assistants in the writers' room for the last couple of months. There were writers who didn't know we were doing this on that staff. Most of the actors didn't know we were doing this. The crew didn't know we were doing this when they showed up on the day. I put the name "Ellis Grey" in the script that we read at the table, and I had Meredith say "Mom" at the table, so we got there on the day, and no one had been told what was happening.

Dempsey shared that he enjoyed filming the reunion scene and is expected to return for future episodes. Former head makeup designer Norman T. Leavitt also returned to work on the scene. On September 17, 2020, it was announced that both Station 19 and Grey's Anatomy would premiere on November 12 in a two-part crossover event.

== Cast and characters ==
=== Main ===
Actor	Character	Episode		
Actor	Character	Station 19	Grey's Anatomy (episode 1)	Grey's Anatomy (episode 2)
Jaina Lee Ortiz	Andy Herrera	Main		
Jason George	Ben Warren	Main	Guest	
Boris Kodjoe	Robert Sullivan	Main		
Grey Damon	Jack Gibson	Main	Guest	
Barrett Doss	Victoria Hughes	Main	Guest	
Jay Hayden	Travis Montgomery	Main	Guest	
Okieriete Onaodowan	Dean Miller	Main	Guest	
Danielle Savre	Maya Bishop	Main	Guest	
Stefania Spampinato	Carina DeLuca	Main	Guest	
Ellen Pompeo	Meredith Grey		Main	Main
Chandra Wilson	Miranda Bailey	Guest	Main	Main
James Pickens Jr.	Richard Webber		Main	Main
Kevin McKidd	Owen Hunt	Guest	Main	Main
Kim Raver	Teddy Altman		Main	Main
Jesse Williams	Jackson Avery		Main	Main
Camilla Luddington	Jo Karev		Main	Main
Caterina Scorsone	Amelia Shepherd		Main	Main
Kelly McCreary	Maggie Pierce		Main	Main
Giacomo Gianniotti	Andrew DeLuca		Main	Main
Chris Carmack	Atticus "Link" Lincoln		Main	Main
Jake Borelli	Levi Schmitt		Main	Main
Greg Germann	Tom Koracick		Main	Main
Richard Flood	Cormac Hayes		Main	Main
Anthony Hill	Winston Ndugu		Main	Main

=== Notable guests ===
Actor	Character	Episode		
Actor	Character	Station 19	Grey's Anatomy (episode 1)	Grey's Anatomy (episode 2)
Noah Alexander Gerry	Joey	Guest		
Justin Ellings	Frankie Morris	Guest		Guest
BJ Tanner	Tuck Jones	Guest	Guest	
V. Vieux	Rosalind	Guest	Guest	
Jaicy Elliot	Taryn Helm		Guest	
Zaiver Sinnett	Zander Perez		Guest	Guest
Louis Ozawa	Steve Lee		Guest	Guest
Linda Park	Deborah Lee		Guest	Guest
TJ Thyne	Aaron Morris		Guest	Guest
Debbie Allen	Catherine Fox			Guest
Alex Landi	Nico Kim			Guest
Patrick Dempsey	Derek Shepherd			Guest

== Release ==
"Nothing Seems the Same" of Station 19 was originally broadcast live on November 12, 2020, in the United States on the American Broadcasting Company (ABC), and was watched by 6.59 million viewers. This was followed by "All Tomorrow's Parties" and "The Center Won't Hold" of Grey's Anatomy, which aired in the following two-hour timeslot, and were watched live by 5.92 million viewers.

== Reception ==
The crossover event received mixed reviews from critics, with praise directed towards its unified storyline and the surprise return of Patrick Dempsey (Derek Shepherd), but criticism was directed towards its writing and execution.

Jessica Lerner from TV Fanatic reviewed the first part of the crossover, stating the episode "was mostly positive" but criticized the main storyline, noting that "while it was clear the show was trying to send the message that we should be adhering to social distancing guidelines and wearing masks, it felt heavy-handed" and "more like a public service announcement," detracting from the episode's flow. Jasmine Blu, also from TV Fanatic, reviewed the second and third parts, expressing that the multiple storylines created "a mishmash of confusion and too much crammed into the premiere," but praised the ending for delivering "the shock of a lifetime with a fallen Meredith Grey (Ellen Pompeo) and a Derek sighting!"

Lincee Ray from Entertainment Weekly highlighted the packed content, remarking that "the amount of content the Grey's Anatomy showrunners stuffed into two hours proves that they made good use of their time during lockdown." Maggie Fremont from Vulture noted that the crossover "pretty much caught us up, even if very quickly, on where every character's drama from last season stands."
