= Stefania Spampinato =

Italian actress

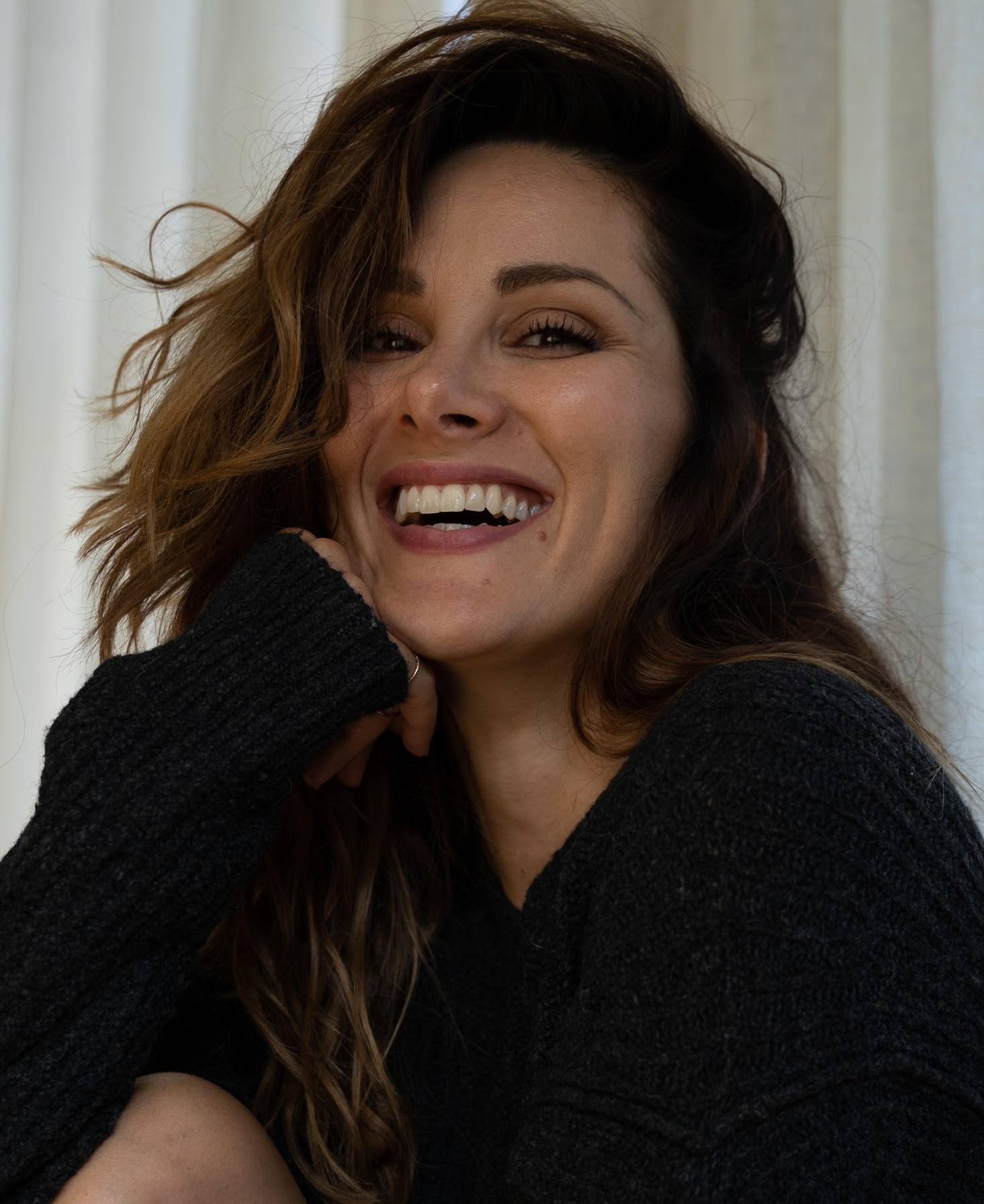
- Born: 17 July 1982 (age 44); Catania, Sicily, Italy
- Occupations: Actress, dancer, model
- Years active: 2002–present
- Spouse: Tony Testa (m. 2018; div. 2020)

Stefania Spampinato (born 17 July 1982) is an Italian actress. She is best known for starring in the ABC's series Grey's Anatomy and its spinoff Station 19 as Carina DeLuca.

== Life and career ==
Born in Catania, Sicily, Stefania Spampinato began studying dance at the age of six. After graduating with full marks from the Liceo Classico Mario Cutelli in Catania, she moved to Milan to study dance, acting and singing, where she also graduated from the Academy of Arts. In 2006, she moved to London, where her work as a dancer enabled her to travel the world. In 2011, Spampinato moved to Los Angeles, where she continued to study acting.

After taking part in TV series such as Glee and Satisfaction, Spampinato joined the cast of Grey's Anatomy in 2017 as Carina DeLuca, sister of Andrew DeLuca and wife of Maya Bishop. From 2020 to 2024, she continued to play the same role in the TV series Station 19, the second spin-off from Grey's Anatomy.

In 2019, she was chosen as the co-star of the comedy The Most Beautiful Day in the World, interpreted and directed by Alessandro Siani.

== Personal life ==
Spampinato married choreographer Tony Testa in 2018. Their divorce was finalized in 2020.

== Filmography ==
=== Film ===
Year	Title	Role	Notes
2014	Kilo Valley	Natalia	Short film
2014	A Date With Felipe	Elena	Short film
2014	Off the Grid	Sasha	
2014	The Real Truth Behind The Real True Story: Donnie Miller	Total Body Charade Conditioning Dancer	Short film
2014	The Very Scientific System	Carolina	Short film
2015	How to Have Sex on a Plane	Flight Attendant	Short film
2015	The Good, the Bad, and the Dead	Sarah Barns	
2015	Boiling Point: Risotto	Alex	Short film
2015	Boiling Point: Skewers	Sam	Short film
2015	Her Ring	Stella Foster	Short film
2017	The Gods	Sofia Fasano	Short film
2019	Ford v Ferrari	Ferrari's English Translator	
2019	The Most Beautiful Day in the World	Flavia Mainardi	
2019	Spies in Disguise	Agency Employee #10 / Italian Woman	Voice
2020	Darkness Falls	Amanda Tyler	

=== Television ===
Year	Title	Role	Notes
2006	Richard & Judy	Italian Girl	1 episode
2007	The Odd Couple	Nicoletta	Episode: "Paura di volare"
2013	Promo Life	Ruba	TV film
2014	Glee	Dancer	Episode: "Frenemies"
2014	Anonymous	Sasha Espinosa	8 episodes
2015	Less is More	Nancy	TV mini series
2015	Satisfaction	Paola	Episodes: "Through Expansion", "Through Risk"
2015	Chasing Skirts	Speed Dater #1	TV mini series
2016	Mère et Fille, California Dream	Publicist	TV movie
2017	Mr & Mrs Smit	Mrs. Smit	Episode: "Pilot"
2017–2024	Grey's Anatomy	Dr. Carina DeLuca-Bishop	Recurring role (season 14-20); 44 episodes
2018	The Chosen Ones	Mary	Episode: "Pilot"
2020–2024	Station 19	Dr. Carina DeLuca-Bishop	Recurring role (season 3), Series regular (seasons 4-7); 64 episodes
2025	Landman	Bella Morrell	Season 2, Episodes 3, 4, 9, & 10
