= 8 Simple Rules season 1 =

8 Simple Rules
- Season 1
- Region 1 DVD cover
- No. of episodes: 28

Release
- Original network: ABC
- Original release: September 17, 2002 – May 20, 2003

The first season of 8 Simple Rules aired on ABC between September 17, 2002, and May 20, 2003, and consists of 28 episodes. Known on broadcast as 8 Simple Rules... for Dating My Teenage Daughter Season One, On August 7, 2007, Walt Disney Studios Home Entertainment released the complete first season on DVD on a 3-disc set as 8 Simple Rules, the shortened title the series was renamed on its third season due to the death of John Ritter.

Guest stars throughout season one include: Cybill Shepherd, Jason Priestley, Terry Bradshaw, Nick Carter, Shelley Long, Patrick Warburton, Thad Luckinbill, Billy Aaron Brown and Larry Miller.

== Cast and characters ==
=== Main cast ===
- John Ritter as Paul Hennessey
- Katey Sagal as Cate Hennessey
- Kaley Cuoco as Bridget Hennessey
- Amy Davidson as Kerry Hennessey
- Martin Spanjers as Rory Hennessey

=== Guest cast ===
- Billy Aaron Brown as Kyle
- Larry Miller as Tommy
- Patrick Warburton as Nick Sharpe
- Nikki Danielle Moore as Jenna Sharpe
- Nicole Mansour as Rachel Sharpe
- Cole Williams as Anthony
- Brian Sites as Jason
- Shelley Long as Mary Ellen Doyle
- John Ratzenberger as Fred Doyle
- Thad Luckinbill as Donny Doyle
- Terry Bradshaw as Steve "Canned Heat" Smith
- Matt Funke as Travis "The Rainman" Smith
- Jason Priestley as Carter Tibbits
- Nick Carter as Ben
- Cybill Shepherd as Maggie
- Don Knotts as himself
- Steven Gilborn as Clerk

== Episodes ==
| No. overall | No. in season | Title | Directed by | Written by | Original release date | Prod. code | U.S. viewers (millions) |
|---|---|---|---|---|---|---|---|
| 1 | 1 | "Pilot" | Gil Junger | Tracy Gamble | September 17, 2002 | R-130 | 17.29 |
Cate decides to go back to work as a nurse and Paul has to contend with his eldest daughter, Bridget, dating Kyle, the son of his co-worker Tommy. Paul and Cate are shocked to learn later on that Kerry, their other daughter, has been suspended from school for skipping class because she has previously been a perfect student.
| 2 | 2 | "Wall of Shame" | James Widdoes | Story by : W. Bruce Cameron; Teleplay by : Mike Langworthy | September 24, 2002 | R-133 | 12.83 |
Paul is eager to watch the big football game of Michigan vs. Ohio State (it's Michigan fans Easter holiday according to him). Cate leaves for the day for a nursing seminar because she's interested in possibly getting her Master's degree, leaving Paul in charge of the kids. Bridget is accused of shoplifting and Paul refuses to believe her when she says she's innocent. He later listens to her story and believes her. Kerry is upset after seeing a circus ad in the paper because it's animal cruelty to her. Because of Bridget and Kerry's interruptions, Paul ends up missing almost the entire game.
| 3 | 3 | "Bridget's First Job" | James Widdoes | Bill Daly | October 1, 2002 | R-134 | 13.41 |
After seeing how much money Bridget spends on keeping up with the latest fashions, Paul and Cate decide it's time for her to get a job to learn the value of a dollar. Bridget gets a job in the mall at a store called Strip Rags and her parents are very impressed at how well she is managing it. But when Bridget gets her first paycheck, she finds out she has spent 400 dollars more than she earned. In a hurry to pay it back, she uses her emergency credit card. Paul and Cate find out after Cate can't buy gas because of the 500 dollar charge on the credit. Bridget explains her situation and Paul expresses his disappointment in her, but says that nonetheless, he's proud of her for owning up to what she did. Paul and Cate say that Bridget can pay them back for the credit card at a slow pace.
| 4 | 4 | "Wings" | James Widdoes | Story by : W. Bruce Cameron; Teleplay by : Bill Daly & Bonnie Kallman | October 8, 2002 | R-135 | 14.97 |
Bridget wants desperately to take her driver's test, but Paul keeps making excuses as to why she can't. Kerry decides to enter an art contest, but is devastated when she's rejected. Paul goes to find out why and one of the judges says that while Kerry is very talented, her artwork was not suitable for the contest. Cate later on takes Bridget to her driving test, to which Paul reluctantly agrees. Bridget comes back home, a newly licensed Michigan driver. As she and Kerry leave to go to the store, Paul watches them from the garage and gives a little wave, saying "Off you go". (That part was included as the last clip in a montage of John Ritter at the end of his last episode.)
| 5 | 5 | "Son-in-Law" | James Widdoes | Story by : W. Bruce Cameron; Teleplay by : Tracy Gamble & Martin Weiss | October 15, 2002 | R-132 | 13.07 |
A sports-struck Paul lets Bridget do whatever she wants when she breaks up with Kyle and begins dating high school basketball wonder Travis "The Rainman" Smith, whose father just happens to be Michigan baseball legend Steve "Canned Heat" Smith. Meanwhile Kerry resents the fact that Paul still thinks of her as a little girl and not as a budding teenager ready to take on the dating world.
| 6 | 6 | "Cheerleader" | James Widdoes | Story by : W. Bruce Cameron; Teleplay by : Paul Ciancarelli & David DiPietro | October 22, 2002 | R-131 | 14.16 |
Bridget is ecstatic when the cheerleading squad has an opening for a new member. But after telling Kerry that she is not cut out to be a cheerleader, Bridget is completely dumbfounded when her sister tries out and is chosen for the team. Meanwhile, Paul tries in vain to wean Rory off video games and introduce him to the world of books.
| 7 | 7 | "Trick or Treehouse" | James Widdoes | Story by : W. Bruce Cameron; Teleplay by : Bonnie Kallman | October 29, 2002 | R-136 | 13.49 |
Paul seems to be the only one looking forward to a family Halloween, as Bridget, Kerry and Rory make plans to spend the spooky evening away from home and with their friends. But Paul's wish to relive the past by having the family get together for one last Halloween campout in the old treehouse may turn out to be the biggest nightmare of the evening.
| 8 | 8 | "By the Book" | James Widdoes | Paul Ciancarelli & David DiPietro | November 5, 2002 | R-137 | 12.75 |
In an effort to win back the love and respect that his daughters used to show him when they were young, Paul turns to a parenting book for some quick advice. But when Bridget and Kerry discover Paul's teaching tool, they try to use it to their advantage to get their father to let them go to a rock festival. At the same time Bridget and Kerry find it amusing to convince Rory that he's adopted while taking more advantage of their parents.
| 9 | 9 | "Two Boys for Every Girl" | James Widdoes | Bill Callahan & Philip Wen | November 12, 2002 | R-138 | 12.83 |
Paul's plan backfires when, after telling Bridget to tell Kyle the truth about her date with another boy, Kyle breaks up with her. Meanwhile, Kerry's first date turns out to be a dream, but she is devastated when the boy doesn't call her back. Paul sees how miserable both his daughters are, and plays the role of matchmaker.
| 10 | 10 | "Give It Up" | James Widdoes | Martin Weiss | November 19, 2002 | R-139 | 12.68 |
It's time for summer vacation, but the Hennessys can't decide where to go. Paul wants to go to their regular cabin at the lake, Rory's idea is Space Camp, Bridget wants to go to Mall of America, Cate wishes to visit her parents' condo while Kerry just wants to stay home. To settle the issue, Paul initiates a contest. Each family member must give up a bad habit, and the last person standing gets to pick the vacation. Rory, who gives up tattling, is the first to go, then Cate (coffee), and Bridget (telephone), leaving it down to just Paul (the television remote) and Kerry (sarcasm). To try to get her to break, Paul treats Kerry to dinner at a 50s-style diner, but during the meal he begins to worry that his daughter's constant sarcasm is hiding a deeper sadness.
| 11 | 11 | "Paul Meets His Match" | James Widdoes | Story by : Dena Waxman; Teleplay by : Bonnie Kallman & Martin Weiss | November 26, 2002 | R-141 | 12.60 |
Paul has no idea about how badly he has been treating Bridget and Kerry's boyfriends, until he sees his seemingly friendly new boss, Nick Sharpe, treat Rory in the same manner. Paul found out that Nick has the same situation as he has. This causes Paul to take a change of heart and give his daughters' boyfriends a chance.
| 12 | 12 | "All I Want For Christmas" | James Widdoes | Christy Jacobs White | December 10, 2002 | R-142 | 12.87 |
It's Christmas time, and Paul hopes to make this Christmas the best Christmas yet. When Paul asks what everyone would like, Rory says he wants a motorcycle, Bridget wants Kyle to spend the holiday with her, and Kerry wants to keep a stray dog she found. When Paul says that Kerry can't keep the dog, she is upset (as usual). Later, Paul writes a column encouraging people to adopt pets, which makes her feel better. Meanwhile, Cate gets the solo part at the Christmas Eve service, and she is nervous that her family will be there. On Christmas Eve, the family helps Kerry with the Pet Adoption Fair at the mall, where every dog, except the one she found, is given a home. Afterwards, they all go to the Christmas Eve service, where they hear Cate sing her solo of "Silent Night" When they get home, she says she is glad they came after all. Paul agrees to let the kids each open a present that night. Rory gets a chemistry set, much to Cate's chagrin, Bridget gets the company of Kyle, and Kerry gets to keep the dog she found. (However, the dog is never seen again on the show.) The episode ends with Kaley Cuoco and Amy Davidson doing a promo for the Humane Society of the United States.
| 13 | 13 | "Rory's Got a Girlfriend" | James Widdoes | Bill Daly | December 17, 2002 | R-140 | 11.54 |
Rory has a girlfriend named Sabrina Jenkins, and he asks Paul if he can take her on a group date to the movies. Paul allows Rory to go, which outrages Bridget and Kerry because Rory is much younger than they were. Meanwhile, Kerry is upset when Bridget receives a higher test score than her. This leads everyone to think that Bridget is smarter than Kerry. But later on, Kerry receives a letter stating that there was a mistake in the scores and that she actually had the higher score. Not wanting to make Bridget upset, Cate tells Bridget that she got a magazine in the mail.
| 14 | 14 | "Career Choices" | Terry Hughes | Amy Engelberg & Wendy Engelberg | January 7, 2003 | R-143 | 12.34 |
Paul and Cate are shocked when they are called into the principal's office and informed that Bridget wants to skip her college prep classes in order to become an esthetician. Meanwhile, Paul is so impressed with Kerry's sketches of "The Incredible Boring Woman" that he gets the principal to print them in the school newspaper — not realizing that the principal is the "boring woman" in question. Kerry is upset because, as her punishment, she must make banners for the pep squad, but she tells Paul she does think it was kind of cool to have her artwork published.
| 15 | 15 | "Kerry's Big Adventure" | James Widdoes | Tracy Gamble & Martin Weiss | January 21, 2003 | R-145 | 11.29 |
After Kerry and her boyfriend break up, Paul tries to cheer up his blue daughter by getting Bridget to take her little sister with her to a party. But while talking to Kyle at the party, Kerry is shocked when a spark is ignited and the two share a romantic kiss. Paul and Cate try to discover what is hidden in Rory's secret box. They find Paul's sports articles, but Rory really has fireworks.
| 16 | 16 | "Come and Knock on Our Door" | James Widdoes | Bill Callahan & Philip Wen | January 28, 2003 | R-146 | 11.38 |
After finding out that she kissed Kyle, Bridget gives Kerry the silent treatment, which is anything but quiet for Paul. That night, Paul has a dream on the set of Three's Company (in which John Ritter rose to fame), which parodies the show right down to the last detail. In the dream, Kyle (Jack) pretends to be gay in order to fool Paul (Mr. Roper), so he can have Bridget (Chrissy) and Kerry (Janet). They are soon joined by Cate (Mrs. Roper) and Rory (Larry). Back in real life, Bridget goes to Kyle's new apartment to break up with him. (Not surprisingly, this was John Ritter's favorite episode of the first season.) In the end Don Knotts appears as himself in a dream sequence with Paul.
| 17 | 17 | "Drummer Boy (Part 1)" | James Widdoes | Bill Daly | February 4, 2003 | R-147 | 11.54 |
After Bridget is caught sneaking out of the house, she tells Paul and Cate that she has a dream of playing in an all-female band. Paul suggests she take up an instrument. Bridget chooses to take up drums. Paul hires her a drum instructor, named Ben (Nick Carter), who Bridget becomes infatuated with, but is much older than she is. Meanwhile, Kerry is upset with her ex-boyfriend, Jason, when he calls Cate pretty and feels she has to compete with against her mother and sister for attention.
| 18 | 18 | "Drummer Boy (Part 2)" | James Widdoes | Janis Hirsch | February 11, 2003 | R-148 | 10.66 |
When Bridget learns that Ben is leaving to go back to his college in Ohio, Bridget decides to follow him. To cover, she says she is going to a sleepover. Kerry invites herself along in hopes of foiling Bridget's plan, but Bridget ends up going to Ohio State University (where Ben goes to college) anyway. Later, Paul and Cate find out and go after them. Rory is reading To Kill a Mockingbird, and wants to find the part where the mockingbird is actually killed (not realizing that there isn't one at all).
| 19 | 19 | "Cool Parent" | James Widdoes | Paul Ciancarelli & David DiPietro | February 18, 2003 | R-149 | 10.66 |
After a party at Tommy's house is busted by the police, Paul takes the matter into his own hands by volunteering his house for the post-basketball finals party. During the party, Paul falls asleep, and the party gets out of control, as Paul finds all the kids sleeping the next morning. This causes him to lose popularity with the kids' parents, but the kids now find him cool. While Cate is at work the next evening, Kerry and Bridget allow some friends to come over, and it eventually turns into a party, but Bridget and Kerry call it a kid-pack, as it is less than 20 kids. Eventually, Cate comes home and convinces Paul to stop the party/kid-pack, which he does, which causes him to lose all popularity with the kids, and he returns to being the dorky parent the kids found him to be. Meanwhile, when Paul tries to help Rory stick up to some bullies at school (though all they'd done was call him one name) at the beginning of the episode, it turns out that he was wearing slippers. He is then on referred to as "Slipper Dad". Rory is also humiliated by this. At the end of the episode, Rory dumps a whole box of slippers on Paul.
| 20 | 20 | "Every Picture Tells a Story" | Mark Cendrowski | David Flebotte | February 25, 2003 | R-151 | 9.98 |
Rory comes home with exciting news to tell Cate: the racecar driver Carter Tibbits has asked Paul to write a book about him. Carter has also invited the Hennessys over to his mansion for dinner. While there, Paul makes a joke to the kids: "$20 to whoever steals the best thing!" Paul seems to make a good impression on Carter, and it looks like Paul will get to write the book. But when they get home, they discover Rory took Paul's joke too far. It turns out that Rory stole a picture of Carter and Paul Newman. Paul sneaks to the mansion and returns the picture. Later, Carter's crew chief Cody Grant arrives at the house and tells Paul that Carter has turned down Paul's services. Paul was caught on a security camera when he was returning the picture, and he goes to Carter to straighten out the situation. While there, Rory confesses to having stolen the picture, and Paul was returning it. Carter sees something in Rory that he looks for in all the students in a program for at-risk kids that he runs: character. Carter asks Rory if there was anything he could get for him. It appears that Rory is going to ask Carter to reconsider having Paul write the book, but he ends up asking for the security camera tape with Paul on it (which annoys Paul to an extent). Meanwhile, Bridget has been constantly psycho-analyzing Kerry, which annoys her. So she gets back by telling Bridget that she has a disorder called narcissism.
| 21 | 21 | "Kerry's Video" | Terry Hughes | Bonnie Kallman | March 11, 2003 | R-144 | 9.93 |
Kerry devotes her school video project to Bridget to illustrate the hypocrisy that life is much easier for the beautiful people. But when Bridget discovers that the video makes her look shallow, she takes Paul's advice to enrich her life by taking up tennis again, and ends up with a broken nose. Bob and Mike Bryan, the No. 3-ranked tennis team in the world, make a cameo appearance on the tennis court.
| 22 | 22 | "Good Moms Gone Wild" | James Widdoes | Bill Callahan & Philip Wen | March 25, 2003 | R-153 | 10.26 |
While vacationing in Florida at Cate's parents' home, Paul and Cate catch Bridget and Kerry on the evening news partying with a group of Spring Breakers. But before a punishment can be implemented, the news runs archival footage that features a young, wild Cate letting loose in a bar, leading the girls to believe Cate is hypocritical. Meanwhile, a jealous Paul meets Byron, the man that Cate went out with during her college sophomore year, and Rory befriends Jake Fisher, an elderly gentleman whose stories about World War II turn out to be more fiction than fact.
| 23 | 23 | "Career Woman" | Mark Cendrowski | Rosalind Moore | March 28, 2003 | R-152 | 7.91 |
When Cate is offered a promotion at the hospital, Bridget is upset, as she depends on Cate to help her with her family tree project for school, while Kerry encourages her mom. However, when Cate is offered the promotion, she declines it, as it is too much stress on the family. It is revealed that Bridget wasn't really upset; she was just fooling Paul, and Kerry was trying to cover up the fact that she missed Cate. Meanwhile, Paul tries to introduce Rory to the world of baseball cards to take his mind off his monkey obsession. However, Rory manages to trade the cards for a monkey, which he names Kirk Gibson (possibly to fool Paul). The monkey remains hidden until the end of the episode, when everyone comes home and sees the mess the monkey made.
| 24 | 24 | "Queen Bees and King Bees" | James Widdoes | Martin Weiss | April 8, 2003 | R-154 | 8.38 |
Bridget and Paul are surprised to find themselves in similar situations when they are both alienated in their social circles. But they devise a plan to settle the score, leading Paul to crash a poker game with co-worker Tommy to get closer to boss Nick Sharpe, and Bridget trying to break up ex-boyfriend Kyle and her nemesis, Jenna.
| 25 | 25 | "Bake Sale" | James Widdoes | Kim Friese | April 29, 2003 | R-155 | 8.23 |
Bridget begrudgingly becomes a mother when she is assigned to take care of a baby made out of a sack full of flour for school. When Kerry and Rory bake cookies for the Great American Bake Sale to help put an end to childhood hunger in America, Bridget begins to notice that her baby is mysteriously losing weight.
| 26 | 26 | "The Doyle Wedding" | Lynn McCracken | Rosalind Moore | May 6, 2003 | R-158 | 7.63 |
Much to the family's dismay, Cate invites the Doyles over for dinner, which turns out to be a stressful evening for all. Later, the Doyles invite the Hennessys to a wedding for their daughter. As the family always follows through on prior commitments, Paul tries hard to find an excuse not to go to the wedding. Then Paul discovers that the play that Rory is in (in which he cross-dresses.) is on the same day as the Doyles' wedding. But when Paul gets ready to tell them they can't make it, the Doyles tell them that the Hennessys are like family to them. Paul changes his mind, and they go to the wedding, with Bridget and Kerry as the bridesmaids (they don't like the dresses, though), and Rory as the ring bearer. Meanwhile, Bridget has been avoiding Donny because she thinks he's dorky, but she ends up dancing with him at the wedding reception because she thinks he's now handsome.
| 27 | 27 | "Sort of an Officer and a Gentleman (Part 1)" | James Widdoes | Heather MacGillvray & Linda Mathious | May 13, 2003 | R-156 | 7.45 |
Cate learns that her sister Maggie is having marital problems. Paul thinks the family can help her, so he invites her to stay at the house, much to Cate's dismay, as the two sisters have a history of sibling rivalry. Meanwhile, Bridget has become more mature after Paul and Cate let her go out with Donny, who is home from the Naval Academy. Bridget and Kerry believe that Kyle has ulterior motives when he befriends Rory.
| 28 | 28 | "Sort of an Officer and a Gentleman (Part 2)" | James Widdoes | Janis Hirsch & Bonnie Kallman | May 20, 2003 | R-157 | 7.88 |
The sibling rivalry between Cate and Maggie comes to a boiling point when Maggie gets a sexy new makeover and gives Bridget a water bra as a gift. Meanwhile tensions between the Hennessy sisters mount when Kerry and Kyle begin dating, while Bridget's popularity takes a nosedive after she dissed her friends for Donny, and Paul becomes concerned when he finds an empty pregnancy test kit, which turns out to be Cate's.

== DVD release ==
The Complete First Season
| Set Details | | | Special Features |
| 28 episodes; 3-disc set; 1.78:1 aspect ratio; Languages: English Dolby Digital 5.1; French Dolby Digital 2.0; English, French & Spanish Subtitles | | | Blooper Reel; Trailers |
| Release Dates | | | Blooper Reel; Trailers |
| Region 1 | Region 2 | Region 4 | Blooper Reel; Trailers |
| 7 August 2007 | 1 September 2008 | 12 November 2008 | Blooper Reel; Trailers |
