= Trick or Treehouse =

Trick or Treehouse can refer to:

== Television ==
- "Trick or Treehouse (8 Simple Rules)", an episode of 8 Simple Rules
- "Trick or Treehouse (Dexter's Laboratory)", an episode of Dexter's Laboratory
