= Who's Your Daddy (Friday Night Lights) =

- Friday Night Lights episode
- Episode no.: Season 1 Episode 4
- Directed by: Allison Liddi-Brown
- Written by: Kerry Ehrin
- Cinematography by: David Boyd
- Editing by: Scott Gamzon
- Original release date: October 24, 2006
- Running time: 43 minutes

Guest appearances
- Aldis Hodge as Ray "Voodoo" Tatum; Kevin Rankin as Herc; Walter Perez as Bobby "Bull" Reyes

Episode chronology
← Previous "Wind Sprints"	Next → "Git'er Done"
- Friday Night Lights (season 1)

"Who's Your Daddy" is the fourth episode of the first season of the American sports drama television series Friday Night Lights, inspired by the 1990 nonfiction book by H. G. Bissinger. The episode was written by consulting producer Kerry Ehrin and directed by Allison Liddi-Brown. It originally aired on NBC on October 24, 2006.

The series is set in the fictional town of Dillon, a small, close-knit community in rural West Texas. It follows a high school football team, the Dillon Panthers. It features a set of characters, primarily connected to Coach Eric Taylor, his wife Tami, and their daughter Julie. In the episode, Voodoo starts training for the Panthers, and Matt fears his spot is challenged. Meanwhile, Jason moves into the rehabilitation facility and meets his roommate.

According to Nielsen Media Research, the episode was seen by an estimated 6.27 million household viewers and gained a 2.2 ratings share among adults aged 18–49. The episode received positive reviews from critics, who praised the performances and character development. Critics, however, expressed frustration towards the character of Voodoo, with many criticizing his behavior.

== Plot ==
During a Panthers party hosted by Matt (Zach Gilford), Voodoo (Aldis Hodge) gets into a conflict with Smash (Gaius Charles) when he changes the party's music. Smash threatens with violence, but Voodoo simply walks away. During this, people vandalize the Panthers' field house.

Eric (Kyle Chandler) deduces that their longtime rivals, Arnett Meade, was responsible for the damage, but warns the team not to seek retaliation. Even though Voodoo arrives late to practice and the team does not like him, he excels athletically, impressing Eric and Buddy (Brad Leland). Matt struggles during practice. That night, Matt finds that Lorraine (Louanne Stephens) has wandered into a neighbor's house, leading to her arrest. Lyla (Minka Kelly) tells Tim (Taylor Kitsch) that their kiss was a mistake and asks to move forward with their respective lives, which Tim agrees.

Jason (Scott Porter) starts physical therapy at the rehabilitation facility, but he is resistant to treatment and is annoyed by his roommate, an athlete in a wheelchair named Herc (Kevin Rankin). At a party hosted by the Taylors, a brick is thrown through the window with the words "Die Panther Pigs". Matt joins Tim, Smash and other players in vandalizing a car belonging to Arnett Meade's quarterback. The next day, Eric punishes the whole team for their actions, with none of the players confessing responsibility. Matt is confronted by Arnett Meade players at his job, and is brutally beaten. He calls Eric to help him leave the hospital, forcing Eric to take Matt alongside him to a dance recital by Julie (Aimee Teegarden). Matt admits to his role in vandalizing the car, but refuses to disclose who else was involved in the raid.

At the dance recital, Eric apologizes to Tami (Connie Britton) for not understanding the difficulty of her job as a guidance counsellor, and appreciating her patience. Eric sees Matt conversing with Julie, and laments that he had accidentally encouraged him to ask her out. Lyla is surprised to find Tim in her bedroom, who states that he cannot stop thinking of her. Although confused, she gives in and they both share a kiss.

== Production ==
=== Development ===
In October 2006, NBC announced that the fourth episode of the season would be titled "Who's Your Daddy". The episode was written by consulting producer Kerry Ehrin and directed by Allison Liddi-Brown. This was Ehrin's first writing credit, and Liddi-Brown's first directing credit.

== Reception ==
=== Viewers ===
In its original American broadcast, "Who's Your Daddy" was seen by an estimated 6.27 million household viewers with a 2.2 in the 18–49 demographics. This means that 2.2 percent of all households with televisions watched the episode. It finished 68th out of 104 programs airing from October 23–29, 2006. This was a 5% decrease in viewership from the previous episode, which was watched by an estimated 6.55 million household viewers with a 2.3 in the 18–49 demographics.

=== Critical reviews ===
"Who's Your Daddy" received positive reviews from critics. Eric Goldman of IGN gave the episode a "good" 7.8 out of 10 and wrote, "Friday Night Lights was a bit below par this week. The opening scenes were a bit clunky, with some small moments and characters coming off a bit more hammy and unbelievable than is the norm for this decidedly genuine-feeling series. The portrayal of Voodoo so far is also questionable, as he is just such a smug, arrogant jerk, and feels too one-note at this point. Would he really go so far as to change the music, without permission, at a party of a team he has just joined and hasn't gotten to know at all yet? Luckily, the episode picked up considerably as it progressed."

Sonia Saraiya of The A.V. Club gave the episode an "A–" grade and wrote, "This is the thing about Friday Night Lights: It hits the same beats as every other teen soap opera on the planet, but it somehow still sticks, and sticks hard. And I think it accomplishes that by being relentless — we're given all the details of every character; and usually, the show doesn't pick sides." Alan Sepinwall wrote, "I don't know that this episode was quite as gripping as the first three, but I liked the extended focus on Saracen, as well as continued realistic friction in the Taylor marriage - and the meeting of the two stories when Coach realized he had just suggested that his quarterback get his daughter into the back of a Volkswagen (or similarly uncomfortable place)."

Brett Love of TV Squad wrote, "Overall, another good episode, and it sets up a ton of stuff for the big Monday show. Looking forward to it. Hopefully a couple million of those Heroes fans will stick around to see what "that football show" is all about." Television Without Pity gave the episode a "B+" grade.
