= El Accidente =

- Friday Night Lights episode
- Episode no.: Season 1 Episode 6
- Directed by: Dan Lerner
- Written by: Carter Harris
- Cinematography by: David Boyd
- Editing by: Stephen Michael
- Original release date: November 7, 2006
- Running time: 43 minutes

Guest appearances
- Aldis Hodge as Ray "Voodoo" Tatum; Walter Perez as Bobby "Bull" Reyes

Episode chronology
← Previous "Git'er Done"	Next → "Homecoming"
- Friday Night Lights (season 1)

"El Accidente" is the sixth episode of the first season of the American sports drama television series Friday Night Lights, inspired by the 1990 nonfiction book by H. G. Bissinger. The episode was written by supervising producer Carter Harris and directed by Dan Lerner. It originally aired on NBC on November 7, 2006.

The series is set in the fictional town of Dillon, a small, close-knit community in rural West Texas. It follows a high school football team, the Dillon Panthers. It features a set of characters, primarily connected to Coach Eric Taylor, his wife Tami, and their daughter Julie. In the episode, with Voodoo's future in jeopardy, Eric faces another public relations nightmare when a football player brutally attacks another student.

According to Nielsen Media Research, the episode was seen by an estimated 5.94 million household viewers and gained a 2.1 ratings share among adults aged 18–49. The episode received mostly positive reviews from critics, who praised the performances, themes and pacing.

== Plot ==
The Texas High School Athletic Administration announces that the investigation into Voodoo's (Aldis Hodge) eligibility will be postponed until the following week due to insufficient evidence. While the team dines at a restaurant, defensive end Bobby "Bull" Reyes (Walter Perez) brutally assaults Kurt Kaster (Brent McGregor), a friend of Matt (Zach Gilford), for questioning the importance of football.

The following day, Bobby is arrested during practice, and Kaster's mother confides in Tami (Connie Britton) that she fears Bobby could return to playing without consequence. Eric (Kyle Chandler) and Buddy (Brad Leland) leave to visit Bobby at the county jail, where Bobby lies by claiming that he was provoked into attacking Kaster after he called him "wetback", when it was actually Voodoo who said it. After bailing him out, Bobby repeats his lie to the media, although Tami is not convinced of his sincerity.

As Jason (Scott Porter) shows improvement, Lyla (Minka Kelly) decides to end her relationship with Tim (Taylor Kitsch), disappointing him. Later, Tim visits Jason, who scolds him for not visiting him, drawing comparisons between their new lives. To cheer him up, Tim decides to take Jason out of the facility for a day out. They run into Lyla, who is convinced by Jason in accompanying them. Tim is put in an awkward position with Jason's and Lyla's relationship, and privately asks her to leave it aside for Jason's sake. They take a few drinks on a campfire as they reminisce over their dreams. Tim and Lyla then take Jason back to the hospital, who thanks them for the day. Jason looks out the window and sees them intimately hugging in the distance, arousing suspicions that they are dating.

The board officially declares that Voodoo was eligible, allowing Dillon to maintain their victory. However, Matt's friendship with Landry (Jesse Plemons) is jeopardized as Landry confronts Matt for his complicity in Bobby's lie about Kaster. A guilt-ridden Matt visits Eric at his house, confessing that Voodoo was the person who said the slur, not Kaster. The next day, Eric apologizes to Kaster, expels Bobby from the team, and makes Voodoo take his place on defense. At night, Eric is visited by Buddy, who informs him that Voodoo went back to Louisiana after his school re-opened and that he had implied to a reporter that Dillon had violated eligibility policies when recruiting him, potentially re-opening the investigation.

== Production ==
=== Development ===
In October 2006, NBC announced that the sixth episode of the season would be titled "El Accidente". The episode was written by supervising producer Carter Harris and directed by Dan Lerner. This was Harris' first writing credit, and Lerner's first directing credit.

== Reception ==
=== Viewers ===
In its original American broadcast, "El Accidente" was seen by an estimated 5.94 million household viewers with a 2.1 in the 18–49 demographics. This means that 2.1 percent of all households with televisions watched the episode. It finished 68th out of 97 programs airing from November 6–12, 2006. This was a 29% decrease in viewership from the previous episode, which was watched by an estimated 8.26 million household viewers with a 2.9 in the 18–49 demographics.

=== Critical reviews ===
"El Accidente" received mostly positive reviews from critics. Eric Goldman of IGN gave the episode a "great" 8 out of 10 and wrote, "While there were some off moments occasionally, this was another well done episode of Friday Night Lights, which continues to be the most heartfelt of the new series this television season."

Sonia Saraiya of The A.V. Club gave the episode a "B+" grade and wrote, "'El Accidente' is a simple but well-balanced episode of Friday Night Lights, one that uses the altercation between Reyes and Castor as an opportunity to let men of principle be men of principle." Alan Sepinwall wrote, "As for the episode itself, a much stronger effort than last week. I like that the show isn't ignoring the realities of Street's recovery (the no ejaculation rule is a bummer, though I would think/hope it's temporary), yet is willing to be just sunny enough to show him and his two backstabbing pals having a fine old time on their day trip."

Brett Love of TV Squad wrote, "This show just keeps getting better. Episode six brought to a head a few different story lines that have been brewing over the course of the first five episodes, some bigger than others. And some more surprising than others. The episode should have been called Do The Right Thing, as we had a number of characters all struggling with that idea." Television Without Pity gave the episode a "B" grade.

Brad Leland submitted this episode for consideration for Outstanding Guest Actor in a Drama Series at the 59th Primetime Emmy Awards.
