= Git'er Done =

- Friday Night Lights episode
- Episode no.: Season 1 Episode 5
- Directed by: Mark Piznarski
- Written by: Patrick Massett; John Zinman
- Cinematography by: David Boyd
- Editing by: Peter B. Ellis; Marc Cohen
- Original release date: October 30, 2006
- Running time: 43 minutes

Guest appearances
- Aldis Hodge as Ray "Voodoo" Tatum; Kevin Rankin as Herc; Patrick J. Adams as Connor Hayes; Walter Perez as Bobby "Bull" Reyes

Episode chronology
← Previous "Who's Your Daddy"	Next → "El Accidente"
- Friday Night Lights (season 1)

"Git'er Done" is the fifth episode of the first season of the American sports drama television series Friday Night Lights, inspired by the 1990 nonfiction book by H. G. Bissinger. The episode was written by consulting producers Patrick Massett and John Zinman and directed by Mark Piznarski. It originally aired on NBC on October 30, 2006.

The series is set in the fictional town of Dillon, a small, close-knit community in rural West Texas. It follows a high school football team, the Dillon Panthers. It features a set of characters, primarily connected to Coach Eric Taylor, his wife Tami, and their daughter Julie. In the episode, Eric prepares to choose the starter quarterback for their next game, while Jason finds Herc's hobby.

According to Nielsen Media Research, the episode was seen by an estimated 8.26 million household viewers and gained a 2.9 ratings share among adults aged 18–49, making it the most-watched episode of the series. The episode received extremely positive reviews from critics, who praised the writing and character development.

== Plot ==
In the morning, Lyla (Minka Kelly) surprises her mother by going jogging instead of visiting Jason (Scott Porter). She actually leaves to visit Tim (Taylor Kitsch) at his house, where they continue their relationship. As Eric (Kyle Chandler) must make a decision on the quarterback set for the game, he has a conversation with Voodoo (Aldis Hodge). Voodoo makes it clear that he dislikes the town and its citizens, and only cares about making a career in order to get enrolled into Louisiana State University.

Jason is taken by Herc (Kevin Rankin) downtown, where he sees him playing quad rugby with other men. Jason is impressed with Herc's story, as he joined the team in order to move on from having his football career ended due to an injury similar to Jason's. At the restaurant, Tyra (Adrianne Palicki) meets Connor Hayes (Patrick J. Adams), a businessman from Los Angeles visiting Dillon for an oil field. Taking an interest in her, he invites her to accompany him. At the field, Tyra opens up about her disdain for oil businessmen, as her father lost his job as a rigger in the previous visit. Before he leaves for Los Angeles, Tyra visits him in his hotel room to have sex.

Eric is conflicted about the choice for quarterback, confiding that he feels Matt (Zach Gilford) is essential to the team but Voodoo might get them a better performance. After talking with Tami (Connie Britton), he informs Matt that Voodoo will be the quarterback. Matt is disappointed, but understands his decision. Before the game starts, Lyla, Eric and the Panthers visit Jason at the hospital. This includes Tim, finally facing his friend in the hospital. After everyone leaves, Jason cries alone.

During the game, Voodoo ignores Eric's play calls. This results in a touchdown for Dillon, but also a pick six that gives Arnett Meade a touchdown lead by halftime. An irate Eric dismisses Voodoo from the game, and appoints Matt as the new quarterback. With just a few seconds left, Dillon manages to score a touchdown, with one point short of tying Arnett Meade. Eric and Matt decide to instead go for the two-point conversion and win the game. Smash (Gaius Charles) barely manages to score, allowing Dillon to win 22–21. The following day, Eric is approached by two representatives from the district executive committee. They inform him that they are investigating Voodoo's legality on the team, and that if there is substantial evidence to confirm suspicions, Voodoo will be taken off the team and Dillon will lose its win from the previous night.

== Production ==
=== Development ===
In October 2006, NBC announced that the fifth episode of the season would be titled "Git'er Done". The episode was written by consulting producers Patrick Massett and John Zinman, and directed by Mark Piznarski. This was Massett's first writing credit, Zinman's first writing credit, and Piznarski's first directing credit.

== Reception ==
=== Viewers ===
While the previous episodes aired on Tuesdays at 8:00 p.m., NBC chose to air the episode on Monday at 10:00 p.m., replacing a Studio 60 on the Sunset Strip rerun. This allowed the series to air after the network's breakout series, Heroes.

In its original American broadcast, "Git'er Done" was seen by an estimated 8.26 million household viewers with a 2.9 in the 18–49 demographics. This means that 2.9 percent of all households with televisions watched the episode. It finished 52nd out of 102 programs airing from October 30-November 5, 2006. This was a 31% increase in viewership from the previous episode, which was watched by an estimated 6.27 million household viewers with a 2.2 in the 18–49 demographics.

=== Critical reviews ===
"Git'er Done" received extremely positive reviews from critics. Eric Goldman of IGN gave the episode a "great" 8.8 out of 10 and wrote, "Friday Night Lights continues to take basic stories and make them ridiculously involving."

Sonia Saraiya of The A.V. Club gave the episode a "B+" grade and wrote, "I don't doubt the realism of this story — or the values of the show's writers. If anything, I think it's more honest that the story went down this way. It's not Friday Night Lights' job to recast Texas to be something it's not — or to recast football into something it's not. But the impression I got from this story between Matt and Voodoo is not that Matt is the good guy, but rather that it's easier to believe that he's the good guy." Alan Sepinwall wrote, "There were parts of it that were very strong (the team visit to Street's room), and overall it was fine, but compared to previous weeks, it felt like a drop-off."

Brett Love of TV Squad wrote, "Another good episode. I just keep liking this show more and more. Hopefully some of those Heroes fans stuck around tonight and got an idea of what NBC has going on with Friday Night Lights." Television Without Pity gave the episode a "B+" grade.
