= August Evening =

2007 film by Chris Eska

- DVD cover
- Directed by: Chris Eska
- Written by: Chris Eska
- Produced by: Connie Hill; Jason Wehling
- Starring: Pedro Castaneda; Veronica Loren; Abel Becerra; Walter Perez; Sandra Rios; Raquel Gavia; Cesar Flores
- Cinematography: Yasu Tanida
- Edited by: Chris Eska
- Music by: Windy & Carl; Masakatsu Takagi; Jonathan Hughes
- Production companies: Maya Pictures; Doki-Doki Productions
- Distributed by: Maya Entertainment
- Release dates: June 21, 2007 (LAFF); September 5, 2008 (United States)
- Running time: 128 minutes
- Country: United States
- Language: Spanish
- Budget: $35,000
- Box office: $74,759

August Evening is a 2007 Spanish-language American drama film written, directed, and edited by Chris Eska (in his feature directorial debut). It stars Pedro Castaneda, Veronica Loren, Abel Becerra, Walter Perez, Sandra Rios, Raquel Gavia, and Cesar Flores. It follows the relationship between an aging, undocumented farm worker and his young, widowed daughter-in-law.

The film had its world premiere at the Los Angeles Film Festival on June 21, 2007, where it won the Target Filmmaker Award and the Best Ensemble Acting Award. It was theatrically released in the United States on September 5, 2008, by Maya Entertainment. It received positive reviews from critics, who mostly praised the performances of Castaneda and Loren. At the 23rd Independent Spirit Awards, the film was given the John Cassavetes Award and Castaneda was nominated for Best Male Lead.

== Cast ==
As appearing in screen credits (main roles identified):

- Pedro Castaneda as Jaime
- Veronica Loren as Lupe
- Abel Becerra as Victor
- Walter Perez as Luis
- Sandra Rios as Alice
- Raquel Gavia as Maria
- Cesar Flores as Salazar
- Grisel Rodriguez as Andrea
- Tom Spry as Jason
- Jeremy Becerra as Gabe
- Ethan Mallen as Matthew
- Amelia Castillo as Juana
- Richard Moreno as Manuel
- Rosalba Aguayo Villegas as Wedding Photographer
- Stella Romero as Grocery Cashier
- Benito Lara as Diego
- Marina Hernandez as Young 'Maria' at Cleaners

== Production ==
Chris Eska wrote the screenplay in just a few weeks, drawing inspiration from his own family and from Latino families he knew in Texas. In a 2008 interview, Eska recalled how the idea for August Evening came about:

I wanted to explore ideas that were important to me and that I rarely see in other films, even if it wouldn't strike Hollywood types as a potential blockbuster. The film deals with the meaning of family, the inevitability of change, the bittersweet nature of life, and finding peace with life's imperfections.

Eska began casting in California and Texas in May 2005, with non-actor Pedro Castaneda selected to play the lead role. The film was shot in Gonzales, Texas in August 2005, and over 55 hours of footage was sifted and edited during the course of 2006.

== Reception ==
=== Critical response ===
On the review aggregator website Rotten Tomatoes, 92% of 24 critics' reviews are positive, with an average rating of 7.1/10. The website's consensus reads: "Chris Eska's debut feature is a simple but compelling film, with strong performances and a story that moves along slowly but never fails to engage its audience." Metacritic, which uses a weighted average, assigned the film a score of 68 out of 100, based on 11 critics, indicating "generally favorable" reviews.

Stephen Holden of The New York Times opined, "As the movie inches along, its virtues turn into faults. Its elliptical style leaves unanswered questions, the pace begins to feel choppy, and the lyrical pauses become a recurrent tic." Karen Durbin of the same newspaper called the film "a deceptively quiet, Ozu-like drama set in southwest Texas" and praised Castaneda for his "remarkably eloquent" performance.

Gary Goldstein of the Los Angeles Times described August Evening as "a poignant film filled with ample rewards for those who submit to its leisurely pace and gentle observations" and wrote, "This artful film inches toward its not-unpredictable conclusion and could logically have ended several times before its final fadeout."

Robert Koehler of Variety called the film "overly precious and studied" and noted, "Nonpro Castaneda and first-timer Loren sink deeper and deeper into their roles as the film progresses." However, Koehler criticized, "The complex visual concepts and sly narrative schemes of the Asian helmers Eska is clearly fond of tend to get translated here in rather superficial terms."

Stephen Farber of The Hollywood Reporter remarked, "The performances are first rate", "Cinematographer Yasu Tanida does a fine job depicting the desolate Texas landscapes", and "This film combines perfectly honed, naturalistic acting and visual lyricism."

Lisa Schwarzbaum of Entertainment Weekly gave the film a "B+" rating and commented, "The filmmaker of August Evening creates a succession of quiet, elliptical scenes that accrue into an affecting big picture of family ties and immigrant experience."

=== Accolades ===
- Winner, Independent Spirit Award for Cassavetes Award (given to a feature film made for under $500,000)
- Nominated, Independent Spirit Award for Best Male Lead (Pedro Castaneda) (others nominated in this category: Don Cheadle, Philip Seymour Hoffman and Frank Langella.)
- Winner, Target Award for Best Film, Los Angeles Film Festival
- Winner, Best Acting Ensemble, Los Angeles Film Festival
- Nominated, Gotham Independent Film Award for Breakthrough Actor (Pedro Castaneda)
- Winner, Maverick Award for Best Film, Woodstock Film Festival
- Winner, Best Film, Ashland Independent Film Festival
- Winner, Best Cinematography, Phoenix Film Festival
- Winner, Opera Prima Jury Award (Best First Feature), International Latino Film Festival – San Francisco Bay Area
- Winner, Best Actress, Zimbabwe International Film Festival (Veronica Loren)
- Winner, Texas Filmmakers Production Fund Award 2005, Austin Film Society
- Winner, Texas Filmmakers Production Fund Award 2006, Austin Film Society
