= 8 Simple Rules =

American television sitcom (2002–2005)

- Also known as: 8 Simple Rules... for Dating My Teenage Daughter (seasons 1–2)
- Genre: Sitcom
- Created by: Tracy Gamble
- Based on: 8 Simple Rules for Dating My Teenage Daughter by W. Bruce Cameron
- Starring: John Ritter; Katey Sagal; Kaley Cuoco; Amy Davidson; Martin Spanjers; James Garner; David Spade
- Composer: Dan Foliart
- Country of origin: United States
- Original language: English
- No. of seasons: 3
- No. of episodes: 76 (list of episodes)

Production
- Executive producers: Tom Shadyac; Michael Bostick; Tracy Gamble; Flody Suarez; James Widdoes; Judd Pillot; John Peaslee
- Running time: 22 minutes
- Production companies: Shady Acres Entertainment; Flody Co. (2002–2004); Tracy Gamble Productions (2004); Touchstone Television

Original release
- Network: ABC
- Release: September 17, 2002 – April 15, 2005

8 Simple Rules (originally 8 Simple Rules... for Dating My Teenage Daughter) is an American television sitcom originally starring John Ritter and Katey Sagal as middle-class parents Paul and Cate Hennessy, raising their three children. Kaley Cuoco, Amy Davidson, and Martin Spanjers co-starred as their teenage kids: Bridget, Kerry, and Rory. The series aired on ABC from September 17, 2002, to April 15, 2005. The first season focused on Paul being left in charge of the children after Cate takes a full-time job as a nurse, with comic emphasis on his often strict rules concerning his daughters and dating. The series' name and premise were derived from the book 8 Simple Rules for Dating My Teenage Daughter by W. Bruce Cameron.

While 8 Simple Rules was renewed for a second season and production had begun, Ritter's sudden death on September 11, 2003 left the series in an uncertain position. After a hiatus, the series returned and killed off his character. James Garner and David Spade later joined the main cast as Cate's father Jim Egan and her nephew C.J. Barnes. In May 2005, after three seasons, ABC cancelled 8 Simple Rules due to low ratings. 76 episodes were produced.

== Episodes ==
Season	Episodes	Originally released		Average viewers (in millions)	Rank
Season	Episodes	First released	Last released	Average viewers (in millions)	Rank
1	28	September 17, 2002	May 20, 2003	10.9	#46
2	24	September 23, 2003	May 18, 2004	10.0	#50
3	24	September 24, 2004	April 15, 2005	6.8	#90

== Characters ==
=== Main ===
- Paul Hennessy, portrayed by John Ritter (2002–2003), is a former sportswriter who works from home as a lifestyle columnist. He is a protective father whose nature often embarrasses his children and leads them to accuse him of hypocrisy. Following Ritter's death, Paul dies offscreen early in the second season, having suddenly collapsed in a grocery store while buying milk.
- Cate S. Hennessy (née Egan), portrayed by Katey Sagal, is the wife, mother, nurse, and easily the most sane and composed person in the family. She takes a nursing job at the kids' school so that she can work standard hours and spend more time with the kids. Cate starts dating her kids' high-school principal, Ed Gibb (portrayed by Adam Arkin), towards the end of Season 3. During her teens, she was just as popular, scheming, and rebellious as Bridget, and as such, she is usually the first to notice when Bridget is up to something. Her middle name is Stinky because her father had promised his best friend that he would name one of his children after him after having accidentally stabbed him with a bayonet while they were drunk in Korea; to hide this, she claims that the "S" stands for Stacy.
- Bridget Erin "Beach" Hennessy, portrayed by Kaley Cuoco, is the beautiful, ditzy oldest child. She is depicted as a stereotypical blonde, a popular bombshell who is preoccupied with her looks, teenage boys, and little else. However, she sometimes displays intelligence or profundity in a poignant manner. Her favorite book is J. D. Salinger's The Catcher in the Rye. After her father dies, she begins to steadily mature. Bridget immediately feels guilty about Paul's death because the last words that she had ever spoken to him were "I hate you" after arguing with him on the morning of his death. In Season 2, Bridget is revealed to have been conceived on a beach.
- Kerry "Care Bear" Hennessy, portrayed by Amy Davidson, is the disgruntled middle child. She is often seen as unattractive when compared to her beautiful older sister. Bridget accuses her of stealing her boyfriend Kyle, though her own actions had driven Kyle away. Kerry is typically negative and sarcastic, often making snide remarks about others. She is also a passionate activist who cares about animal rights. She loses her virginity to Bruno (her boyfriend in Europe) later in the third season. She is often annoyed at her sister and is easily upset, yet frequently the two girls team up against their parents' authority or at the expense of their brother. Kerry is also very artistic and keeps a sketchbook. She is the smart child, but often shows naiveté. After she starts dating Bridget's popular ex-boyfriend Kyle, her own popularity increases, and she begins to act a bit more like her older sister.
- Rory Joseph Hennessy, portrayed by Martin Spanjers, is Cate and Paul's son and their youngest child. He often takes pleasure in tattling on his sisters. Usually he waits until his sisters have already committed an infraction, then tells his father, who explodes. Rory is his father's favorite child. He becomes involved in money-making schemes with C.J. He is commonly seen playing in the living room and mentions wanting a monkey; he had once acquired a monkey by trading some of his father's baseball cards, and later traded the monkey for a guitar. He also delights in showing his friends the private aspects of his sister Bridget's life, mentioning once that his friends looted Bridget's underwear drawer. Rory is hit hard by Paul's death and punches a hole in his wall out of anger, cutting his hand. He explains the injury as a burn from having removed a hot casserole from the oven. After he enters high school, Rory matures, leaving C.J. to be the main wisecracker of the family.
- Jim Egan, portrayed by James Garner (2003–2005), is Cate's father. Jim served in the Korean War and is proud of his service (he becomes angry whenever the war is called a "police action"). He is very protective of the family. He often sneaks away to smoke tobacco. He is divorced, having formerly resided in Florida before moving into Cate's basement, and often tries to beat C.J. with his cane. He takes pride in C.J.'s success as a teacher.
- C.J. Barnes, portrayed by David Spade (2004–2005), is Cate's nephew. He was once in the army and claims to have studied aerial photography during the Gulf War, and to have received a Purple Heart in combat, which is in contrast to his generally childish attitude. He is a teacher who often pursues women, though unsuccessfully. When C.J. first arrives, the family is initially surprised. He reveals that he was ashamed that he did not live up to Paul's expectations and avoided them because of that. He lives with his grandfather, Jim, in the basement (having previously lived in a van, which Jim had burned). He once dated Mrs. Krupp, Kerry and Bridget's math teacher, but cheated on her with his ex-girlfriend Cheryl. He reveals that his first initial stands for Corey. C.J. previously smoked marijuana heavily (and in fact used to smoke with Kyle's older brother), but he claims to not have touched it in two years (he originally claims it was five years, though he relents after Jim expresses disbelief).

=== Recurring ===
- Kyle, portrayed by Billy Aaron Brown, is Bridget's – and later Kerry's – boyfriend. He is often seen spending time with Rory when not with either Kerry or Bridget. His father, Tommy, used to work with Paul.
- Ed Gibb, portrayed by Adam Arkin, is the principal of the local high school. He and Cate knew each other in high school, and even dated. Their accounts of their first romantic encounter are different, each professing to have had more self-control. Despite this, they have some very intimate moments.
- Nick Sharpe, portrayed by Patrick Warburton, is Paul’s editor at the newspaper. He takes Paul’s place at the sportswriters' poker game and he and Paul frequently commiserate about having teenage daughters.
- Coach Scott, portrayed by Dan Cortese, is a high-school coach on whom Bridget had a crush. He likes Cate, and Cate initially likes him, but then discovers Bridget's crush, which causes her to deny Scott's romantic advances towards her.
- Jenna Sharpe, portrayed by Nikki Danielle Moore (2003–2005), is the daughter of Paul's boss Nick, and one of Bridget's rivals, who later becomes her friend. She has a younger sister, Rachael (Nicole Mansour), who is a friend of Kerry.
- Missy Kleinfeld, portrayed by Daniella Monet (2003–2004), is Rory's love interest in Season 2. She has a sister, Sissy (Elena Lyons), who likes C.J.
- Jeremy, portrayed by Jonathan Taylor Thomas (2004), is Bridget's tutor and eventual boyfriend. He is considered a nerd at school, and because of this, Bridget at first denies her interest in him.
- Anthony W., portrayed by Cole Williams (2002–2003), is a student in Bridget's class. He is a white boy who speaks like a black rapper, often resulting in confusion. In "Cool Parent", he is shown to play lacrosse.
- Maggie Barnes (née Egan), portrayed by Cybill Shepherd, is Cate's sister and C.J.'s mother. Maggie shares the same sensitive, moody nature as Kerry. However, it appears (from a conversation between Ed Gibb and Cate) that Cate was the smarter one, as well as being more popular.
- Fred Doyle, portrayed by John Ratzenberger, is a persistent and overly friendly neighbor of the Hennessys, and husband of Mary Ellen (portrayed originally by Shelley Long and then by Cindy Williams). He is the father of Donald "Donny" Doyle, who has dated Bridget for some time. Fred is the head of the neighborhood watch, and his family is religious.
- Mrs. Krupp, portrayed by Suzy Nakamura, is a math teacher at the school.
- Damian, portrayed by Paul Wesley, is Bridget's ex-boyfriend who appears in two episodes.
- Lacey/Lacy, portrayed by Kala Savage (2003–2004), is Bridget's friend who appears in three episodes.
- Laura Egan, portrayed by Suzanne Pleshette, is Cate and Maggie's mother.
- Tommy, portrayed by Larry Miller, a co-worker of Paul, and Kyle's dad.

=== Guest appearances ===
- Pamela Anderson
- Terry Bradshaw
- Nick Carter
- Dan Cortese
- Mo Gaffney
- Beth Grant
- Josh Henderson
- Matt Lanter
- Thad Luckinbill
- Tatum O'Neal
- Ed O'Neill
- Jason Priestly
- Shawn Pyfrom
- Nicole Richie
- Connie Sawyer
- Connie Stevens
- Raquel Welch

== Production ==
=== Ritter's death ===
The first three episodes of the series' second season had been completed when Ritter experienced discomfort during a rehearsal on the afternoon of September 11, 2003. Crew members took him to a nearby hospital, Providence Saint Joseph Medical Center (the same hospital where Ritter was born), where he was misdiagnosed as having a heart attack; as a result, by the time physicians diagnosed him with an aortic dissection, his condition had worsened. He died that night at the age of 54. Two days after Ritter's funeral, Disney CEO, Michael Eisner weighed in with an email to ABC Entertainment Chairman, Lloyd Braun, and President, Susan Lyne, outlining how they should resume the series; Eisner proposed that Cate, Ritter’s wife in the show, played by Katey Sagal, be pregnant (she’d had a pregnancy scare in an earlier episode). Then she could give birth for the May sweeps week. Before the TV executives could respond, Eisner’s number-two (Disney's President and COO), Bob Iger, weighed in with an email, cheerleading his boss’s proposal. Nevertheless, Braun and Lyne were both appalled; they were still undecided about resuming the series at all, but to suggest that Ritter’s character would be leaving a baby behind was going too far. It seemed unspeakably exploitative to capitalize on Ritter’s death by making his wife pregnant and having her give birth during the May sweeps. After highly emotional arguments between both factions, where Eisner accused Braun and Lyne of behaving as elitists, the pregnancy pitch eventually faded.

Following Ritter's death, ABC announced that 8 Simple Rules would continue after a hiatus and would incorporate the death of Ritter's character. The three new episodes that Ritter had completed were aired with an introduction by Sagal.

8 Simple Rules returned two months after Ritter's death with a one-hour episode, "Goodbye", which was turned into a tribute to Ritter's character. Subsequent episodes dealt with the family's reaction to his death and how they moved on from it. The first four post-Ritter episodes were shot without a live audience with James Garner and Suzanne Pleshette guest-starring as Cate's strict but loving parents and David Spade guest-starring as Cate's wayward nephew, C.J. Barnes. Garner and Spade later received starring roles in order to fill the void left by Ritter for the remainder of the series' run.

=== Third season and cancellation ===
Before Ritter's death, 8 Simple Rules ranked 46 in the Nielsen ratings. After Ritter's death, it had slipped to 50th, but was renewed for a third season, in which ABC moved the series to Friday at 8:00 p.m. as part of its TGIF comedy line-up. The series' creator and show-runner, Tracy Gamble, left the series for a time over creative differences prior to the third season, but he later returned as a consulting producer midway through the season. Gamble was replaced by Judd Pillot and John Peaslee, who had performed the same role in the final season of Spade's sitcom Just Shoot Me!. The series plunged to 90 in the ratings. Even before the third-season finale's airing, rumors began circulating that 8 Simple Rules was facing cancellation because of Ritter's death and poor ratings. The Friday night "death slot" ratings took their toll on 8 Simple Rules. The third-season finale was not aired for May sweeps. The finale received a 3.9/8 rating share, which gave ABC a third-place finish behind NBC's Dateline (5.8/11) and CBS's Joan of Arcadia (4.9/10), which starred Ritter's son, Jason. ABC officially cancelled 8 Simple Rules in May 2005.

== Syndication ==
While the ratings for 8 Simple Rules were well above those of the surrounding TGIF shows during the show's third season, ABC canceled it because of a perceived inability to sell reruns of the show into syndication; a fourth season would have given the show one hundred episodes, traditionally considered the minimum number of episodes necessary for a show to successfully enter daily syndication.

On July 11, 2005 (less than two months after ABC officially canceled the show), The WB network announced that it would air all 76 episodes of 8 Simple Rules from 4–5 p.m. as part of its replacement of Kids' WB with the Daytime WB block, aimed at a broader audience. The show aired weekdays from January 2, 2006, to September 15, 2006, when it was replaced by Reba upon the merger of UPN and The WB into The CW.

On Tuesday, June 12, 2007, the show joined the ABC Family lineup, airing weekdays from 6:00 to 7:00 p.m. In September 2008, the show began airing from 3:00 to 4:00 p.m., continuing at that time until October 10, 2008. On October 3, 2009, 8 Simple Rules returned to ABC Family, having been absent for a year, airing on Saturdays from 10:00 to 11:00 a.m., and Sundays from 11:00 a.m. to 12:00 p.m. Airings have been sporadic because of the channel's unpredictable movie schedule and holiday programming block. On February 8, 2010, the series was added back to ABC Family's weekday lineup, airing from 6:00 to 7:00 p.m. Eastern Time, replacing The Fresh Prince of Bel-Air. After a few more months of absence, 8 Simple Rules resumed on ABC Family at 7:00 p.m. ET on select weekend mornings, beginning on July 18, 2010. In mid-December 2012, 8 Simple Rules was removed from ABC Family's weekday lineup, only to be added back in September 2013. The series was removed from the network's lineup once again in 2014.

In the United Kingdom, the show began airing on the Disney Channel in 2003, with the episodes edited for a children's audience. It was picked up by ABC1, which aired it until the channel's closure in 2007. The same year, Channel 5 began airing Season 1 of the series. From 2008, all three seasons of the show were aired on 5*. The series was aired uncut on subsequent channels following its cancellation by Disney Channel. Both Channel 5 and 5* aired the series in its original widescreen format. In 2017, Comedy Central obtained the rights to the show and started airing it on June 12, 2017.

In Denmark, 8 Simple Rules aired on TV3.

In Canada, the show aired on YTV and ABC Spark (the Canadian version of Freeform).

In the Republic of Ireland, 8 Simple Rules aired on RTÉ Two. Later, rights to the show were acquired by TG4, which aired the series weeknights at 5:35 p.m. The series was shown on both channels uncut, despite the early time of day, but the show was issued an age rating. On RTÉ Two, it was issued a "PS" rating, though it received a "12" rating on TG4.

In Israel, the show was broadcast by satellite provider yes, using its shortened title 8 Simple Rules in Hebrew ("8 כללים פשוטים").

== Home media ==
On August 7, 2007, Walt Disney Studios Home Entertainment released Season 1 of 8 Simple Rules on DVD in Region 1. Season 1 was released in the UK on September 1, 2008.

In August 2008, Lionsgate Home Entertainment announced that it had acquired the rights to the series from ABC Studios. Lionsgate subsequently released Season 2 on DVD in Region 1 on May 19, 2009.

DVD name	Ep #	Region 1	Region 2	Region 4
The Complete First Season	28	August 7, 2007	September 1, 2008	November 12, 2008
The Complete Second Season	24	May 19, 2009	TBA	TBA

The first 2 seasons of the series were released on Disney+ on May 20, 2022. For reasons unknown, season 3 is absent from the service.

== Reception ==
=== Critical reception ===
On review aggregation website Rotten Tomatoes, the first season reports a 57% approval rating, based on 21 reviews. In a review for Variety, Michael Speier deemed the series unoriginal, but did praise the cast performances, especially John Ritter. Critical of the show's humor, he did go on to comment, "nothing even remotely deep here, but Rules isn't as silly as some of its plotlines suggest. Going for the mass appeal, bow's reach goes a little too far, trying to appease every single potential audience member off the bat with standard-fare jokes about clothing, dating and busy spouses. It would really be something if execs went for the slowburn once in a while, letting some of these shows breathe before jamming punchlines down viewers' throats."

The second season reports a 60% approval rating on Rotten Tomatoes, based on 5 reviews.

=== U.S. television ratings ===
Viewership and ratings per season of 8 Simple Rules
Season	Timeslot (ET)	Episodes	First aired		Last aired		TV season	Viewership rank	Avg. viewers (millions)
Season	Timeslot (ET)	Episodes	Date	Viewers (millions)	Date	Viewers (millions)	TV season	Viewership rank	Avg. viewers (millions)
1	Tuesday 8:00 pm	28	September 17, 2002	17.29	May 20, 2003	7.88	2002–03	46	10.9
2	Tuesday 8:00 pm	24	September 23, 2003	16.97	May 18, 2004	7.54	2003–04	50	10.0
3	Friday 8:00 pm	24	September 24, 2004	6.11	April 15, 2005	5.26	2004–05	90	6.8

=== Accolades ===
Year	Award	Category	Recipient	Result	Ref(s)
2003	Art Directors Guild Awards	Multi–Camera Television Series	Jay Pelissier (episode: "All I Want for Christmas")	Nominated	
2003	ASCAP Film & TV Awards	Top TV Series	Dan Foliart	Won	
2003	British Academy Children's Awards	Best International	8 Simple Rules	Nominated	
2003	Artios Awards	Outstanding Achievement in Comedy Pilot Casting	Lori Openden	Nominated	
2003	Genesis Awards	Best TV Comedy Series	"8 Simple Rules" (episode: "Goodbye")	Won	
2003	People's Choice Awards	Favorite Television New Comedy Series	8 Simple Rules	Won	
2003	Teen Choice Awards	Choice TV Comedy	8 Simple Rules	Nominated	
2003	Teen Choice Awards	Choice TV Actress: Comedy	Kaley Cuoco	Nominated	
2003	Teen Choice Awards	Choice Breakout TV Show	8 Simple Rules	Won	
2003	Teen Choice Awards	Choice Breakout TV Actress	Kaley Cuoco	Won	
2003	Young Artist Award	Best Performance in a TV Series (Comedy or Drama) - Leading Young Actress	Kaley Cuoco	Nominated	
2003	Young Artist Award	Best Performance in A TV Series (Comedy or Drama) - Leading Young Actor	Martin Spanjers	Nominated	
2004	British Academy Children's Awards	Best International	8 Simple Rules	Won	
2004	Directors Guild of America Awards	Outstanding Directing – Comedy Series	James Widdoes (episode: "Goodbye")	Nominated	
2004	Primetime Emmy Awards	Cinematography for a Multi-Camera Series	Bruce L. Finn (episode: "Goodbye”)	Won	
2004	Primetime Emmy Awards	Lead Actor in a Comedy Series	John Ritter (posthumously)	Nominated	
2004	Teen Choice Awards	Choice TV Actress: Comedy	Kaley Cuoco	Nominated	
2004	Young Artist Award	Best Young Adult Performer in a Teenage Role	Kaley Cuoco	Nominated	
2004	Young Artist Award	Best Performance in a TV Series - Recurring Young Actress	Kaitlin Callum	Nominated	
2004	Young Artist Award	Best Performance in a TV Series (Comedy or Drama) - Leading Young Actor	Martin Spanjers	Won	
2005	Genesis Awards	Sid Caesar Comedy Award	Episode – "Finale: Part Deux"	Won	
2005	Prism Awards	Performance in a Comedy Series	Katey Sagal	Won	
2005	Prism Awards	TV Comedy Episode	Episode: "Consequences"	Nominated	
