= California Winter =

- Film poster
- Directed by: Odin Ozdil
- Written by: Odin Ozdil
- Release date: 2012
- Country: United States
- Language: English

California Winter is a 2012 American drama film written and directed by Odin Ozdil. It had its world premiere at Dances With Films in 2013.

== Synopsis ==
In 2005, Clara Morales begins an upward career in real estate, encouraging risky loans to their customers in order to afford the homes above their means - loans that she did not fully understand. She also advises her father to take such a loan. With the onset of the housing market slump of 2008, the house of Clara's father goes to auction. She tries to save her childhood home which brings her new problems.

== Cast ==
Actor	Role
Michael Ironside	Sheriff Hillman
Rutina Wesley	Marcy Sanchez
Erick Avari	Douglas Hariri
A Martinez	Miguel Morales
Elizabeth Dominguez	Clara Morales
Walter Perez	Carlos Gonzalez
Laura Cerón	Camila Vasquez
Kendell Johnson	Walter Sanchez
Sean Patrick Murphy	Ken Richmond
Dustin Fitzsimons	Brad Hutchins
Louie Alegria	Geraldo Ramirez
Miguel Bocanegra	Mario Chavez
John Bolen	Leo Porter
Alberto Carroll	Miguel
Eliana Alexander	Cecilia Morales
Amaris Dupree	Paula Ruiz
Justin Fair	Alan Thomas
Joseph A. Garcia	Juan Ruiz
Brian Leahy	Dep. Blake
Rod McLachlan	Howard Gorski
Lee Anne Moore	Angie
John Pirruccello	Jim Whedon
Teresa Reilly	Christy
Leonard Roberts	Larry Johnson
Gina Rodriguez	Ofelia Ramirez
Foster Wilson	Ilene
Nadeya Ward	Waitress
Josh Megdell	Doctor
Chad Ridgely	Officer Barnes
John Bryant	Antonio
