= Detention (2010 film) =

- Theatrical release poster
- Directed by: James D.R. Hickox
- Screenplay by: Michael Muscal; John Stienfield
- Story by: James D.R. Hickox; Stephen Johnston
- Release date: January 15, 2010
- Running time: 81m 6s

Detention is a 2010 horror film starring Preston Jones and David Carradine.

== Plot ==
A mismatched group of students at Reseda High School are sentenced to detention one stormy afternoon, and when their teacher vanishes and strange goings-on occur within the high school, they discover to their horror that ghosts have risen to avenge the brutal death of a student in the 1970s - a death for which their parents were responsible.

== Cast ==
- Preston Jones as Paul
- Maitland McConnell as Lisa
- Alexa Jago as Ms. Cipher
- David Carradine as Principal Hoskins
- Zelda Williams as Sara
- Michael Mitchell as Sam
- Anthony Chute as Brad
- Jonathan 'Lil J' McDaniel as T-Loc
- Katie Condidorio as Rachel
- Thomas Calabro as Coach L
- Billy Aaron Brown as Jack
- Black Thomas as Jackson
- Catherine Combs as Diane
- Gregory Mikurak as Gabriel
- Shel Rasten as Will
- Rachel Sterling as Mimi
- Anthony Campanello as Bobby
