= The Park Bench =

- Directed by: Ann LeSchander
- Written by: Ann LeSchander
- Produced by: Ann LeSchander; Walter Perez; Angel Thompson
- Starring: Walter Perez; Nikki Danielle Moore
- Cinematography: Gareth Taylor
- Edited by: Robert McFalls
- Music by: Dan Raziel
- Production companies: Angel Powers Productions; Cake & Ice Cream Productions
- Distributed by: Dreamscape Media
- Release date: 18 October 2014 (LA Femme International Film Festival)
- Running time: 78 minutes
- Country: United States
- Language: English

The Park Bench is a 2014 American romantic comedy film directed by Ann LeSchander, starring Walter Perez and Nikki Danielle Moore.

== Cast ==
- Walter Perez as Mateo
- Nikki Danielle Moore as Emily
- Stella Maeve as Maribel
- John Prosky as Professor McIntyre
- Brian Mulligan as Birdwatcher
- Dustin Fitzsimons as Eddie
- Beau Bonness as Bennett Davis

== Reception ==
Katie Walsh of the Los Angeles Times wrote that the film is a "sweet tale with a smart storytelling device and charming performers, but not much more beyond the cute."

Scott Tobias of Variety praised the performances of Perez and Moore but wrote that LeSchander "barely skims the surface of her book-smarts and his street-smarts, much less the cultural forces that keep them apart."

Frank Scheck of The Hollywood Reporter also praised the performances of Perez and Moore but wrote that the "narrative skimpiness makes their efforts for naught."
