= List of 8 Simple Rules episodes =

8 Simple Rules (originally known as 8 Simple Rules for Dating My Teenage Daughter for its first two seasons) is an American television sitcom that originally aired on ABC from September 17, 2002 to April 15, 2005. Loosely based on humor columnist W. Bruce Cameron's book of the same name, the show starred John Ritter during its first season. After Ritter's sudden death, Katey Sagal took over the show's starring position for the rest of the series' run. In total, 76 episodes were produced, spanning three seasons.

== Series overview ==
Season	Episodes	Originally released		Average viewers (in millions)	Rank
Season	Episodes	First released	Last released	Average viewers (in millions)	Rank
1	28	September 17, 2002	May 20, 2003	10.9	#46
2	24	September 23, 2003	May 18, 2004	10.0	#50
3	24	September 24, 2004	April 15, 2005	6.8	#90

== Episodes ==
=== Season 1 (2002–03) ===
No. overall	No. in season	Title	Directed by	Written by	Original release date	Prod. code	U.S. viewers (millions)
1	1	"Pilot"	Gil Junger	Tracy Gamble	September 17, 2002	101	17.29
2	2	"Wall of Shame"	James Widdoes	Story by : W. Bruce Cameron; Teleplay by : Mike Langworthy	September 24, 2002	104, SC R-133	12.83
3	3	"Bridget's First Job"	James Widdoes	Bill Daly	October 1, 2002	105, SC R-134	13.41
4	4	"Wings"	James Widdoes	Story by : W. Bruce Cameron; Teleplay by : Bill Daly & Bonnie Kallman	October 8, 2002	106, SC R-135	14.97
5	5	"Son-in-Law"	James Widdoes	Story by : W. Bruce Cameron; Teleplay by : Tracy Gamble & Martin Weiss	October 15, 2002	103, SC R-132	13.07
6	6	"Cheerleader"	James Widdoes	Story by : W. Bruce Cameron; Teleplay by : Paul Ciancarelli & David DiPietro	October 22, 2002	102, SC R-131	14.16
7	7	"Trick or Treehouse"	James Widdoes	Story by : W. Bruce Cameron; Teleplay by : Bonnie Kallman	October 29, 2002	107, SC R-136	13.49
8	8	"By the Book"	James Widdoes	Paul Ciancarelli & David DiPietro	November 5, 2002	108, SC R-137	12.75
9	9	"Two Boys for Every Girl"	James Widdoes	Bill Callahan & Philip Wen	November 12, 2002	109, SC R-138	12.83
10	10	"Give It Up"	James Widdoes	Martin Weiss	November 19, 2002	110, SC R-139	12.68
11	11	"Paul Meets His Match"	James Widdoes	Story by : Dena Waxman; Teleplay by : Bonnie Kallman & Martin Weiss	November 26, 2002	112, SC R-141	12.60
12	12	"All I Want For Christmas"	James Widdoes	Christy Jacobs White	December 10, 2002	113, SC R-142	12.87
13	13	"Rory's Got a Girlfriend"	James Widdoes	Bill Daly	December 17, 2002	111, SC R-140	11.54
14	14	"Career Choices"	Terry Hughes	Amy Engelberg & Wendy Engelberg	January 7, 2003	114, SC R-143	12.34
15	15	"Kerry's Big Adventure"	James Widdoes	Tracy Gamble & Martin Weiss	January 21, 2003	116, SC R-145	11.29
16	16	"Come and Knock on Our Door"	James Widdoes	Bill Callahan & Philip Wen	January 28, 2003	117, SC R-146	11.38
17	17	"Drummer Boy (Part 1)"	James Widdoes	Bill Daly	February 4, 2003	118, SC R-147	11.54
18	18	"Drummer Boy (Part 2)"	James Widdoes	Janis Hirsch	February 11, 2003	119, SC R-148	10.66
19	19	"Cool Parent"	James Widdoes	Paul Ciancarelli & David DiPietro	February 18, 2003	120, SC R-149	10.66
20	20	"Every Picture Tells a Story"	Mark Cendrowski	David Flebotte	February 25, 2003	121, SC R-151	9.98
21	21	"Kerry's Video"	Terry Hughes	Bonnie Kallman	March 11, 2003	115, SC R-144	9.93
22	22	"Good Moms Gone Wild"	James Widdoes	Bill Callahan & Philip Wen	March 25, 2003	124, SC R-153	10.26
23	23	"Career Woman"	Mark Cendrowski	Rosalind Moore	March 28, 2003	122, SC R-152	7.91
24	24	"Queen Bees and King Bees"	James Widdoes	Martin Weiss	April 8, 2003	123, SC R-152	8.38
25	25	"Bake Sale"	James Widdoes	Kim Friese	April 29, 2003	125, SC R-155	8.23
26	26	"The Doyle Wedding"	Lynn McCracken	Rosalind Moore	May 6, 2003	128, SC R-158	7.63
27	27	"Sort of an Officer and a Gentleman (Part 1)"	James Widdoes	Heather MacGillvray & Linda Mathious	May 13, 2003	126, SC R-156	7.45
28	28	"Sort of an Officer and a Gentleman (Part 2)"	James Widdoes	Janis Hirsch & Bonnie Kallman	May 20, 2003	127, SC R-157	7.88

=== Season 2 (2003–04) ===
No. overall	No. in season	Title	Directed by	Written by	Original release date	Prod. code	U.S. viewers (millions)
29	1	"Premiere"	James Widdoes	Tracy Gamble	September 23, 2003	203	16.97
Bridget finds her popularity waning because of her exclusive, long distance relationship with Donny, while Kerry's social status skyrockets because of her relationship with Kyle. But Bridget's eyes begin to stray when she meets Damien (Paul Wesley) — a sexy new boy at school. Meanwhile, as she waits for the results of her pregnancy test, Cate is stunned and angry when Paul, Bridget, Kerry and Rory seem more concerned about how the baby could disrupt their lives than the blessed event itself. In fact, the only support Cate seems to be getting is from her nosy neighbors, the Doyles, who share a well-kept secret about their own family — namely, all their children are adopted.
30	2	"Sex Ed"	Robby Benson	Gayle Abrams	September 30, 2003	201	15.51
Cate teaches sex education at Bridget's school and gets suspicious when she reads a submission where a girl's older boyfriend was coming from Maryland and she felt pressured to have sex. Bridget tries to cover it up by saying that this was a girl from Maryland, Lara O'Neal (which turned out to be made-up; Bridget herself was the one who wrote the question). Meanwhile, Paul is worried about Kerry after they saw a French movie with a sex scene in it.
31	3	"Donny Goes AWOL"	Robby Benson	Seth Kurland	October 7, 2003	202	17.72
The Doyles are sending a video postcard to Donny, which they let Bridget have a part in. However, Bridget breaks up with Donny on the video, which leads to a feud between the Hennessys and the Doyles. Upset, Donny hitchhikes all the way to the Hennessys in the back of a pig truck to win Bridget back; however, Bridget has still not broken up with her other boyfriend, Damien. Meanwhile, there are reports of eggings and toilet-paperings all over the neighborhood. Paul tries to come up with names for this menace, unaware that the criminal is Rory. Note: This episode was dedicated to John Ritter, who died a month earlier. Various clips of his past two years on the show are shown, ending with the message John Ritter (1948-2003). We will never forget you.
32	4	"Goodbye"	James Widdoes	David Flebotte & Martin Weiss	November 4, 2003	204	20.51
33	5	"Goodbye"	James Widdoes	Tracy Gamble & Bonnie Kallman	November 4, 2003	205	20.51
Cate receives a troubling phone call that causes her to run out of the house in tears, leaving the kids to wonder what is going on. It's soon revealed that Paul collapsed and died in the grocery store, leaving the family heartbroken. Later that evening, Cate's separated parents Jim and Laura arrive to help them through their grief. Bridget is wracked with guilt over the last words she ever said to her dad (which were "I hate you") and Kerry tries to ease her guilt. Cate is afraid of sleeping alone in her bed. Friends and neighbors gather at the Hennessys' for Paul's wake, where Nick Sharpe asks Cate to find the last article Paul wrote so the newspaper can publish it in his memory. When Kerry asks Rory why his hand is bandaged, he says he burned it on a casserole dish while taking it out of the oven; he later confesses to Jim that he punched a hole in his wall out of anger. The next day, Jim finds Paul's last article and Cate reads it to the kids: it is an article about how no matter how much his kids may resent him from time to time, Paul knows that deep down they love him, even when they say "I hate you;" this helps Bridget finally overcome her guilt. Cate and the kids rely on the message Paul is sending them: no matter what happens, family bonds are never broken.
34	6	"No Right Way"	James Widdoes	Gayle Abrams	November 11, 2003	206	11.61
Two weeks have passed since Paul died, and the kids begin to get special treatment when they return to school. While Kerry decides to lay low, Bridget tries to move on like it never happened.
35	7	"What Dad Would Want"	James Widdoes	Bill Daly	November 18, 2003	207	10.99
Cate sees that Rory is now hesitant to try out for the basketball team because Paul had been helping him practice. Cate tells him that his father wouldn't have wanted him to quit. The newspaper Paul worked at is sponsoring a scholarship dinner in his name for students majoring in journalism, and Bridget gets distracted while watching television, and accidentally wrecks a collage that Kerry had made of Paul for the dinner. When it's announced at the party that Rory made the team, Rory angrily storms out. Cate later finds out that Rory didn't make the team and when Rory comes home, he says he only said it because he was embarrassed that he let down his dad. But he's happy when Cate tells him because the coach was impressed at his request to work out with the team, he's now officially on it.
36	8	"The First Thanksgiving"	James Widdoes	Bonnie Kallman	November 25, 2003	208	11.65
It's the first Thanksgiving without Paul. Cate's mother visits, and manages to get along well with Jim. Bridget and Kerry plan to sneak out to a party instead of staying with the family. Rory feels that, now he's the man of the house, it's his job to assume Paul's role of being against every guy his sisters date, not to mention the carver of the turkey — which he does with clumsiness, inexperience and a lot of humor, which in the end helps the family to make it through the first of many milestones without Paul.
37	9	"The Story of Anne Frank and Skeevy"	James Widdoes	Tracy Gamble & Bonnie Kallman	December 23, 2003	209	9.43
Bridget plays the role of Anne Frank in the school play, which makes Kerry jealous, since all she does is background work. At first, Bridget is the same non-serious girl, which frustrates Kerry even more since she feels Bridget doesn't deserve the role. Cate sees this too, so she gives Bridget The Diary of a Young Girl, because she thinks it might help her, which it does – Bridget suddenly becomes a serious, focused girl and gets a better understanding of the role she is going to play. Rory gets a ventriloquist dummy he names Skeevy and uses it to constantly make fun of other people. Cate, Jim, and Rory attend the play and Bridget's performance is excellent. When they get home, Kerry tells Bridget she's proud of her. Cate is too and wonders how Bridget did it and tells her she tapped into some very serious emotion. The episode ends with Bridget staying behind downstairs after everyone goes to bed. She puts a red rose on Paul's desk in front of a picture of him and whispers, "Good night" before going upstairs.
38	10	"YMCA"	James Widdoes	Donald Beck & Bonnie Kallman	January 6, 2004	210	11.59
Bridget gets a job as a lifeguard at the local YMCA, which prompts Cate to enroll the whole family (to Bridget's chagrin). However, Kerry is unimpressed with a group of young blonde girls who idolize Bridget, while Jim punches another man for making comments about Bridget. Elsewhere Rory has an unexpected pubescent experience in a yoga class. Note: This is the first appearance of David Spade as C.J.
39	11	"Get Real"	James Widdoes	Seth Kurland & Ric Swartzlander	January 13, 2004	211	10.61
Cate's nephew C.J. stops by the Hennessy household to pay his final respects to Paul. C.J., however, can't resist getting into trouble when he gives Rory advice about kissing a girl, which lands him in detention, and then takes the blame when Kerry, while driving with just a learner's permit, dents Cate's car while driving Bridget on an errand.
40	12	"Consequences"	James Widdoes	Bill Callahan	January 27, 2004	212	9.09
Rory steals a police dog when he hears about C.J.'s glory days of stealing his old school mascot, but Cate is shocked when the dog finds marijuana in Kerry's backpack. Cate thinks Kerry's using drugs because of her father's death, but it's really just teenage rebellion. Meanwhile, Bridget gets brought home by the police for not wearing a helmet on her boyfriend's motorcycle after Cate telling her she has to.
41	13	"Opposites Attract (Part 1)"	James Widdoes	Gayle Abrams	February 10, 2004	213	7.74
In a Valentine's Day special, Bridget is forced to partner with geeky Jeremy (Jonathan Taylor Thomas) in Science class, and ends up falling for him. Meanwhile Kyle decides to take Kerry's stance against a commercialized Valentine's Day, only for him to surprise her with a romantic gift she wasn't expecting.
42	14	"Opposites Attract (Part 2)"	James Widdoes	Paul Ciancarelli & David DiPietro	February 17, 2004	214	8.30
Bridget decides to make a move on Jeremy by going to a 'geek party' with Kerry, only to discover that Jeremy has his eyes on someone else. C.J's van catches on fire, while Jim moves out of Rory's room.
43	15	"Opposites Attract: Night of the Locust (Part 3)"	James Widdoes	Bill Callahan & Bill Daly	February 24, 2004	215	8.00
After being told that she's fickle when it comes to relationships, Bridget is afraid that she may end up hurting Jeremy's feelings when her ex-bad boy boyfriend, Damian, returns to town. Meanwhile, Kerry is outraged and plans revenge when "provocative" dancing has been banned from the high school formal, which is being chaperoned by Cate and Jim; C.J. partners with Rory to broadcast school scandals over the Internet, and Jim falls for Ms. McKenna (Tatum O'Neal), a member of the high school's PTA committee.
44	16	"Daddy's Girl"	James Widdoes	Dave Flebotte & Tracy Gamble	March 2, 2004	216	8.07
The family therapist (Peter Bogdanovich) encourages Cate to pursue her dream of becoming a singer (her "skydiving", as the therapist puts it). In turn, Cate encourages C.J. to end his feud with Jim, so he takes him to the bar where Cate is singing. Bridget accidentally dyes Kerry's hair blonde. Katey Sagal (Cate) performs the song "Daddy's Girl" from her 2004 album "Room".
45	17	"Mall in the Family"	James Widdoes	Tamiko K. Brooks & Christy Jacobs White	March 16, 2004	219	7.77
Kerry gets a job at an embarrassing fast food restaurant at the mall to make money for her trip to Europe. Grandpa wants to pay his fair share at Cate's house and also gets a job there. However, Kerry might have to fire her grandfather for treating customers with disdain at the fast food restaurant. C.J. has a job as a security consultant at the mall, and he takes it very seriously. He then busts Bridget for going into the wrong movie theatre at the mall, interrogates her and tries to ban her from the mall (which he can't do). His supervisor (Inny Clemons) tells him that all he had to do was charge Bridget admission and let her go. Rory sells items on the Internet, but Cate gets angry when he sells too much.
46	18	"Let's Keep Going (Part 1)"	James Widdoes	Martin Weiss	March 30, 2004	217	7.59
After Bridget, Kerry and Rory vote against going on vacation to the cabin at the lake, Cate orders Bridget and Kerry to fly out to visit Grandma Laura in Sarasota instead of attending the Maeve Festival, believing the festival to contain "sex, drugs, and rock and roll". However, on their way to the airport in Kyle's car, the girls spot Cate hugging a mysterious stranger at their dad's favorite bar. Meanwhile, Rory, even though he is dating Missy Kleinfeld, develops an interest in Rachel Sharpe.
47	19	"Let's Keep Going (Part 2)"	James Widdoes	Martin Weiss	April 6, 2004	218	6.25
Upset and confused over their mother's behaviour, Bridget and Kerry decide not to go to their grandma's, and instead take a road trip to sort out their feelings. Along the way, they pick up C.J., who has been attacked by a group of women at the Maeve Festival. Then, when they think they are lost, they realize that they have arrived at the cabin at the lake, a place Paul loved. Later, Cate, Jim, Rory, and Kyle meet up with them, and Cate tells them that the last time they were there, Paul tried carving the name Hennessey on a wall behind a picture, before giving up when he cut his thumb. Cate removes the picture and everyone is amazed but sad when they see "HI" carved into the wall.
48	20	"C.J.'s Party"	James Widdoes	Paul Ciancarelli & David DiPietro	April 20, 2004	220	6.76
Cate banishes C.J. and grounds Bridget for going to C.J.'s college keg party. Jim has to take a written drivers exam after being pulled over with an expired license. As Kerry is getting a license too, Grandpa tries to cheat off her, with unexpected results.
49	21	"Mother's Day"	Pat Doak	Grant Nieporte & Robert Spina	May 4, 2004	221	6.64
Bridget and Kerry are up to something, and Cate is determined to find out what. She discovers that they were planning to send her away for a Mother's Day spa weekend, only to realise they were planning to throw a party while she was gone. Meanwhile, Rory sets up a Car Wash.
50	22	"The Principal"	Lynn McCracken	Seth Kurland	May 11, 2004	224	6.49
Bridget gets in trouble at school, prompting a meeting between Cate and Principal Gibb (Adam Arkin) who turns out to be an old schoolmate.
51	23	"Finalé Part Un (Part 1)"	James Widdoes	Bonnie Kallman & Martin Weiss	May 18, 2004	222	7.54
52	24	"Finalé Part Deux (Part 2)"	James Widdoes	Bill Callahan & Bill Daly	May 18, 2004	223	7.54
After forgetting to hand in a form for Kerry's trip to Europe, Cate is forced to deal with Principal Gibb again. Elsewhere, Cate also has to deal with Jim's relationship with Tina (Connie Stevens), who owns the bar where Cate sang "Daddy's Girl". Kerry organizes a sit-in to protest at frog dissection in school, and Bridget takes the blame so that Kerry will still be able to go on her trip to Europe in the summer. As a result, Bridget is elected student body president. Meanwhile Jim plans a summer road trip with Rory to Florida, where he hopes to win back his wife; C.J. deludes himself into believing that Steven Tyler wants him to be Aerosmith's roadie; this turns out to be true, but C.J., after Rory expresses his excitement about C.J.'s joining them, passes it up and joins Rory and Jim on their trip instead.

=== Season 3 (2004–05) ===
No. overall	No. in season	Title	Directed by	Written by	Original release date	Prod. code	U.S. viewers (millions)
53	1	"First Day of School"	James Widdoes	Kathy Ann Stumpe	September 24, 2004	302	6.11
Kerry continues to delay breaking up with Kyle, so Bridget does it for her – only for Kerry to realize she doesn't want to break up with him after all. Meanwhile, Cate is offered the position of a school nurse, and Rory's first day of high school is awkward when he has to hit the showers after gym.
54	2	"Changes"	James Widdoes	Seth Kurland	October 1, 2004	301	6.33
Originally intended to be the season premiere, it was aired as the second episode after a mix-up with production codes/dates. The kids are suspicious of Cate after she changes her hairstyle and her bedroom while they were away during the summer. Rory tries to help Jim quit smoking. Kerry confides in C.J and Bridget that she lost her virginity to a guy named Bruno on her Europe vacation.
55	3	"The School Nurse"	James Widdoes	Rob Hanning	October 8, 2004	303	5.98
After Cate accepts the position of school nurse, Bridget and Kerry are convinced that she only took the job to spy on them. Rory, however, is ecstatic that his mother might be able to protect him from the school bully. When Cate starts yelling at Bridget for getting a tattoo and why she can't be good like Kerry, Bridget accidentally blurts out Kerry's secret (the loss of her virginity) which a horrified Cate accidentally reveals to the whole school via PA.
56	4	"Out of the Box"	James Widdoes	Martin Weiss	October 15, 2004	304	5.94
Kerry is livid when Bridget unintentionally makes a mockery out of her art project at the mall. But she quickly forgets about Bridget when fellow artist and young hottie Tyler asks her out on a date. However Tyler's intentions may not be completely genuine. Meanwhile, while C.J. finds himself striking out at speed dating, Jim discovers that he's a hit with the ladies-which further humiliates his socially inept grandson.
57	5	"Car Trouble"	James Widdoes	Hayes Jackson	October 22, 2004	305	6.38
Bridget and Kerry are very excited when Cate gives them keys to the minivan, with a single provision: They must drive Rory wherever he needs to go. But when the girls refuse to fulfill their promise, Rory decides to take matters into his own hands, and makes an attempt to drive himself to impress a girl named Marni (Tiffany Thornton) that he likes, and in the process wrecks the car.
58	6	"Halloween"	Lynn McCracken	Steve Baldikoski & Bryan Behar	October 29, 2004	306	7.41
Kerry doesn't feel that Bridget has the ability to put together the school's Halloween party as part of her duty as the Student Body President. Bridget has a mix-up and kisses the jealous vice-president instead of her crush, Pete. C.J. is hired as the security guard for the party and sets his eyes on catching Rory pulling off a prank by blowing up the giant pumpkin. Instead, when he catches Rory, Rory calls up the costumed Village People, bringing back C.J.'s bad memories. Jim finds himself being attacked by neighborhood kids when he refuses to give candy out to trick-or-treaters.
59	7	"Coach" "Tennis Coach"	James Widdoes	Laurie Gelman	November 5, 2004	307	6.86
Bridget is in love with new tennis coach, so she joins the tennis team to get his attention. She also makes him a tennis racket cover using Cate's favourite sweater. However, the coach actually has a secret crush on the school nurse, Cate.
60	8	"Secrets"	James Widdoes	Bonnie Kallman	November 12, 2004	308	7.77
It seems everyone in the Hennessy household is keeping secrets – Rory refuses to tell who hit him, Bridget and Kerry use fake ID's to get into a nightclub and while waiting in line, Bridget meets a cute guy (Shawn) who turns out to be a cop who she gave her number to, the coach who likes Cate whom Bridget likes keeps trying to get Cate to agree to go on a date with him, and C.J while asked to buy Rory's medication instead goes to a bar and gives him candy for medicine but C.J is expecting the pharmacist to call. Now all they have to do is get to the phone first, but it ends with Bridget finding out about Cate and the coach, and the cop arriving and C.J is left humiliated.
61	9	"Thanksgiving Guest" "Thanksgiving"	James Widdoes	Story by : Dena Waxman; Teleplay by : Tamiko K. Brooks & Rob Hanning	November 26, 2004	310	7.09
After the garage is burned down, due to a turkey fryer explosion, Cate recalls yesterday's Thanksgiving celebrations, which involved the kids trying to prepare everything to give Cate a break, Jim attempting to fix the TV and Cate bringing home Principal Gibb.
62	10	"Vanity Unfair"	James Widdoes	Paul Ciancarelli & David DiPietro	December 3, 2004	309	6.71
After Bridget is turned down for a role in a sports car commercial, Jim discovers that the head of the modeling agency who rejected her is his old flame Jackie (Raquel Welch). When he tries to persuade her to reconsider his granddaughter, Jim soon finds himself reminiscing over old times – and possibly rekindling their romance. Meanwhile, Kerry and Rory discover a secret about C.J.'s past modeling experiences.
63	11	"Princetown Girl"	James Widdoes	Tamiko K. Brooks	December 10, 2004	311	5.88
Kerry is stunned to discover that Bridget may be getting a tennis scholarship at Princeton University. However, failing grades prevent her being able to play, so Cate wonders if she should use her power as school nurse to help.
64	12	"A Very C.J. Christmas" "A Very Cool Christmas"	James Widdoes	Kathy Ann Stumpe	December 17, 2004	312	7.09
C.J. goes to Las Vegas for Christmas rather than spend time with the family even though they spent a lot of time and effort making Christmas special for him.
65	13	"The Sub"	James Widdoes	Steve Baldikoski & Bryan Behar	January 7, 2005	313	7.82
Principal Gibb hires C.J. as a substitute teacher. Everything goes well until C.J. catches Rory cheating on a test, and he wrestles with his conscience over whether or not to tell Principal Gibb.
66	14	"C.J.'s Temptation"	James Widdoes	Steve Baldikoski & Bryan Behar	January 7, 2005	314	8.39
Cate finds herself becoming jealous of Principal Gibb's new girlfriend Cheryl, while C.J. attempts to tutor her – and unwittingly becomes the object of her affections. Rory discovers "self pleasure". And his pants are caught down… literally.
67	15	"Old Flame"	James Widdoes	John Peaslee & Judd Pillot	January 14, 2005	315	8.43
When Cate sends an email to her former college flame Matt (played by Katey Sagal's Married... with Children co-star, Ed O'Neill) to see how he has been over the years since college, she becomes fed up with her family's unreasonable demands, and locks herself in her room for some alone time. But she is shocked when Matt shows up at her window and whisks her off to re-live adventurous, old times. However, Cate soon begins to question if his rebel lifestyle is being used as a front.
68	16	"Closure"	James Widdoes	Seth Kurland	January 21, 2005	316	7.49
C.J. and Cate have found out that Kerry has been emailing to Bruno (Kyle Howard), the boy she met in Europe. They meet in Cate's attic and they get back together while C.J. and Cate have been reading Kerry's emails and print them out. Meanwhile, Jim plays poker with Rory and his friends.
69	17	"Volleybrawl"	Barnet Kellman	Hayes Jackson	January 28, 2005	317	7.89
Cate's alleged antics at Kerry's volleyball game threaten to make her team forfeit the match. Meanwhile, C.J. has a crush on Kerry's volleyball coach (former pro beach volleyball player Gabrielle Reece), and Bridget becomes upset when one of her friends begins dating her ex-boyfriend.
70	18	"Freaky Friday"	James Widdoes	W. Bruce Cameron	February 4, 2005	318	8.30
Cate watches Freaky Friday, then falls asleep, dreaming the family wake up in different bodies: Bridget swaps with Cate, C.J. swaps with Grandpa and Rory swaps with his hamster. Kerry is still herself. Grandpa in C.J.'s body tries to hit on the older school examiner while C.J. in Grandpa must tell war stories to the class. Bridget in Cate's body flubs the nurse test and Cate in Bridget makes Bridget go to prom with a dork.
71	19	"Torn Between Two Lovers"	James Widdoes	John Peaslee & Judd Pillot	February 11, 2005	319	7.54
C.J. finds himself in a bad situation – he's committed himself to two different dates: Cheryl, Principal Gibb's ex-girlfriend, and Bridget and Kerry's high school math teacher, Mrs. Krupp. Meanwhile, Bridget's excitement about being elected to the court of the Valentine's dance and being given a chance to be crowned Queen of Hearts quickly becomes shock when she discovers that Cheryl is also running in the competition.
72	20	"C.J.'s Real Dad"	James Widdoes	Rob Hanning	February 18, 2005	320	8.04
C.J. is offered a job as a full-time teacher, which he really wants, but when his biological father comes to town he convinces C.J. to assist him in a new book telling about how they came together after being apart for years. Meanwhile, Kerry is upset when Bridget accidentally wins an MP3 player from a radio contest.
73	21	"The After Party"	Patricia Doak	Grant Nieporte & Robert Spina	March 4, 2005	322	6.91
Prom night is around the corner, and Bridget wants to throw a safe after-prom party in a hotel. Cate tells her no, but later, C.J. tells her if there isn't a place to party, the kids will find one. So, Cate decides to throw the after party at the house, which humiliates Rory, Kerry and Bridget. During the after-party, Bridget sneaks out to the hotel to throw her after party. C.J. tracks her down, but ends up getting tied up on top of a TV in a hotel room. Meanwhile, Kerry has written an article about gay couples going to the prom. A girl named Monica (Vanessa Lengies) asks Kerry to be her prom date, so they can "turn a few heads for the cause", but Kerry starts to get the impression that Monica really likes her as a girlfriend. It also turns out that Rory's prom date, Nicky Alcott (Leighton Meester), is gay, which disappoints Rory.
74	22	"The Teachers' Lounge"	James Widdoes	Paul Ciancarelli & David DiPietro	April 1, 2005	323	6.12
C.J. gets a job as a full-time teacher, and he is excited as he now has access to the teachers' lounge. But one of the teachers, Mr. Edwards, is bullying him, to the point where he kicks C.J. out of the lounge, so Cate helps him with his problem. Meanwhile, Kerry and Bridget give Rory a makeover so he can impress a girl named 'Hot Megan'.
75	23	"The Sleepover"	James Widdoes	John Peaslee & Judd Pillot	April 8, 2005	321	5.94
After Principal Gibb and Cate fall asleep at the house while watching a movie, the family catches them and falsely assumes that the two are having a relationship. Meanwhile, Bridget, Kerry, Rory and C.J. are forced to go ice-fishing with Jim in order to spend quality time with their grandfather – but unbeknownst to them, Jim would much rather be left alone and is forced to keep up a happy facade.
76	24	"Ditch Day"	James Widdoes	Jeremiah Leibowitz	April 15, 2005	324	5.26
After C.J. discovers that Cate may be starting a clandestine relationship with Principal Gibb, he blabs it to Bridget. An angry Cate gets even by having Gibb put C.J. in charge of the detention of students on Ditch Day, and C.J. gets even by detaining Bridget. Meanwhile, because she is stuck in detention and can't complete the ditch day prank herself, Bridget convinces Kerry and Rory to steal the rival school's mascot.
