= Headless Horseman (film) =

- Genre: Horror
- Based on: Headless Horseman; The Legend of Sleepy Hollow
- Screenplay by: Zachary Weintraub; Anthony C. Ferrante
- Story by: Ken Badish; Zachary Weintraub
- Directed by: Anthony C. Ferrante
- Starring: Billy Aaron Brown; Rebecca Mozo; Arianne Fraser; M. Steven Felty; Trish Coren; Elizabeth Prestel; Brent Lydic; Joe Hartzler; Richard Moll
- Music by: Alan Howarth
- Country of origin: United States
- Original language: English

Production
- Executive producers: Thomas P. Vitale; Ken Badish; Paul Laurens
- Cinematography: David Worth
- Editor: Christopher Roth
- Running time: 92 minutes
- Production companies: Nu Image; Active Entertainment

Original release
- Network: Sci Fi Channel
- Release: October 20, 2007

Headless Horseman is a 2007 American horror television film that aired on the Sci Fi Channel on October 27, 2007, based on the legend of the Headless Horseman. It stars Richard Moll and Billy Aaron Brown and is directed by Anthony C. Ferrante.

== Plot ==
All Hallow’s Eve, 1862: Two Confederate soldiers, the last of their company, are being hunted in the woods outside Wormwood Ridge. They attempt to defend themselves as the Headless Horseman emerges from the woods and decapitates them.

Halloween, Present Day: Seven teenage friends; Seth, his girlfriend Tiffany, Lizzie, her boyfriend Doc, Nash, Ava, and Liam are driving through eastern Kansas to a party when they stop for gas and directions. Seth finds a “shortcut” through some backroads, but drives over an open bear trap, which destroys the car’s wheel. A young, female tow truck driver named Candy “happens upon” them and takes them to Wormwood Ridge, a town so small it does not appear on the map.

Candy drops their van off at her father, “Pa” Rusk’s garage/junkyard to be repaired and gives the others a tour of the town, which is preparing for the Headless Horseman Celebration, an annual event held every Halloween in Wormwood Ridge since 1806, the year the Horseman began stalking the area for heads according to legend. Seth and Ava go check on the van and discover it missing. Seth searches the junkyard for Pa Rusk when a headless figure emerges, decapitates him, and leaves with his severed head. When Seth does not return, Ava searches the junkyard and finds his body, then alerts the others. Candy reveals the history of “Headless”, or Calvin Montgomery, a 19th-century serial killer who preyed on the children of Wormwood until the residents finally caught and hanged him in the town square, leaving him to rot until his body tore away from his head. Since then, Montgomery’s spirit rises every 7 years on Halloween to collect 7 youths’ heads. Candy warns them that they must leave before Headless returns to claim his next head.

The group attempts an escape into the forest on foot but a supernatural mist envelops them and Headless appears on horseback, scattering the group. In the confusion, Tiffany is decapitated and Headless collects her head, then disappears. The others hear church bells nearby and realize they are walking in circles, now back at Wormwood. The group splits up: Liam and Lizzie search for a working vehicle and Nash, Doc, and Ava search the town for weapons. The trio steals several guns from Kolchak Stillwall’s general store, but Headless appears and decapitates Doc, stealing his head. As Lizzie and Liam are searching the garage, they are attacked by Pa Rusk but Liam overpowers him. The four reunite at Kolchak’s but soon split again, with Lizzie and Nash work to get a car working while Ava and Liam search the town’s library for clues as to how to defeat Headless. Nash fixes a car and the four escape the town and are about to cross the bridge over the river when Headless appears and decapitates Nash, causing the car to crash. Pa Rusk shows up and forces Liam, Ava, and Lizzie back into town at gunpoint, where he ties them up for Headless.

When Pa Rusk leaves, Candy unties the remaining three, revealing she is not originally from the town and wishes to escape with the others. She tells them that if Headless does not get his 7 heads, he and all of Wormwood will cease to exist entirely. Liam is able to call 911 and a patrol car is sent out to search the area but the inhabitants of Wormwood kill the officer as Headless appears and decapitates Lizzie. Candy steals Pa Rusk’s tow truck, running him down with it in the process. Liam and Ava lure Headless to the bridge out of town in an effort to destroy him because he cannot cross running water. Candy drives up in the tow truck and using the tow’s cable, Ava and Liam hook Headless then pull him onto the bridge where he simultaneously bursts into flames and melts, causing the bridge to catch fire. Wormwood, the buildings and all the people turn to dust and blow away leaving only Candy, Liam, and Ava alive as the bridge to Wormwood burns.

== Cast ==
=== Main ===
- Billy Aaron Brown as Liam
- Rebecca Mozo as Ava
- Elvin Dandel as Seth
- Trish Coren as Lizzie
- Brent Lydic as Nash
- Joe Hartzler as Doc
- Arianne Fraser as Tiffany
- Elizabeth Prestel as Candy
- M. Steven Felty as Pa Rusk / Sgt. Mosby Rusk
- Richard Moll as Kolchak Jefferson Stillwall
- Vasile Albinet as Headless / Calvin Montgomery

=== Supporting ===
- Richard Caluda as Johnny Rusk
- Greg Atkins as Sheriff Steve Buck
- Dan Mason as Sheriff Otis
- Alin Contantinescu as David
- Catherine Felty as Dispatcher
- Pavlic Nemes as Walking Man
- Nicolae Badila as Rag Doll man
- Tudor Stroiescu as Johnny's Gang
- Stelian Strepici as Johnny's Gang
- Ana Maria Arsenic as Johnny's Gang

=== Wormwood Townfolk ===
- Elena Barabovschi
- Gabriel Carbunaru
- Iuliana Catalinoiu
- Augustina Cojocaru
- Francisc Deac
- Ionita Gabriel
- Ana Predniceanu
- Vasile Rachieru
- Emanuel Stefancu
- Enache Tudorita
- Loredana Vilcan

== Production ==
Filming took place in Romania in association with Castel Film Romania.

== Release ==
Headless Horseman premiered at the 2007 Screamfest Horror Film Festival on October 20, 2007. It also screened at the Pioneer Theater in New York City on October 22, 2007 before seeing a North American premier on the Sci Fi Channel as a Saturday night original movie on October 27, 2007. It was released on DVD by First Look Studios in 2008.

== See also ==
- List of films set around Halloween
