= Billy Aaron Brown =

American actor

- Born: Iowa, U.S.
- Occupation: Actor
- Years active: 2000–present
- Known for: 8 Simple Rules; Jeepers Creepers 2

Billy Aaron Brown is an American actor. He is best known for playing the character Kyle on the sitcom 8 Simple Rules and he is also known for his role in Jeepers Creepers 2 (2003).

== Early life and education ==
Brown was born in Iowa. He attended Clarinda High School, and moved to Los Angeles to become an actor at eighteen just after graduating.

== Career ==
A year after moving to Los Angeles, Brown guest starred on the MTV show Undressed. In 2001, he made appearances on the Fox drama Boston Public in two episodes. He then made his first of four appearances alongside Mary-Kate and Ashley Olsen in the film Holiday in the Sun, which also starred Megan Fox and Brown's good friend Ben Easter. In 2002, Brown got his big break playing Kyle in the ABC sitcom 8 Simple Rules alongside John Ritter, Katey Sagal, and Kaley Cuoco. Brown has more recently appeared in Headless Horseman, The Strip and Detention.

== Personal life ==
Brown is a supporter of the Huntington's Disease Society of America as it has affected his family. He has a walk/run in Los Angeles to raise money for the Huntington's Disease Society of America every autumn.

He appeared on the TV show Street Smarts, where he went under the name Aaron Brown. At the end of the show he won $3800.

== Filmography ==
Key
†	Denotes films that have not yet been released

=== Film ===
Year	Title	Role	Notes
2001	Holiday in the Sun	Scott	Direct-to-video
2002	Getting There	Danny	Direct-to-video
2003	Jeepers Creepers 2	Andy 'Bucky' Buck	
2004	Going to the Mat	John Lambrix	TV movie
2004	Snackers	Matty Livingston	Short
2004	Searching for David's Heart	David Deeton	TV movie
2005	Attack of the Sabretooth	Kirk	TV movie
2006	Deception	Billy	Short
2006	These Days	Jeremy	
2007	First Night	John	Short
2007	The Strip	Jeff	
2010	Detention	Jack	
2012	After Christmas	Cole	Short
2014	Almost aWake		Short
2016	Halfway	Sean	
2017	Limerence	Leo	
TBA	Seed of Doubt †	Kevin	Completed
TBA	Enough Room †	Patron #1	Post-production

=== Television ===
Year	Title	Role	Notes
2000	Undressed	Billy	Season 3 (recurring, 5 episodes)
2001	Boston Public	Leo Peterson	Season 1, episodes 16 & 19 (guest)
2002	So Little Time	Rob	Season 1, episode 18 (guest)
2002	First Monday	Chad Davidson	Season 1, episode 10 (guest)
2002–2004	8 Simple Rules	Kyle	Seasons 1–3 (recurring, 31 episodes)
2002	Touched by an Angel	Ben Everett	Season 9, episode 7 (guest)
2005	NCIS	Danny Potter	Season 2, episode 20 (guest)
2007	Ghost Whisperer	Curt Kouf	Season 2, episode 15 (guest)
2008	Imaginary Bitches	Ben	Season 1, episode 13 (guest)
2012	Underemployed	Ike	Season 1, episodes 9 & 10 (guest)
2013	CSI: Crime Scene Investigation	Owen Webber	Season 13, episode 21 (guest)
2014	Chicago P.D.	Michael Ganz	Season 1, episode 3 (guest)
2015	Mike & Molly	Shia	Season 5, episode 18 (guest)
2017	Easy Abby		Season 2, episode 5
