= Nikki Danielle Moore =

American actress

- Other names: Nikki Hayden, Nikki D. Hayden, Nicole Hayden, Nikki Marie Bloss
- Occupation: Actress
- Years active: 2002–present
- Spouse: Jay Hayden (m. 2005; div. 2020)
- Children: 2

Nikki Danielle Moore, also known as Nicole Hayden, and Nikki Marie Bloss is an American actress. She is best known for her role as Jenna Sharpe on the television sitcom 8 Simple Rules.

== Career ==
Her first on-screen appearance was a small role as Ally in an episode of the comedy television series Even Stevens. In 2004, she joined the cast of the ABC show 8 Simple Rules, playing Jenna Sharpe. In 2010, she became somewhat of an Internet sensation after appearing as "Denise" in Taco Bell commercials. She had guest roles on the television shows C.S.I. (2002), How I Met Your Mother (2011), Mad Men (2013) and 90210 (2013). She had a lead role as Emily in romantic comedy film The Park Bench (2014). The film also earned her Jury Award for Best Actress in a Narrative Feature at Queens World Film Festival. She also appeared in episodes of Grey's Anatomy; Station 19; The Catch; Diary of a Wedding Planner; and One & Done.

She has been credited as Nikki Hayden, Nikki D. Hayden but is now known as Nicole Hayden. One reason she has changed her screen name various times is because the Screen Actors Guild only allows one individual to perform under one name, and there were conflicts with her previous screen names.

== Filmography ==
Film and television roles
Year	Title	Role	Notes
2002	Even Stevens	Ally	Episode: "Model Principal"
2002	C.S.I.	Debbie Reston	Episode: "The Execution of Catherine Willows"
2002–2004	8 Simple Rules	Jenna Sharpe	10 episodes
2005	Horror High	Corrie	
2007	The Grass Is Greener	Bailey	Television film
2007	Jekyll	Co-Ed #1	
2010–2011	Diary of a Wedding Planner	Rachel	3 episodes
2011	Life in Short	Miller Hamilton	Short film
2011	How I Met Your Mother	Jessica	Episode: "The Naked Truth"
2012	Blue-Eyed Butcher	Neighborhood Mom	Television film
2012	Claire	Claire	
2013	90210	Pregnant Woman	Episode: "A Portrait of the Artist as a Young Call Girl"
2013	Mad Men	Beverly Farber	Episode: "The Flood"
2014	The Park Bench	Emily	
2014	Grey's Anatomy	Kate Franklin	Episode: "Bend & Break"
2016	One & Done	Whitney	Episode: "Luke"
2016	It's Us	Universe Spray Friend	
2017	The Catch	Vikki	Episode: "The Dining Hall"
2017	Flock of Four	Kate Grover	
2017	Thirst	John's Wife	Short film
2018	Station 19	Allison	Episode: "Let It Burn"
2018	Healing Hands	Mariah Wilson	
