= Walter Perez (actor) =

Mexican-American actor (born 1982)

- Born: July 12, 1982 (age 44); South Gate, California, U.S.
- Education: California State University, Fullerton (BS)
- Occupations: Actor, musician
- Years active: 2001–present

Walter Perez (born July 12, 1982) is a Mexican-American film actor, television actor and musician. He is best known for his role in Fame. He had a recurring role as Richard Martinez/Leaper X in the first season of the NBC drama Quantum Leap (2022) and a role as Jorge Perez in the Paramount+ series Fatal Attraction (2023).

== Early life and education ==
Walter Perez was born in South Gate, California, and is of Mexican descent. He started performing when he was seven years old as a flamenco dancer in elementary school recitals. At a young age, Perez developed a passion for acting and joined Colors United, a performing arts group for inner-city high school students. Perez attended California State University, Fullerton, where he studied and earned a bachelor's degree in criminal justice.

== Career ==
Perez began his career in 2002. He has guest starred in The Closer, CSI: Crime Scene Investigation, CSI: Miami, A Beautiful Life, and had a five-episode role on Friday Night Lights. In 2010 he guest starred in Cold Case, NCIS: Los Angeles and In Plain Sight. He has been in many independent films, including August Evening. In August Evening he plays Luis, kind-hearted butcher who falls in love with the widow, Lupe. Walter starred in Emilio, another popular independent film. He also played Al Crisotomo in the television movie, Walkout on HBO; and co-starred alongside Dermot Mulroney and Diane Kruger in Run for Your Life. Perez is best known for his role in Fame, an updated version of the 1980 film.

Walter won Outstanding Performance for his role in August Evening at 2007 Los Angeles Film Festival in the independent film, August Evening, which won the John Cassavetes Award.

== Personal life ==
Perez enjoys playing piano, and different instruments after learning how to in Fame. He spends his downtime free riding in the Santa Monica Mountains. Walter Perez enjoying free riding with his closest friends.

== Filmography ==
=== Film ===
Year	Title	Role	Notes
2003	Rivals	Frito	
2006	Friends with Money	Construction Worker	Uncredited
2006	Big Bad Wolf	Fisher	
2007	The 7	Anthony Lopez	
2007	August Evening	Luis	
2008	Emilio	Emilio	
2008	A Beautiful Life	Enrico	
2009	Fame	Victor Tavares	
2010	Inhale	Arturo	
2011	Detention	Elliot Fink	
2011	Born to Race	Tony	Direct-to-DVD
2012	The Avengers	Young Shield Pilot	
2012	California Winter	Carlos Gonzalez	
2013	Mission Park	Jason	
2013	Sanitarium	Mateo	
2013	Pop Star	Frank Santos	
2013	Road to Juarez	Jacob Saenz	
2014	The Park Bench	Mateo	
2015	I Spit on Your Grave III: Vengeance Is Mine	Chief	
2015	Mix	Mateo	
2017	Bodied	Che Corleone	
2020	Heartland Cartel	Badger	Pre-production

=== Television ===
Year	Title	Role	Notes
2004	The District	Tico Rodriguez	3 episodes
2005	Judging Amy	Fernando 'Freddie' Duran	Episode: "Too Little, Too Late"
2006	Walkout	Al Crisostomo	HBO television film
2006	Friday Night Lights	Bobby 'Bull' Reyes	5 episodes
2007	CSI: Miami	Jorge Zamareno	Episode: "Throwing Heat"
2008	Free Radio	George	2 episodes
2008	The Closer	Oscar Sanchez	Episode: "Sudden Death"
2010	Cold Case	Carlos Espinosa	Episode: "Bombers"
2010	NCIS: Los Angeles	Omar Alvares	Episode: "Full Throttle"
2010	In Plain Sight	Leo Olarte	Episode: "Father Goes West"
2010	Grey's Anatomy	Russ Gammie	Episode: "Shock to the System"
2011	Off the Map	Roberto	Episode: "A Doctor Time Out"
2011	CHAOS	Felipe	Episode: "Móle"
2011	The Protector	Danny Casas	Episode: "Blood"
2011	Prime Suspect	Ward Foster	Episode: "Shame"
2012	The Pregnancy Project	Jorge	Television film
2012	The River	Soup	Episode: "Peaches"
2012	Castle	Bobby Lopez	Episode: "47 Seconds"
2012	Blackout	Biggs	Episode: "Part I"
2013	Hello Ladies	Lopez	Episode: "Long Beach"
2014	NCIS	Lt. Michael Waters	Episode: "Shooter"
2014	CSI: Crime Scene Investigation	Rudy Adela	Episode: "Bad Blood"
2016	Grimm	Benjamin McCullough	Episode: "The Believer"
2016	Broken	Rick Bream	Unaired pilot
2017	A Moving Romance	Pete	Television film
2018–2019	Queen Sugar	Romero	19 episodes
2020	9-1-1: Lone Star	Ben	Episode: "Monster Inside"
2022-2023	Quantum Leap	Richard Martinez/Leaper X	4 episodes
2023	Fatal Attraction	Jorge Perez	5 episodes
