= Jasmin (given name) =

Jasmin is a given name, a variant of Jasmine, and is the common form in Germany and Finland. In German, Finnish, and English-speaking countries it is feminine, whereas in Slovenia, Croatia, Bosnia and Herzegovina, Serbia, Montenegro, and Macedonia it is masculine - the feminine variant in these countries is Jasmina. There are other variations and ways of spelling this name, such as: Yasmin, Jasminko, etc. for the masculine variant, and Yasmina, Jasminka, etc. for the feminine.

== People named Jasmin ==
- Jasmin (Indian actress) (born 1968 or 1969), Indian actress who acted in a few Hindi films
- Jasmin Agić (born 1974), Croatian footballer
- Jasmin Agović (born 1991), Montenegrin footballer
- Jasmin Akter (born 2001), Rohingya cricketer
- Jasmin Bajwa (born 1996), Indian actress and model
- Jasmin Bašić (born 1971), Bosnian tenor and author
- Jasmin Bhasin (born 1990), Indian actress and model
- Jasmin Blanchette, German academic
- Jasmin Savoy Brown (born 1994), American actress
- Jasmin Bungay (born 1997), Filipino model and beauty pageant titleholder
- Jasmin Burić (born 1987), Bosnian goalkeeper
- Jasmin Čeliković (born 1999), Bosnian footballer
- Jasmin Coratti (born 2001), Italian snowboarder
- Jasmin Darznik (born 1973), Iranian–American writer
- Jasmin Dizdar (born 1961), British-Bosnian film director, screenwriter and author
- Jasmin Duehring (born 1992), German-Canadian cyclist
- Jasmin Džeko (born 1958), Bosnia and Herzegovina footballer
- Jasmin Emrić (born 1969), Bosnian politician
- Jasmin Farid (born 1992), Swedish politician
- Jasmin Fejzić (born 1986), Bosnian footballer
- Jasmin Figueroa (born 1985), Filipino archer
- Jasmin Forsyth, Australian presenter, journalist, writer, and producer
- Jasmin Freigang (born 1989), German politician
- Jasmin B. Frelih (born 1986), Slovenian writer, editor and translator
- Jasmin Gassmann (born 1989), German actress
- Jasmin Gerat (born 1978), German actress
- Jasmin Grabowski (born 1991), German judoka
- Jasmin Graham, American marine biologist
- Jasmin Hilliard (born 1998), Puerto Rican footballer
- Jasmin Hagendorfer, Austrian artist, festival organizer, and writer
- Jasmin Hamid (born 1984), Finnish actress and politician
- Jasmin Hasić (born 1988), Bosnian boxer
- Jasmin Handanović (born 1978), Slovenian goalkeeper
- Jasmin Holtermann (born 2000), Danish curler
- Jasmin Hukić (born 1979), Bosnian basketball player
- Jasmin Hurić (born 1972), Bosnia and Herzegovina footballer
- Jasmin Hutter (born 1978), Swiss politician
- Jasmin Imamović (born 1957), Bosnian politician and writer
- Jasmin Jüttner (born 1993), German karateka
- Jasmin Kähärä (born 2000), Finnish cross country skier
- Jasmin Khezri (born 1967), German-Iranian artist
- Jasmin Krejc (born 1992), Austrian footballer
- Jasmin Krohn (born 1966), Swedish speed skater
- Jasmin Kulenović (1957–1995), Bosnian army officer
- Jasmin Kurtić (born 1989), Slovenian professional footballer
- Jasmin Lau (born 1983), Singaporean politician
- Jasmin Liechti (born 2002), Swiss cyclist
- Jasmin Lord (born 1989), German actress and film director
- Jasmin Mansaray (born 2004), Finnish footballer
- Jasmin Mäntylä (born 1982), Finnish model and politician
- Jasmin Mecinovikj (born 1993), Macedonian footballer
- Jasmin Mešanović (born 1992), Bosnian professional footballer
- Jasmin Milić (born 1969), Croatian Anglican bishop
- Jasmin Moallem (born 1995), Israeli singer, songwriter, rapper and record producer
- Jasmin Moghbeli (born 1983), American pilot and NASA astronaut
- Jasmin Moranjkić (born 1983), Bosnian football manager
- Jasmin Mozaffari, Canadian film director and screenwriter
- Jasmin Mrkonja (born 1958), Yugoslav handball player
- Jasmin Mujdža (born 1974), Bosnia and Herzegovina footballer
- Jasmin Nejati (born 1994), Swedish footballer
- Jasmin Ouschan (born 1986), Austrian pool player
- Jasmin Pal (born 1996), Austrian footballer
- Jasmin Paris (born 1983), British runner
- Jasmin Perković (born 1980), Croatian basketball player
- Jasmin Pfeiler (born 1984), Austrian footballer
- Jasmin Raboshta (born 1990), Albanian footballer
- Jasmin Repeša (born 1961), Croatian basketball coach
- Jasmin Kent Rodgman, British-Malaysian composer
- Jasmin Rosenberger (born 1985), German-Turkish swimmer
- Jasmin Samardžić (born 1974), Croatian footballer
- Jasmin Santana, American politician
- Jasmin Schornberg (born 1986), German canoeist
- Jasmin Schreiber (born 1988), German biologist, science journalist, writer, photographer, and translator
- Jasmin Schwiers (born 1982), German actress
- Jasmin Šćuk (born 1990), Bosnian footballer
- Jasmin Sehan (born 1997), German footballer
- Jasmin Selberg (born 1998/1999), German beauty pageant titleholder
- Jasmin Shojai (born 1994), Australian model and actor
- Jasmin Shokrian, American artist and fashion designer
- Jasmin Sian (born 1969), Filipino-American artist
- Jasmin Siddiqui (born 1981), German artist
- Jasmin Singer (born 1979), American animal rights activist
- Jasmin Sokolović (born 1962), Bosnian musician and trumpeter
- Jasmin Spahić (born 1980), Bosnian footballer
- Jasmin St. Claire (born 1972), American pornographic actor and wrestler
- Jasmin Staiblin (born 1970), German manager
- Jasmin Stewart (born 1998), Australian rules footballer
- Jasmin Strachan (born 1978), Filipino taekwondo practitioner
- Jasmin Strange (born 2002), Australian rugby league footballer
- Jasmin Stavros (1954–2023), Croatian singer
- Jasmin Sudić (born 1990), Swedish footballer
- Jasmin Tabatabai (born 1967), German actress and singer
- Jasmin Taylor (born 1993), British telemark skier
- Jasmin Trtovac (born 1986), Serbian footballer
- Jasmin Vardimon (born 1971), Israeli-born, UK-based choreographer, dancer and artistic director
- Jasmin Wagner (born 1980), German pop singer, actress and model
- Jasmin Walia, British singer and television personality
- Jasmin Wöhr (born 1980), German tennis player

== See also ==
- Jasmina
- Jasmine (given name)
- LiveJasmin, a pornography website
