= Jasmina =

Jasmin, Jasminko / Jasmina, Jasminka
- Gender: Male / Female

Origin
- Origin: Persian
- Meaning: Gift of God; God's gift
- Region of origin: between Central, Western and South Asia

Other names
- Related names: Yasmin, یاسمین, یاسمن ، Jasmin, Jasmina, Jessamine, Ismenia, Jaslyn, Jaslynn, Jasmyn, Jassmine Jasmine

Jasmina (Serbian Cyrillic: Јасмина), sometimes Jasminka, as a feminine variant, and Jasmin (Serbian Cyrillic: Јасмин), sometimes Jasminko, as a masculine variant, are given names used in Bosnia and Herzegovina, Croatia, Macedonia, Montenegro, Serbia, Bulgaria and Slovenia, and same as a given name Jasmine, which is the common form in German, Romance and English-speaking countries, although almost always as a feminine variation.

== Origin ==
These given names, both feminine and masculine variation, refer to a flower of a genus of Jasmine shrub and vine in the olive family, whose taxon name ultimately derives etymologically from the Old Persian, Yasameen (transl. Gift from God), used in Persian as given name Yasmin

== Variants and spelling ==
In Serbo-Croatian, Slovenian and Macedonian, Jasmine (feminine), and Jasmin (masculine), is a common spelling, however, there are other variations of these names, such as: Jasminko for masculine, and Jasminka for feminine variation, and ways of spelling them, such as: Yasmin and Yasmina, etc. However, it's assumed that Jasmina and Jasmin variation are most popular with Bosnian Muslim population, while variation Jasminka and Jasminko with Serbian, Croatian and other former-Yugoslavs.

== Usage ==
Notable people with the name include:

=== Female ===
  - Jasmina Bier (born 1997), German pararower
  - Jasmina Cibic, Slovenian performance, installation and film artist
  - Jasmina Đokić, Serbian painter
  - Jasmin Darznik (born 1973), Iranian–American writer
  - Jasminka Domaš, writer, journalist and scientist
  - Jasmina Hostert (born 1982), Bosnian-German politician
  - Jasmin Hutter (born 1978), Swiss politician
  - Jasmina Ilić (born 1985) Serbian professional basketball player
  - Jasmina Jankovic (born 1986) Bosnian-born Dutch team handball player
  - Jasmina Kajtazović (born 1991) Slovenian-born Bosnian tennis player
  - Jasmina Keber (born 1988) Slovenian badminton player
  - Jasmina Mihajlović (born 1960) Serbian writer and literary critic
  - Jasmina Mukaetova (born 1981) Macedonian pop singer
  - Jasmin Ouschan (born 1986), Austrian pool player
  - Jasmina Perazić (born 1960) former Serbia n basketball player
  - Jasmin Schornberg (born 1986), German canoeist
  - Jasmin Schwiers (born 1982), German actress
  - Jasmina Suter (born 1995), Swiss alpine ski racer
  - Jasmina Tešanović (born 1954) Serbian feminist author and political activist
  - Jasmina Tinjić, Bosnian tennis player
  - Jasmin Wagner (born 1980), German pop singer, actress and model
  - Jasmin Wöhr (born 1980), German tennis player
  - Jasmina Zapotoczna (born 1994), Polish professional boxer

==== Fictional characters ====
  - Jasminka Antonenko, fictional character in Little Witch Academia

=== Male ===
  - Jasmin Burić (born 1987), Bosnian goalkeeper
  - Jasmin Handanović (born 1978), Slovenian goalkeeper

== Popular culture ==
Uses of the name in popular culture include Greek-German singer Leo Leandros' 1962 pop hit "Lebwohl, Jasmina!", and also Jasmina an album by Dado Polumenta. Ajde, ajde Jasmina is a song by Bosnian pop-singer Zdravko Čolić.
