= Jasmine (given name) =

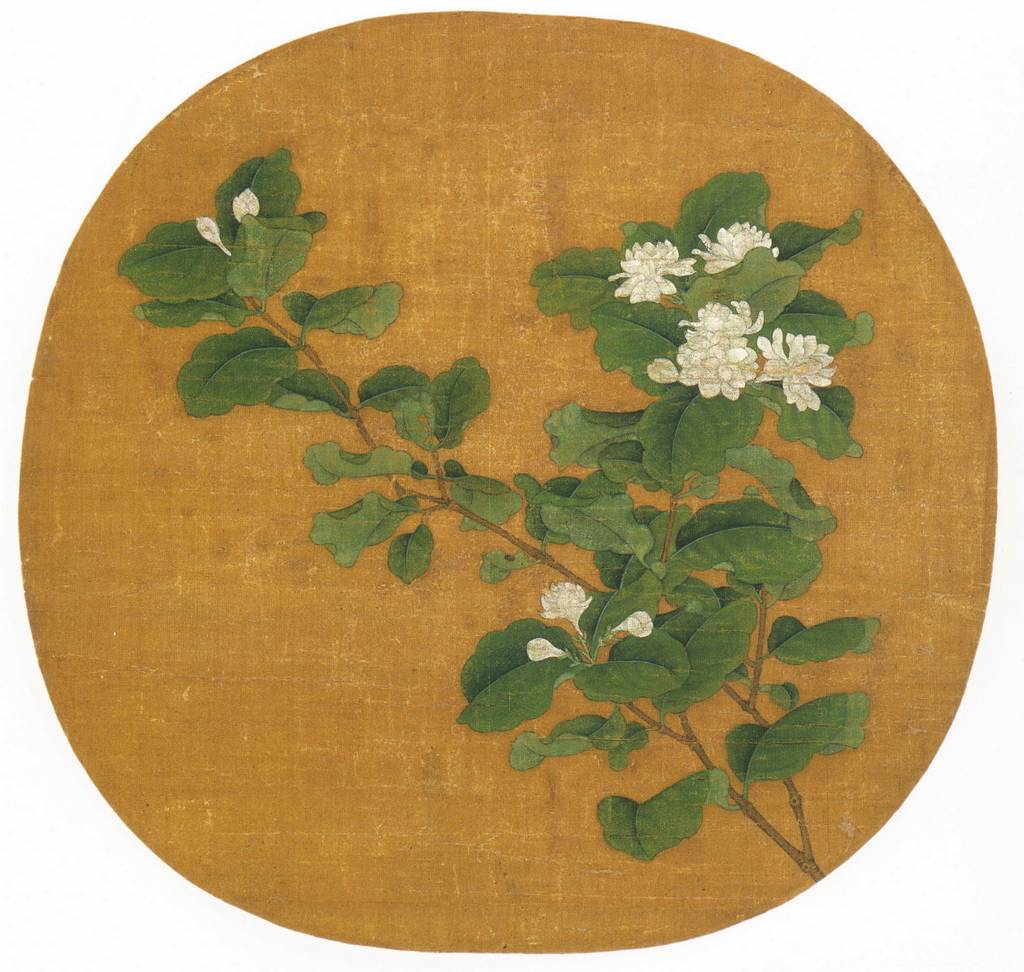
- Jasmine is derived from the name of the flower jasmine.
- Gender: Female

Origin
- Language: Persian (ultimate origin)
- Meaning: A type of flower (jasmine)
- Region of origin: Iran

Other names
- Related names: Yasmin, یاسمین, یاسمن ، Jasmin, Jasmina, Jessamine, Ismenia, Jaslyn, Jaslynn, Jasmyn, Jassmine, Jasmine, Jazmin, Jazmine

Jasmine is a feminine given name.

== History ==
The English name is a reference to the plant of the same name. In terms of etymology, the word jasmine is of Persian origin (in Persian: Yasmin). It entered the English language through Old French.

Jasmine is one of the most popular names in the Western world and has numerous spellings. In the United States, it entered popular use in 1973, and from 1986 until 2008 was among the 100 most popular names for American girls. It has declined in popularity, but remains among the top 200 most popular names for girls in the United States. In the Arab World, Turkey, Brazil, Israel, Hungary, Belgium, and Argentina, the name Jasmine, or one of its variants, remains popular.

=== Cognates ===
- Yasmin/Yasmina (Arabic)
- Jasmijn (Dutch)
- Jasmin (French, male name)
- Jazmín/Yazmín (Spanish)
- Jasmine, Yasmin, Jasmin, Jasmina (Indonesian)
- Jasmina/Jasminka (Serbo-Croatian, Slovene)
- Jázmin (Hungarian)
- Iasmin/Iasmina (Romanian)
- Jessamine (English)
- Yasemin (Turkish)
- Yasmin (Persian and Portuguese)
- Hasmik (Armenian)

== Notable people with the name ==
=== Jasmine ===
- Jasmine Armfield (b. 1998), British actress
- Jasmine Artiga (b. 1992), American professional boxer
- Jasmine Bayes, British actress
- Jasmine Camacho-Quinn (b. 1996), Puerto Rican hurdler
- Jasmine Cheung, Hong Kong rugby union player
- Jasmine Suraya Chin (b. 1989), Malaysian Actress
- Jasmine Ting Chu (b. 1981), Taiwanese singer-songwriter, known mononymously as "Jasmine"
- Jasmine Crockett (b. 1981), American politician
- Jasmine Curtis-Smith (b. 1994), Filipina-Australian actress
- Jasmine van den Bogaerde (b. 1996), English singer, better known as "Birdy"
- Jasmine Dickey (b. 2000), American basketball player
- Jasmine Lepore Fiore (1981–2009), American model and murder victim
- Jasmine Guinness (b. 1976), Irish fashion model and member of the Guinness family
- Jasmine Guy (b. 1962), American actress and singer
- Jasmine Harman (b. 1975), British television presenter
- Jasmine (Japanese singer) (b. 1989), Japanese singer
- Jasmine Jobson (b. 1995), English actress
- Jasmine Junusbayeva (born 2008), Uzbek rhythmic gymnast
- Jasmine Cephas Jones (b. 1989), American actress
- Jasmine Lennard (b. 1985), British model and reality television star
- Jasmine Lister (b. 1992), American basketball player and coach
- Jasmine Paolini (b. 1996), Italian professional tennis player
- Jasmine Petersen, South African politician
- Jasmine Althea Ramilo (born 2008), Filippina rhythmic gymnast
- Jasmine Richards (b. 1990), Canadian actress and singer
- Jasmine Richardson (b. 1993), Canadian convicted murderer
- Jasmine Salinas (b. 1992), American drag racer
- Jasmine Sanders (b. 1991), German-American model
- Jasmine Sandlas (b. 1985), Indian singer
- Jasmine Sagginario (b. 1994), American singer-songwriter
- Jasmine Sim (b. 1993), Singaporean actress and model
- Jasmine Sokko (b. 1995), Singaporean singer-songwriter
- Jasmine Thomas (b. 1989), American basketball player
- Jasmine Thompson (b. 2000), English singer
- Jasmine Tookes (b. 1991), American model
- Jasmine Trias (b. 1986), American singer
- Jasmine Trinca (b. 1981), Italian actress
- Jasmine Twitty (b. 1989), American associate justice
- Jasmine Valentin (b. 1976), Finnish Kale singer
- Jasmine Villegas (b. 1993), American singer, better known as "Jasmine V"
- Jasmine Walker (born 1998), American basketball player
- Jasmine Yakhlakova (born 2010), Uzbek-Emirati rhythmic gymnast
- Jasmine You (1979–2009), Japanese musician

=== Jazmin ===
- Jazmín Álvarez (born 1999), Colombian skateboarder
- Jazmin Bean (born 2003), English singer-songwriter, social media personality and makeup artist
- Jazmín Beccar Varela (born 1986), Argentine actress
- Jazmin Carlin (born 1990), British swimmer
- Jazmin Chaudhry (born 1985), Bangladesh-born American pornographic actress
- Jazmín Chebar (born 1973), Argentine fashion designer
- Jazmín De Grazia (1984–2012), Argentine model and television presenter
- Jazmin Duran (born 1994), Bolivian
- Jazmín Elizondo (born 1994), Costa Rican footballer
- Jazmín Enrigue (born 2000), Mexican footballer
- Jazmin Grace Grimaldi (b. 1992), the eldest child of Albert II, Prince of Monaco
- Jazmin Hernández (born 1989), Mexican volleyball player
- Jazmin Hiaya (9??–1030s), Arab governor
- Jazmin Hotham (born 2000), New Zealand rugby sevens player
- Jazmin Lopez (born 1984), Argentine filmmaker
- Jazmín López Becker (born 1992), Argentine windsurfer
- Jazmín Mendoza (born 2002), Paraguayan handball player
- Jazmín Mercado (born 1975), Ecuadorian footballer
- Jazmín Ortenzi (born 2001), Argentine tennis player
- Jazmín Pinedo (b. 1990), Peruvian actress and model
- Jazmin Sawyers (b. 1994), British long jumper
- Jaz Shelley (born 2000), Australian basketball player
- Jazmín Taborda, Ecuadorian road cyclist
- Jazmin Truesdale (born 1987), American comic artist
- Jazmin Wardlow (born 1997), American soccer player
- Jazmin Whitley, American fashion designer
- Jazmín Zepeda Burgos (born 1976), Mexican politician

=== Jazmine ===
- Jazmine Hughes (b. 1991), American editor
- Jazmine Jones (born 1996), American basketball player
- Jazmine Reeves (b. 1992), American soccer player
- Jazmine Smith, American businesswoman
- Jazmine Sullivan (b. 1987), American singer-songwriter
- Jazmine Sepúlveda (born 1985), Puerto Rican basketball player

=== Jazmyn ===
- Jazmyn Foberg (b. 2000), American gymnast
- Jazmyn Simon (born 1980), American actress and author

=== Jazmyne ===
- Jazmyne Avant (b. 1990), American soccer player
- Jazmyne Denhollander (born 1994), Canadian slalom canoer

=== Jazzmine ===
- Jazzmine Raycole Dillingham (b. 1988), American actress, better known as Jazz Raycole

== Fictional characters ==
- Jasmine, character in the Aladdin franchise
- Jasmine Delaney, character in the Australian soap opera Home and Away
- Jasmine Fisher, character from the soap opera EastEnders
- Jasmine Thomas, character from the British soap opera Emmerdale
