= Spaho =

Spaho is a Bosniak and Albanian surname derived from Ottoman sipahi (known as spahije in Serbo-Croatian). Notable people include:

- Edmond Spaho (born 1958), Albanian politician
- Fehim Spaho (1887–1942), Bosnian Grand Mufti of Yugoslavia
- Mehmed Spaho (1883–1939), Bosnian politician
- Mikel Spaho (born 1982), Albanian footballer
- Norion Spaho (born 1986), Albanian footballer
- Sulejman Spaho (1949–2025), Serbian politician

== See also ==
- Spahić
- Spahia
- Spahija
- Sipahioğlu
