= Jessamine =

Jessamine may refer to:

== People ==
- a variant of Jasmine (given name)
- Jessamine Buxton, Australian artist
- Lady Jessamine Harmsworth, British noblewoman
- Jessamine Hoagland (1879-1957), American businesswoman
- Jessamine Shumate (1902–1990), American artist, historian and cartographer
- Jessamine S. Whitney, American health professional
- Jessamine Chapman Williams (1881–1963), American home economist
- Jessamyn Duke, American mixed martial artist
- Jessamyn Fairfield, American physicist
- Jessamyn Lovell, American artist
- Jessamyn Rodriguez, Canadian-American entrepreneur
- Jessamyn Sauceda, Mexican athlete
- Jessamyn Stanley, American yoga teacher
- Jessamyn West (disambiguation)
- Clorinda Low Lucas (née Elizabeth Jessemine Kauikeolani Low; 1895–1986) American Hawaiian social worker

== Plants ==
- Cestrum, a genus of flowering plants
  - Cestrum nocturnum, night-blooming jessamine
  - Cestrum parqui, willow-leaved jessamine (green cestrum)
- Jasminum, a genus of shrubs and vines in the olive family
- Gardenia jasminoides, cape jessamine
- Gelsemium rankinii, Rankin's jessamine or swamp jessamine
- Gelsemium sempervirens, yellow jessamine or Carolina jessamine
- Murraya paniculata, orange jessamine

== Other uses ==
- Jessamine (band), a 1990s post-rock band from Ohio
- Jessamine Stakes, an American flat Thoroughbred horse race for two-year-old filles held annually at Keeneland in Lexington, Kentucky
- Jessamine County, Kentucky, United States
  - Jessamine, Kentucky, an unincorporated community in Jessamine County, Kentucky, United States
- "Jesamine" (originally "When Jesamine Goes"), popular UK song recorded by The Casuals
- USLHT Jessamine, a lighthouse tender based in Baltimore from 1881 to 1921
