= Jasmin =

Jasmin may refer to jasmine. It may also refer to:

== Plants ==
- Gardenia jasminoides, also called gardenia
- Jasminocereus, a genus of cacti
- Jasminum officinale, the flowering plant commonly called jasmine
- Solanum laxum, syn. Solanum jasminoides

== People ==
- Jasmin (given name), a given name derived from Jasmine, the flower
- Jasmin (singer) (born 1977), Russian pop singer, actress, model, and TV presenter
- Jacques Jasmin (1798–1864), Occitan poet
- Paul Jasmin (1935–2025), American actor and artist
- Victoire Jasmin (born 1955), French politician
- Jasminka Domaš (born 1948), Croatian writer, journalist and scientist

== Other uses ==
- Jasmin station, a train station on Line 9 of the Paris Metro
- Jasmin, Saskatchewan, a hamlet in Saskatchewan, Canada
- JASMIN, a super-data-cluster operated by the Centre for Environmental Data Analysis in the United Kingdom

== See also ==
- Jasmine (disambiguation)
- Yasmin (disambiguation)
