= Yasmin =

Yasmin, Yasmine, or Yasmina may refer to:

== People ==
- Yasmin (name), a feminine given name, and sometimes a surname
- Yasmin (musician) (born 1993), English singer, songwriter, and DJ
- Yasmine (pornographic actress), Yasmine Lafitte, French actress
- Yasmine (singer) (1972–2009), Belgian singer, presenter and television personality

== Films ==
- Yasmina (film), a 1927 French silent film directed by André Hugon
- Yasmin (1955 film), an Indian Hindi-language film directed by Abdur Rashid Kardar
- Yasmin (2004 film), a British/German film directed by Kenneth Glenaan
- Yasmine (film), a 2014 Bruneian film directed by Siti Kamaluddin

== Other uses ==
- Yasmin (drug), a brand name of the birth control pill ethinylestradiol/drospirenone
- Yasmin, a doll in the Bratz fashion doll line

== See also ==
- Jasmin (disambiguation)
- Jasmine (disambiguation)
- Yasemin (disambiguation)
