= Yasemin (disambiguation) =

Yasemin is a 1988 German-language film.

Yasemin may also refer to:

== Given name ==
- Yasemin Akat (born 1956), Turkish fashion designer
- Yasemin Allen (born 1989), English-Turkish actress
- Yasemin Anagöz (born 1998), Turkish recurve archer
- Yasemin Arda (born 1978), Turkish-Belgian management scientist and operations researcher
- Yasemin Can Arslan (born 1992), Turkish long-distance runner
- Yasemin Bradley (born 1966), Turkish physician
- Yasemin Can (born 1996), Kenyan-Turkish long-distance runner
- Yasemin Besen-Cassino (born 1978), American sociologist
- Yasemin Cegerek (born 1977), Dutch politician of Turkish descent
- Yasemin Özata Çetinkaya (born 1976), Turkish civil servant
- Yasemin Çongar (born 1966), Turkish journalist, writer, and translator
- Yasemin Begüm Dalgalar (born 1988), Turkish basketball player
- Yasemin Dalkılıç (born 1979), Turkish free diver
- Yasemin Güler (born 1994), Turkish handballer
- Yasemin Güveli (born 1999), Turkish volleyball player
- Yasemin Horasan (born 1983), Turkish professional basketball player
- Yasemin Kimyacıoğlu (born 1985), Turkish-American basketball player
- Yasemin Kozanoğlu (born 1978), Turkish actress and model
- Yasemin Mori (born 1982), Turkish alternative rock singer
- Yasemin Öz, Turkish lawyer and LGBT rights activist
- Yasemin Şahin (born 1988), Turkish female handballer
- Yasemin Şamdereli (born 1973), Turkish-German actress
- Yasemin Smit (born 1984), Dutch water polo player
- Yasemin Ustalar (born 1975), Turkish boxer
- Yasemin Yalçın (born 1964), Turkish actress and comedian
- Yasemin Adar Yiğit (born 1991), Turkish freestyle wrestler
- Yasemin Beyza Yılmaz (born 2001), Turkish female sport shooter
- Özlem Yasemin Taşkın (born 1985), Turkish long-distance freestyle swimmer
