= Spahić =

Origin
- Languages: Bosnian and Croatian via Turkish from Persian
- Meaning: descendant of a sipahi/cavalryman
- Region of origin: Bosnia and Herzegovina

Other names
- Variant forms: Spahic, Spahich
- See also: Spahija, Spahia, Sipahioğlu, Spaho

Spahić (IPA: [ˈspaxitɕ]) or Spahic/Spahich is a Bosnian surname. It is derived from the Turkish term sipahi (from Persian: سپاهی (sepāhī) with the meaning "soldier") for a cavalryman by adding the South Slavic surname forming suffix -ić.

People with the surname include:

- Aleksa Spahić (1899–1975), Croatian athlete
- Amir Spahić (born 1983), Bosnian footballer
- Amira Spahić (born 1983), Bosnian footballer
- Avdo Spahić (born 1997), Bosnian-German footballer
- Emir Spahić (born 1980), Bosnian former footballer
- Ibrahim Spahic (born 1952), Bosnian politician
- Jasmin Spahić (born 1980), Bosnian former footballer
- Ognjen Spahić (born 1977), Montenegrin novelist
