= Southern School of Energy and Sustainability =

American public school in North Carolina

Location
- 800 Clayton Road; Durham, North Carolina 27703; United States; 36°00′05″N 78°49′56″W

Information
- Type: Public
- Established: 1955 (71 years ago)
- School district: Durham Public Schools
- CEEB code: 341088
- Principal: Brandon Hodges
- Teaching staff: 75.10 (on an FTE basis)
- Grades: 9–12
- Enrollment: 1,352 (2023–2024)
- Student to teacher ratio: 18.00
- Campus type: Urban
- Colors: Red and white
- Team name: Spartans
- Website: dpsnc.net/domain/58

Southern School of Energy and Sustainability (also known as Southern Durham or Southern) is located in Durham, North Carolina, United States. The school is part of Durham Public Schools. Southern is a comprehensive Science, Technology, Engineering & Mathematics (STEM) magnet program in Durham, North Carolina serving students in grades 9-12. Students explore five pathways, find their niche, and commit to developing 21st century skills required in today’s changing world. In working with myriad community partners, students participate in experiences, collaborating to identify local, national, or global sustainable issues and develop solutions and action plans where energy and sustainability studies are taken throughout elective and core curriculum. SSES faculty and staff work to uphold the school’s motto: Educate, Engage, and Develop to Enroll, Employ, and Enlist.

== Notable alumni ==
- Dimple Ajmera, politician and certified public accountant serving on the Charlotte City Council
- Ricky Council IV, basketball player for Philadelphia 76ers
- Clyde Edgerton, author and creative writing professor
- Julian Gamble, basketball player in the Israeli Basketball Premier League
- David Garrard, NFL quarterback and Pro Bowl selection in 2009
- Aaron Hall, NFL defensive tackle
- Kendall Hinton, NFL wide receiver and quarterback
- Anthony King, professional basketball player
- David Noel, NBA player and 2005 NCAA basketball champion with UNC
- Ayesha Rascoe, host of NPR's Weekend Edition Sunday
- Jazmin Truesdale, creator of AZA comics, a comic book that features diverse female characters
- Jaylen Wright, NFL running back
