= Jasmine (disambiguation) =

Jasmine is a flowering shrub of the genus Jasminum. It may also refer to:

== Plants ==
Several other plants unrelated to Jasminum with similar flowers, including:

- Brazilian jasmine Mandevilla sanderi
- Cape jasmine Gardenia
- Carolina jasmine, Gelsemium sempervirens
- Chilean jasmine, Mandevilla laxa
- Madagascar jasmine, Stephanotis floribunda
- New Zealand jasmine, Parsonsia capsularis
- Night-blooming jasmine, Cestrum nocturnum
- Night-flowering jasmine, Nyctanthes arbor-tristis
- Orange jasmine, Murraya paniculata
- Red jasmine, Plumeria rubra
- Star jasmine, Trachelospermum jasminoides
- Tree jasmine (disambiguation)
- Water jasmine, Wrightia religiosa

== Arts, entertainment, and media ==
=== Music ===
- Jasmine (album), by Keith Jarrett and Charlie Haden
- Jessamine (band), a musical group
- Jasmine Records, a record label
- Mo Li Hua ("Jasmine flower" in Chinese), a popular folk song in China
- Jasmine (song), a 2012 song by Jai Paul
- Jasmine, a song by Miles Gilderdale from Broken Sword 5: The Serpent's Curse

=== Other arts, entertainment, and media ===
- Jasmine (novel), a 1989 novel by Bharati Mukherjee
- Jasmine (TV series), a Philippine television series
- Jasmine: The Battle for the Mid-Realm, a role-playing card game
- Jasmine (film), a 2015 film by Dax Phelan

== Politics ==
- Jasmine Revolution (disambiguation)
- Jasmine Revolution in China, February 2011

== Other uses ==
- Jasmine (color)
- Jasmine (JavaScript testing framework), a unit testing framework for the JavaScript programming language
- Jasmine rice, a type of long-grain rice
- Jasmine, the hypothetical founding ancestor of Haplogroup J (mtDNA) in The Seven Daughters of Eve, a 2001 book about the science of human mitochondrial genetics

== See also ==
- Jasmin (disambiguation)
- Yasmin (disambiguation)
- 茉莉花 (disambiguation)
