= Khezri =

Khezri may refer to:

- Khezri Dasht Beyaz, a city in South Khorasan Province, Iran
- Hossein Khezri, Iranian activist
- Jasmin Khezri (b. 1967), Iranian artist and writer
