= Mo Li Hua (disambiguation) =

Mo Li Hua (Chinese: 茉莉花; lit. 'Jasmine Flower') is a Chinese folk song.

It may also refer to:

- White Jasmine, 1980 Taiwanese film starring Wang Kuan-hsiung and Sylvia Chang
- Jasmine Women (茉莉花开), a 2004 Chinese film
- 2011 Chinese pro-democracy protests (中国茉莉花活动)

== See also ==
- Jasmine (disambiguation)
- White jasmine (disambiguation)
