= Dan Cassino =

American political scientist, historian, and poll analyzer

- Born: 1980 (age 45–46)
- Spouse: Yasemin Besen-Cassino

Academic background
- Education: BA, University of Arizona; MA, PhD, 2005, Stony Brook University

Daniel Cassino (born 1980) is an American political scientist, historian, and poll analyzer. He is a professor of political science at Fairleigh Dickinson University. Cassino is married to sociologist scientist Yasemin Besen-Cassino and the two often collaborate on research projects.

== Early life and education ==
Cassino earned his Bachelor of Arts degree from the University of Arizona before enrolling at Stony Brook University for his graduate degrees.

== Career ==
Alongside his wife, sociologist Yasemin Besen-Cassino, they co-authored Consuming Politics: Jon Stewart, Branding, and the Youth Vote in America in 2009 through the Fairleigh Dickinson University Press. The book, which is based during the 2008 United States presidential election, studied how modern youth viewed politics differently than their ancestors. Through hundreds of in-depth interviews and telephone surveys, they concluded that voting-aged youth in 2008 saw politics "in the same way that they see consumer goods and brands."

Independently, Cassino has done research into the credibility of Fox News, which was also the basis of his 2016 book Fox News and American politics: how one channel shapes American politics and society. Prior to the book's publication, Cassino led a research poll in 2011 which concluded that regular viewers of Fox News were less informed about current events than those who did not watch any news at all. The following year, Cassino and his research team randomly assessed 1,185 American citizens about what news sources they had watched in the past week and then asked them questions about current events. They found that those who watched Fox News and MSNBC were less likely to state the correct answer compared to listeners of NPR and Sunday morning political talk shows. In response, the Fox News spokesperson said "Considering FDU's undergraduate school is ranked as one of the worst in the country...we suggest the school invest in improving its weak academic program instead of spending money on frivolous polling – their student body does not deserve to be so ill-informed." His research accumulated into a book titled Fox News and American politics: how one channel shapes American politics and society, which was published during the 2016 United States presidential election.

In 2019, Cassino and his wife published a study which found that Black women were more likely to report sexual harassment in the workplace than white women. However, their research also showed that African American women were more likely to experience harassment compared to white women. During the COVID-19 pandemic in North America, Cassino analyzed survey data and concluded that American men were less likely than American women to wash their hands.

== Selected publications ==
The following is a list of selected publications:

- Social Research Methods by Example: Applications in the Modern World (2017)
- Fox News and American politics: how one channel shapes American politics and society (2016)
- Research Methods by Example (2014)
- Consuming Politics: Jon Stewart, Branding, and the Youth Vote in America (2009)
- The aggregated consequences of motivated reasoning and the dynamics of partisan presidential approval (2007)
