= Olivera Miljaković =

Austrian opera singer

- Оливера Миљаковић
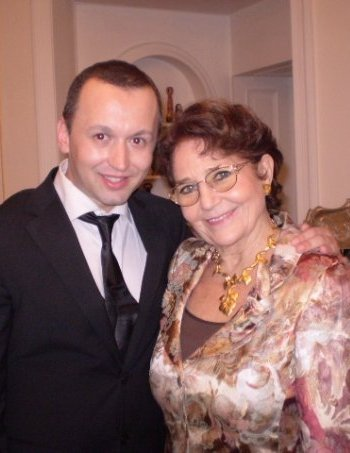
- Miljaković with tenor Jasmin Bašić
- Born: 26 April 1934; Belgrade, Serbia, Kingdom of Yugoslavia
- Occupation: Opera singer (soprano)

Olivera Miljaković (Serbian Cyrillic: Оливера Миљаковић, pronounced [ɔliˈʋɛra miˈʎakɔʋit͡ɕ]; born 26 April 1934 is a Serbian-born opera singer, who had a major career centered on the Vienna State Opera.

== Training ==
Born in Belgrade, Miljaković demonstrated early her singing talent. She studied solo singing with Mile Stojadinović, then at Academy of Music in Belgrade with Josip Rijavec and Nikola Cvejić, and later furthered her studies with Gina Cigna in Milan and Ludwig Weber in Vienna.

== Career ==
She was engaged in 1960 by National Theatre in Belgrade Opera for two years. On the advice of the contralto Biserka Cvejić she then went to Vienna and in 1962 became a member of Vienna State Opera, where she achieved an accomplished career as a soloist. As early as 1965, she sang Feodor in Herbert von Karajan's performance of Boris Godunov at Salzburg Festival and a young shepherd in Tannhäuser at Bayreuth Festival. Her first great success in Vienna State Oper was Despina (Così fan tutte, 1967), followed by Susanna (The Marriage of Figaro, 1968), Zerlina (Don Giovanni, 1969), Serpina (La serva padrona, 1970), Blonde (Die Entführung aus dem Serail), and others. Miljaković performed on many important opera and concert stages and festivals, with conductors such as Lovro von Matačić, Leonard Bernstein, Zubin Mehta, Wolfgang Sawallisch, Lorin Maazel, Georges Prêtre and Carlos Kleiber. She also participated in a number of noticeable opera recordings with the same conductors.

Since 1980 she has run a private school for solo singing and from 1987 till 1991 she worked as a professor in the Opera Studio of Vienna State Opera. Among her students was the soprano Vlatka Oršanić. Miljaković holds many master classes and concerts all over the world; she was music director of Bassano del Grappa OperaEstate festival, and from 2003 music director of Ambassadors concert.

In 1984 she was given the honorific title Kammersängerin for distinguished singers of opera.

For her work in the field of culture, she was awarded with Golden Ring of the Vienna State Opera and with Silver and Golden Medal from the Republic of Austria.

== Recordings ==
=== Video ===
- Der Rosenkavalier – Marianne (1994)
- Ariadne auf Naxos – Echo (1979)
- Gräfin Mariza – Manja (1974)
- Dafne – Dafne (1972)
- Kaiserin Josephine – Josephine (1971)
- Fidelio – Marzelline (1970)
- Così fan tutte – Despina (1970)
- Carmen – Frasquita (1969)

=== Audio ===
- Der Rosenkavalier – Marianne (1994)
- Olivera Miljaković Lieder die ich gerne singe – (1993)
- Symphony No. 9 (Choral) in D minor
- Paganini – Bella Ciretti (1977)
- Gräfin Mariza – Manja (1974)
- Un ballo in maschera – Oscar (1973)
- Arabella – Zdenka (1973)
- Die Csárdásfürstin – Countess Stasi (1971)
- The Magic Flute – Papagena (1970)
- Don Giovanni – Zerlina (1970)
- Così fan tutte – Despina (1968)
- Boris Godunov – Feodor (1966)

== Recognition and awards ==
- Golden Ring (Vienna State Opera)
- Silver Medal (Republic of Austria)
- Golden Medal (Republic of Austria)
