= Steve Cross (comedian) =

English comedian

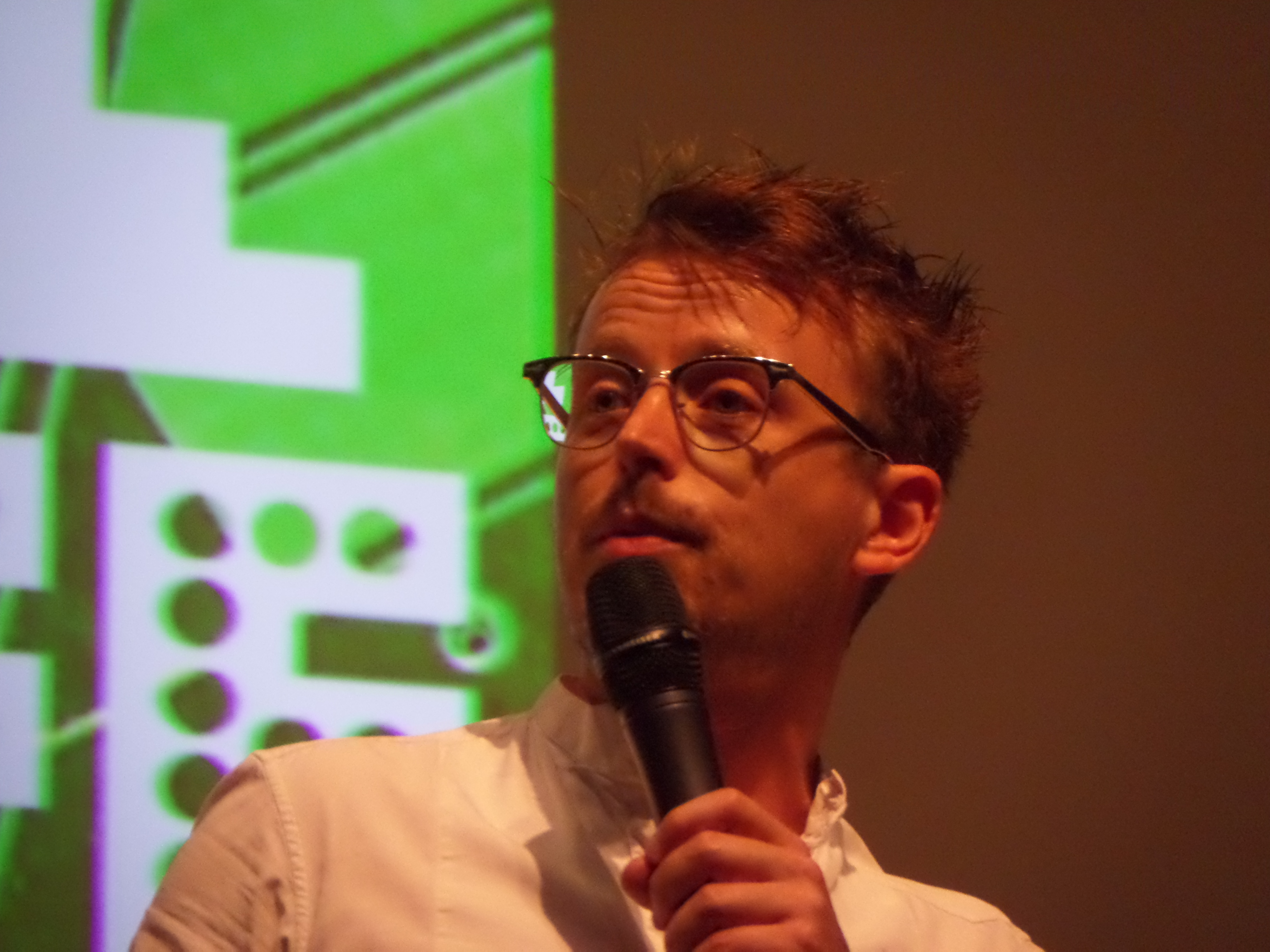
Cross in 2014

Cross's voice
recorded August 2014

Steve Cross is an English comedian. He is the founder of Bright Club and Science Showoff. He is a past winner of the Joshua Phillips Award for Innovation in Science Engagement. In 2007, he was the head curator of the Medicine Man gallery at the Wellcome Collection. Since March 2026, he has cohosted the podcast Philosophy Playdate with the philosopher Christabel Cane.
