= Bright Club =

International series of comedy events

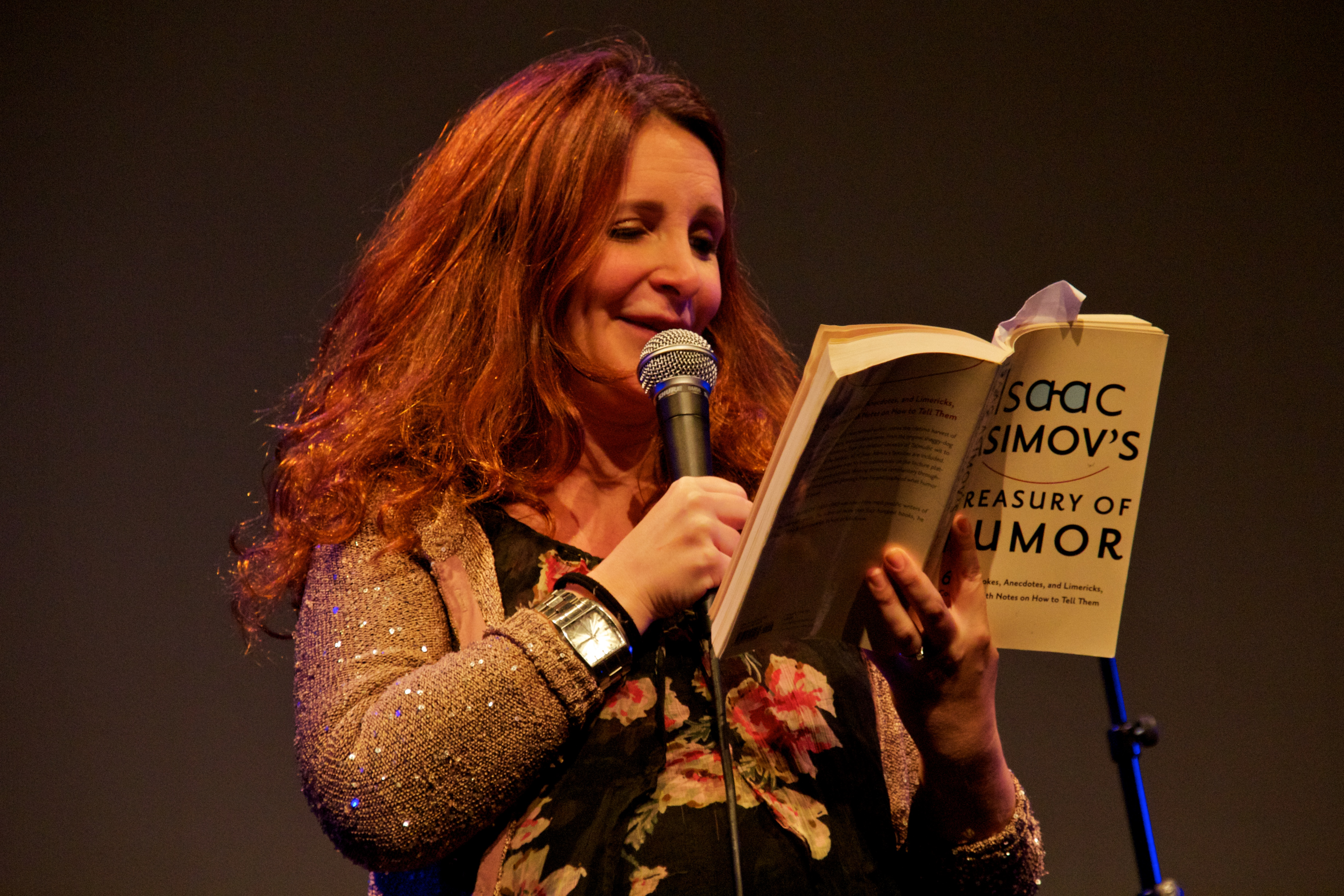
Comedian Lucy Porter at Bright Club London in 2011

Bright Club is a collection of comedy-club-style events in the United Kingdom, Ireland, and Australia promoting public engagement by scientists, academics and others with specialist knowledge. It has been described by The Guardian as "a 'thinking person's' comedy night", and by Londonist as "where funny meets brains".

== Format ==
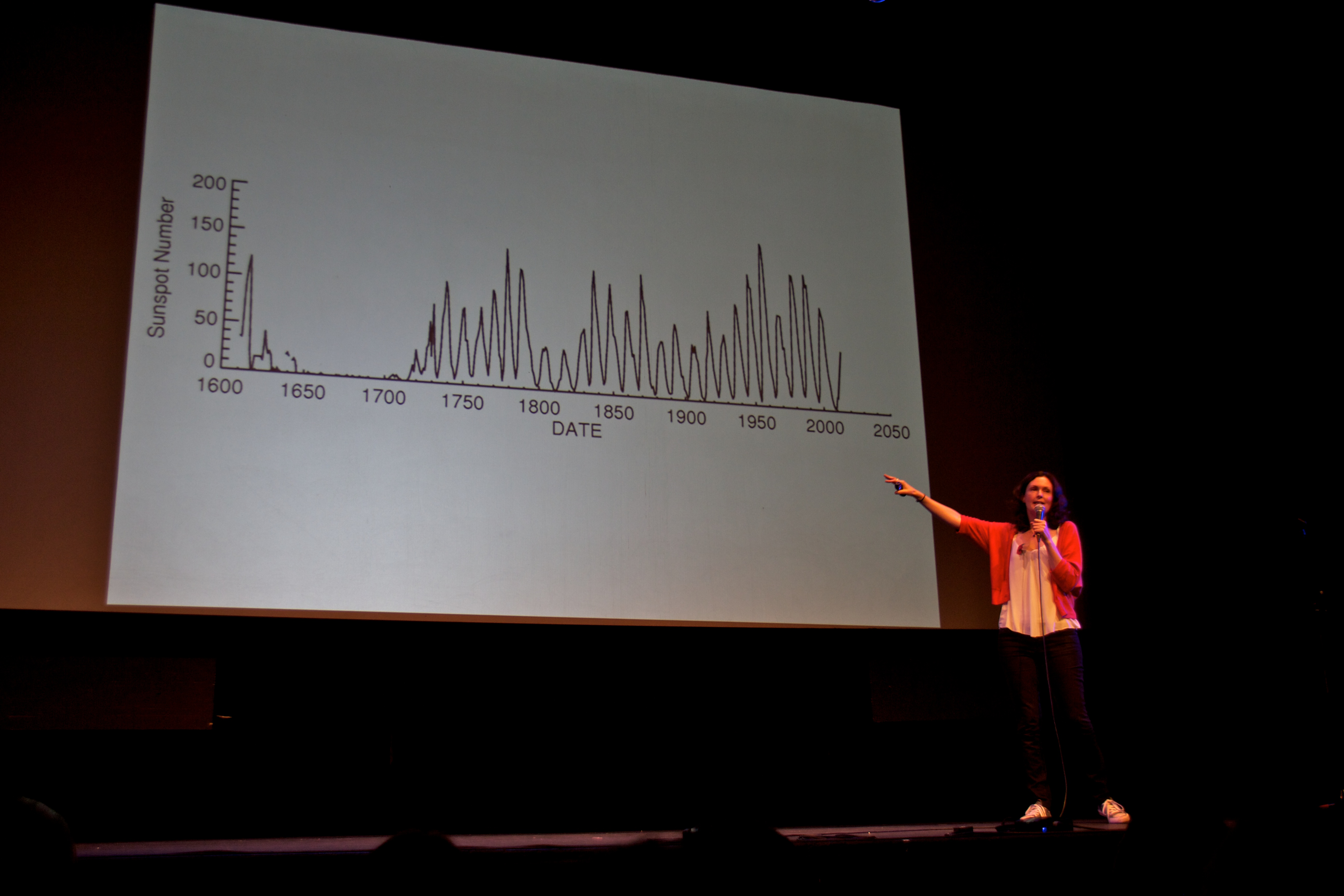
Solar physicist Lucie Green talking at Bright Club London in 2011

Every event has a number of speakers, normally university researchers, each of whom gives a short, funny talk related to their area of knowledge and a theme for the night. There is a compere, and usually musicians play a set halfway through and at the end of the evening.

== Development ==
Bright Club started at University College London as the brainchild of Steve Cross and Miriam Miller. The first event was held in May 2009 and a Bright Club now happens in London once a month. Bright Club Manchester held its first event in May 2010 and now hosts events every few months. Bright Club Wales held its first event, in Cardiff, in November 2010.

The Centre for Life in Newcastle upon Tyne launched their first Bright Club in July 2011, hosted by their Comedian in Residence, Helen Keen. Two more were held during 2011 and the events will continue into 2012.

Bright Club Edinburgh launched during the Edinburgh Festival with a show on the BBC@Potterrow stage on 24 August 2011 following a preview gig on 26 July. Regular shows take place at the Stand Comedy Club.

Bright Club Glasgow was launched on 17 November 2011 at The Admiral Bar. In 2012, Bright Club participated in Glasgow International Comedy Festival and shows were also included in the programme for Glasgow Science Festival. Regular shows take place at The Stand Comedy Club.

There has been a one-off Bright Club in Brighton and a small number of 500-seater Bright Clubs in the Bloomsbury Theatre.

Steve Cross won the Joshua Phillips award for innovation in science engagement in a ceremony at the Manchester Science Festival in October 2010.

Bright Club Bristol began in September 2011 and operates on a quarterly basis. It is produced by Sounds of Science team who created Geek Pop.

Bright Clubs have also been held in Australia. Bright Club events were held in Sydney in January 2012 as part of the 2012 Sydney Festival and Bright Club Melbourne started in April 2013. The first Bright Club Melbourne event was part of the Melbourne International Comedy Festival and took place in the Howard Florey Institute.

Bright Club Oxford began in October 2013, running three times a year at the Jericho Tavern pub.

Bright Club St Andrews began in February 2014, running bimonthly during university term time.

Bright Club events have been running in Ireland since 2015. Shows take place in Dublin, Galway, Cork and other locations, and are centrally coordinated by director Jessamyn Fairfield.
