= Tonje Erikstein =

Norwegian footballer (born 1994)

Personal information
- Birth name: Tonje Pedersen
- Date of birth: 8 August 1994 (age 32)
- Place of birth: Alta, Norway
- Height: 1.74 m (5 ft 9 in)
- Position: Midfielder

Team information
- Current team: LSK Kvinner
- Number: 99

Youth career
- Alta

Senior career*
Years	Team	Apps	(Gls)
2012	Alta	20	(1)
2013–2014	Grand Bodø	40	(9)
2015–2022	Kolbotn	157	(23)
2020	→ LSK Kvinner (loan)	5	(1)
2023–	LSK Kvinner	54	(9)

International career
2009	Norway U15	1	(0)
2010	Norway U16	2	(0)
2011	Norway U17	3	(0)
2012	Norway U19	2	(0)
2014–2017	Norway U23	12	(1)
- * Club domestic league appearances and goals as of 12 July 2026

Tonje Erikstein, née Pedersen (born 8 August 1994) is a Norwegian footballer who plays as a midfielder for LSK Kvinner FK.

Hailing from Alta, she played for Alta IF in 2012 before making the move to IK Grand Bodø. Following promotion in 2013, she made her Toppserien debut in April 2014. She then became one of the relatively few Toppserien players from Finnmark. She also represented Norway as a youth international. She moved to Eastern Norway and Kolbotn in 2015.

In the second half of the 2020 Toppserien, she was loaned to a larger club a bit further north in Akershus, LSK Kvinner FK. She would contribute to LSK chasing a high league placement despite Kolbotn fighting against relegationi. In 2023, after Kolbotn had indeed been relegated, Erikstein moved on to LSK Kvinner on a permanent basis.

However, Erikstein missed most of 2023 due to injury. She managed to bounce back to play regularly in 2024. During the 2024 Toppserien, she played her 200th game in Norway's highest league. Following a good 2024 season, her contract was eventually extended with two years.

In the winter window of 2026, she became pregnant, which she announced to the teammates in January and to the media in March. She later spoke about miscarrying in 2025, during the first of which she even played a football game, and how female footballers and their clubs are often unprepared for this facet of women's health. This soon led to Toppserien players being channeled into the health app Nørs.
