= Herakut =

Street Artist Duo (2002)

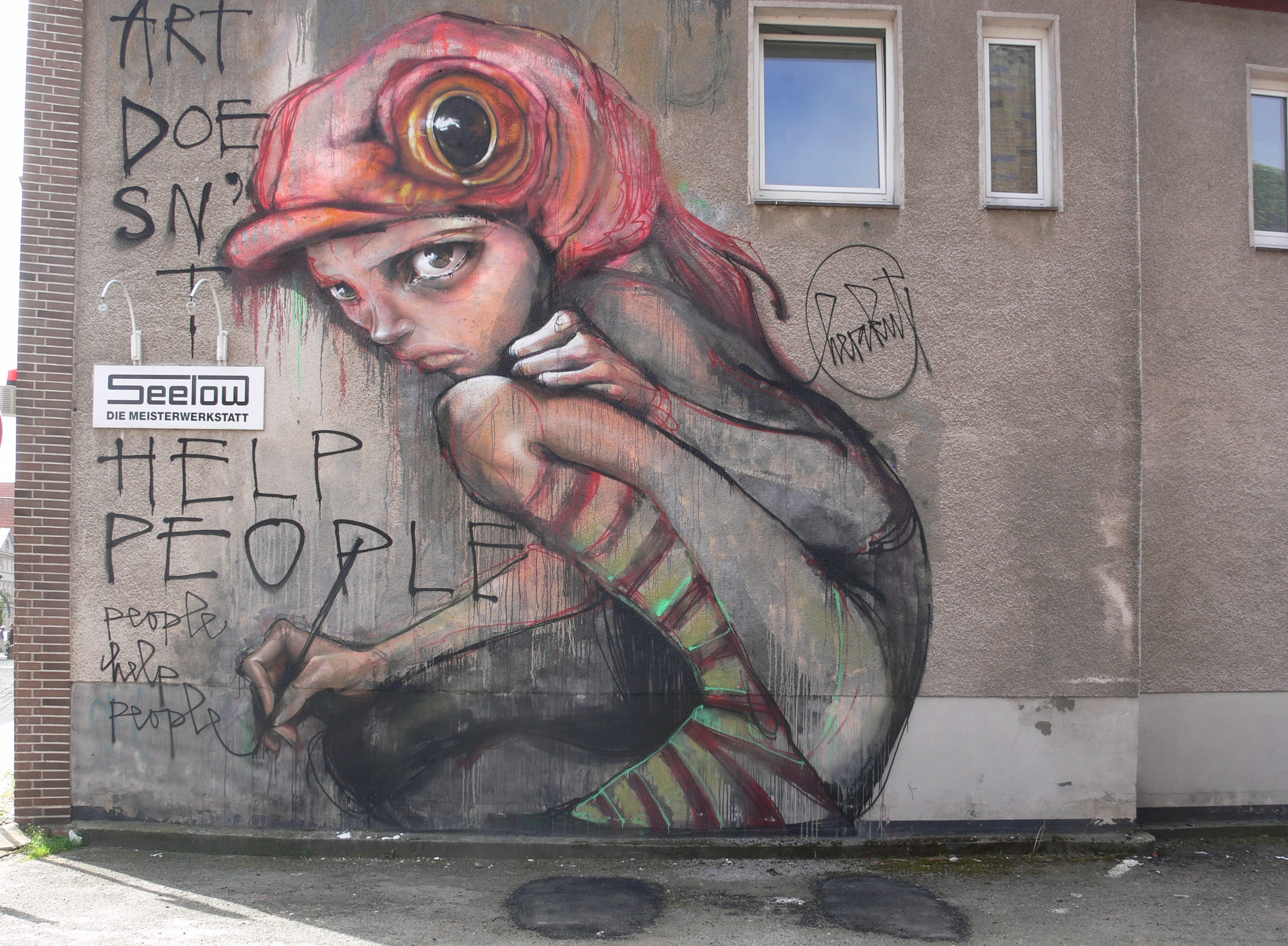
- A Herakut mural at the ARTotale in Lüneburg, Germany.
- Born: Jasmin Siddiqui; 16 February 1982 (age 43); Frankfurt, West Germany Falk Lehman
- Known for: Graffiti; Street art illustrated books graphic novel Social commentary

Herakut is a street artist duo who began painting in 2002. Jasmin Siddiqui is known as Hera, and her partner Falk Lehmann, is known as Akut, hence their portmanteau combined name.

Siddiqui is of German-Pakistani origin, from Frankfurt. She paired with Falk Lehmann in 2004.
