= Contemporary Sociology =

- Discipline: Sociology
- Language: English
- Edited by: Yasemin Besen-Cassino

Publication details
- History: 1972–present
- Publisher: SAGE Publications for the American Sociological Association (United States)
- Frequency: Bimonthly
- Impact factor: 0.34 (2017)

Standard abbreviations
- ISO 4: Contemp. Sociol.

Indexing
- CODEN: C0S0AG
- ISSN: 0094-3061 (print); 1939-8638 (web)
- LCCN: 72621888
- JSTOR: 00943061
- OCLC no.: 958948

Links
- Journal homepage; Online access; Online archive

Contemporary Sociology is a bi-monthly peer-reviewed academic journal of sociology published by SAGE Publications in association with the American Sociological Association since 1972. Each issue of the journal publishes many in-depth as well as brief reviews of recent publications in sociology and related disciplines, as well as a list of publications received that have not been reviewed. In 2010 the journal published just under 400 book reviews. In addition, the journal also publishes a small number of review essays and discursive articles in each issue. The editor-in-chief is Yasemin Besen-Cassino (Montclair State University).

== Abstracting and indexing ==
Contemporary Sociology is abstracted and indexed in Scopus, CSA Sociological Abstracts, Current Contents/Physical, Chemical and Earth Sciences and the Social Sciences Citation Index. According to the Journal Citation Reports, its 2017 impact factor is 0.34, ranking it 134th out of 146 journals in the "Sociology" category.
