= Sipahioğlu =

Origin
- Language: Turkish from Persian
- Meaning: descendant of a sipahi/cavalryman
- Region of origin: Turkey

Other names
- Variant form: Sipahioglu _{(Diaspora)}
- See also: Spahić, Spahia, Spahija

Sipahioğlu is a Turkish surname. It is derived from Persian سپاهی (sepāhī) with the meaning "soldier". People with the surname include:

- Duygu Sipahioğlu (born 1979), Turkish volleyball player
- Gökşin Sipahioğlu (1926–2011), Turkish photographer and photojournalist
- Halil İbrahim Sipahioğlu (1862–1947), Turkish politician
- İlhan Sipahioğlu (1922–1981), Turkish politician
