= Jazmín Chebar =

Argentine artist (born 1973)

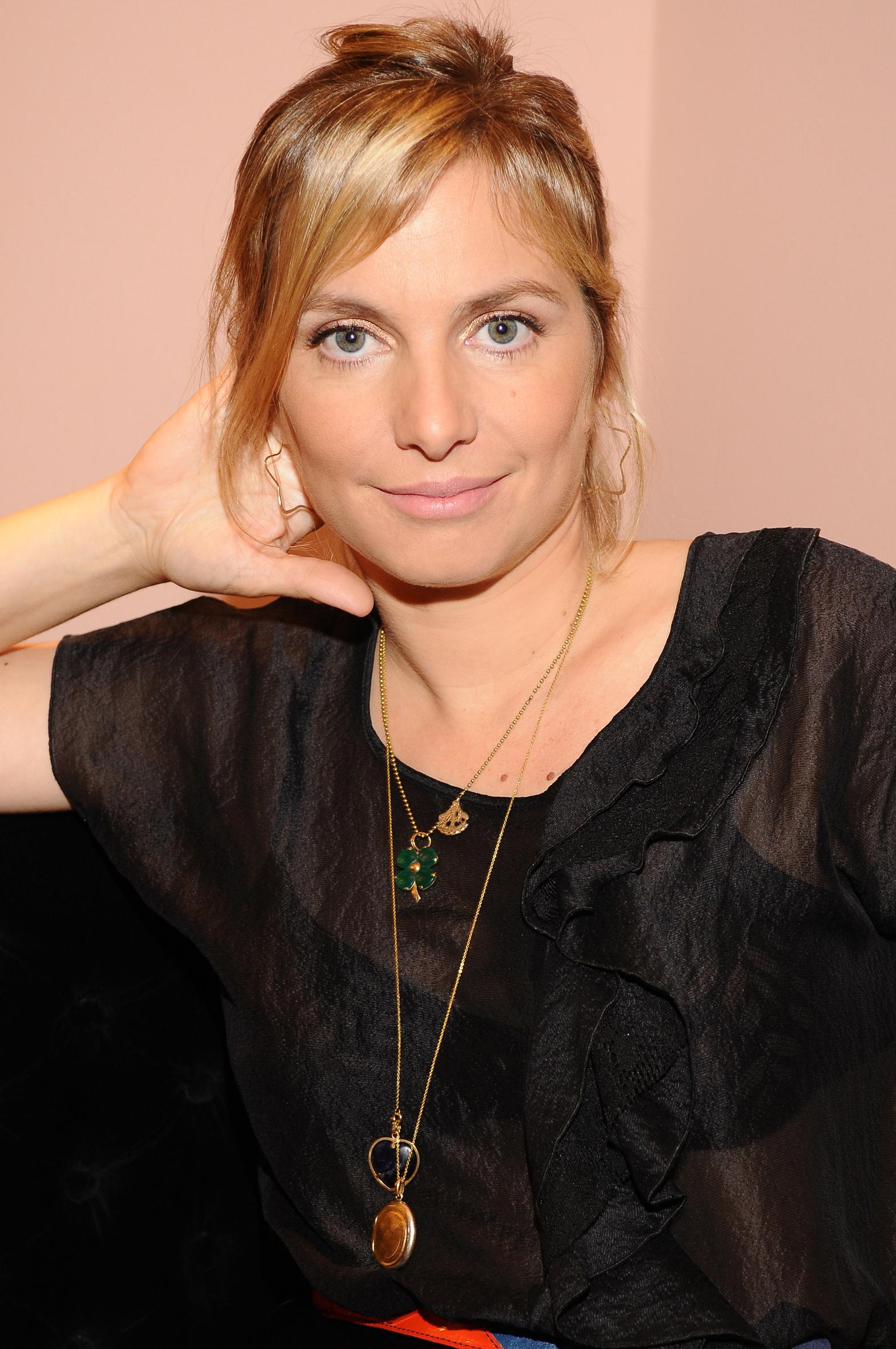
Jazmín Chebar

Jazmín Chebar (born 1973 in Buenos Aires) is an Argentine fashion designer. She owns an eponymous fashion line which retails "relaxed and formal clothes in a French-style boutique".

== Biography ==
Her parents owned the boutique "La Clocharde", a notable fashion landmark in Buenos Aires. After finishing school, Chebar moved to New York City, where she attended Parsons The New School for Design, obtaining degrees in Fashion Design and Fashion Merchandising in 1995. She then worked for Valentino and Donna Karan. Chebar created the costume design for Ashes of Paradise.

In March 1997, she opened her first store in Buenos Aires. Two years later, she opened a second store and began exporting to the United States. In 1999, she was a guest at the Paris Fashion Week. In March 2002, she began a partnership with the fashion entrepreneur Claudio Drescher to create exclusive stores in Latin America, including La Plata, Córdoba, Mendoza, as well as in Chile, Uruguay, Mexico, Paraguay, Peru, and Bolivia. In 2023, she launched an upcycle collection with Erica Vega.

The Telegraph tagged her "the Stella McCartney of BA".
