= Spahia (surname) =

Origin
- Language: Albanian via Turkish from Persian
- Meaning: descendant of a sipahi/cavalryman
- Region of origin: Albania

Other names
- Variant form: Spahija _{(Kosovo)}
- See also: Spahić, Sipahioğlu

Spahia is an Albanian surname. It is derived from the Turkish term sipahi (from Persian: سپاهی (sepāhī) with the meaning "soldier") for a cavalryman. People with the surname include:

- Ali Spahia (1935–2000), Albanian surgeon and politician
- Eqerem Spahia (born 1960), Albanian politician
- Halim Spahia (1897–1946), Albanian merchant and industrialist
- Sadik Spahia (born 1959), Albanian sculptor
