= Jasmin Forsyth =

Australian television presenter

Jasmin Geisel-Forsyth is an Australian television presenter, journalist, and former swimmer. She represented Australia in the 2000 FINA World Cup series, winning the silver in the 50m butterfly in Hong Konb and a bronze medal in the 100m freestyle in Hobart. She later became a television personality, appearing on the national children's television shows, Totally Footy and Totally Wild.

== Early life and education ==
Geisel attended Somerville House Girls School, and obtained a bachelor of journalism from the Queensland University of Technology (QUT).

From 1996 to 2000, she represented Australia in swimming. At the 2000 FINA World Cup no 5 in Hong Kong, she won the silver in the 50m butterfly. Later that year in the 2000 FINA World Cup no 6 in Hobart she won a bronze medal in the 100m freestyle.

== Career ==
Geisel's first television role was as the host of the children's television series, Totally Footy on Network Ten, later becoming a presenter on another of the channel's children's series, Totally Wild.

Geisel joined the Nine Network in 2006 as a journalist on regional programs, Extra and Weekend Extra. She also hosted the network's coverage of the 2008 & 2009 Qld Surf Life Saving Championships.

Geisel consults as the Media Manager for Swim Australia. She and her husband also have a media production company.

== Personal life ==
In 2007, she married cameraman, Chris Forsyth.
