= Jessamyn West =

Jessamyn West may refer to:

- Jessamyn West (writer) (1902–1984), American writer
- Jessamyn West (librarian) (born 1968), American librarian and blogger
