= Jasmina Mukaetova =

- Also known as: Jasmina
- Born: Jasmina Mukaetova; December 3, 1981 (age 44); Kavadarci, SFR Yugoslavia live in :New Jersey, USA
- Origin: Republic of Macedonia
- Genres: Folk music, pop
- Occupation: Singer
- Instrument: Voice
- Years active: 1998–present
- Website: http://www.jasminamukaetova.com.mk/index1.html/

Jasmina Mukaetova (Macedonian: Јасмина Мукаетова; born December 3, 1981, in Kavadarci) is a Macedonian turbo folk and popular music singer. In 2007, she conducted a world tour, performing in front of large diaspora audience.

Jasmina Mukaetova has been involved with the Macedonian folk scene for many years. So far, she has been very successful as a singer. She was born in Kavadarci, Republic of Macedonia, where she also completed her primary music education and High School studies. She attended the University of Philosophy in Skopje.

Her first singing experience was at the famous festival Pro fest, held in Probištip, where she was awarded 'the best newcomer' by the jury and the audience. In 2000, she participated in the Macedonian pre selection for the Eurovision Song Contest – as she was concentrating on a pop singing career at the time, until 2001, when she transformed into a folk music singer. After that, many worldwide tours followed, such as in Germany, Sweden, Switzerland, and Australia.
