= Jasmin Krejc =

Austrian footballer

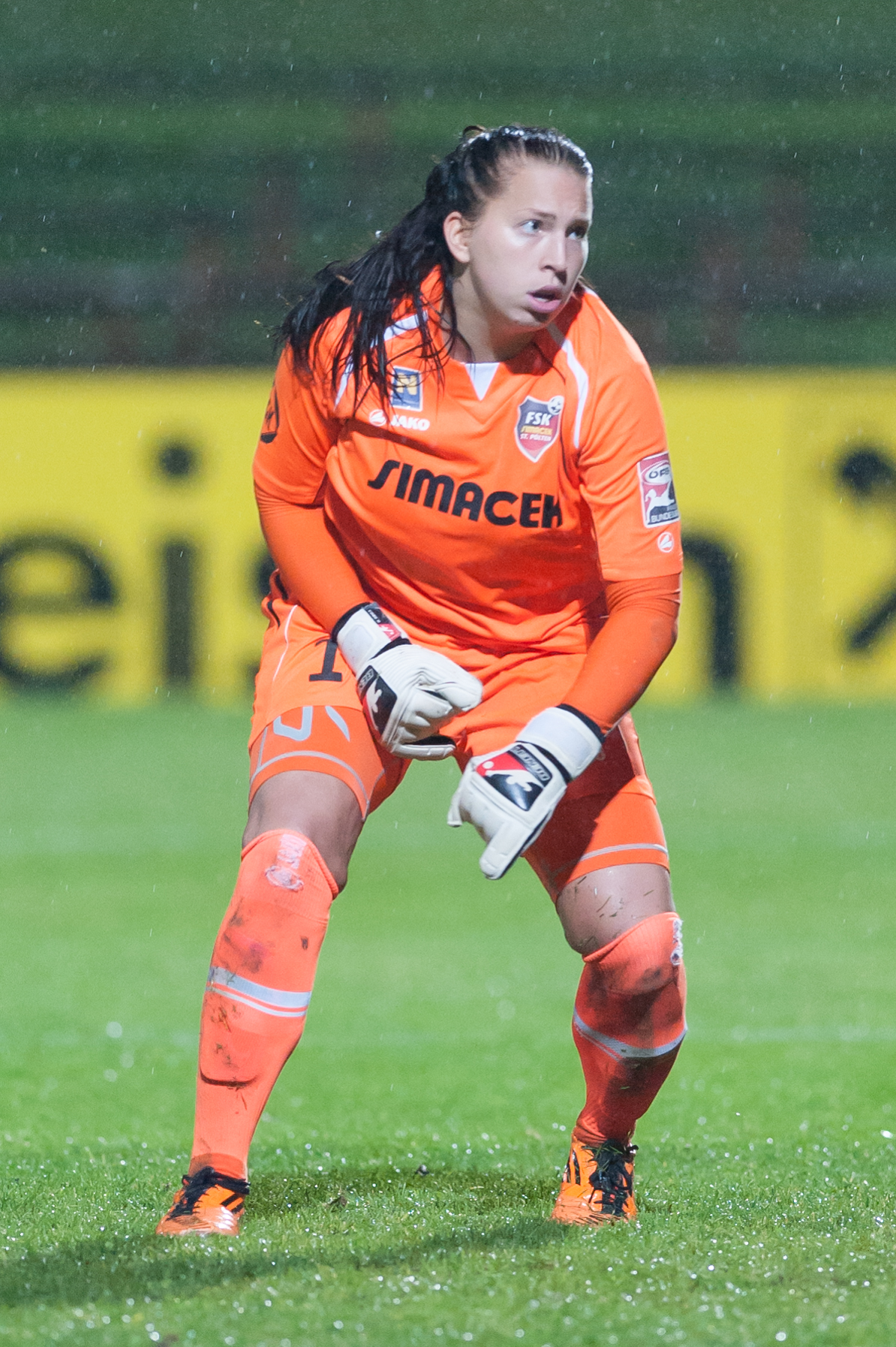

Personal information
- Full name: Jasmin Krejc
- Date of birth: 1 January 1992 (age 34)
- Place of birth: Austria
- Position: Goalkeeper

Team information
- Current team: SKN St. Pölten
- Number: 1

Senior career*
Years	Team	Apps	(Gls)
2010–	SKN St. Pölten	0	(0)

International career
- Austria
- * Club domestic league appearances and goals

Jasmin Krejc (born 1 January 1992) is an Austrian football goalkeeper, currently playing for SKN St. Pölten in the ÖFB-Frauenliga.

She is a member of the Austrian national team.
