= Jasmine (color) =

Color

Color coordinates
- Hex triplet: #F8DE7E
- sRGB^{B} (r, g, b): (248, 222, 126)
- HSV (h, s, v): (47°, 49%, 97%)
- CIELCh_{uv} (L, C, h): (89, 68, 71°)
- Source: ISCC-NBS
- ISCC–NBS descriptor: Light yellow
- B: Normalized to [0–255] (byte)

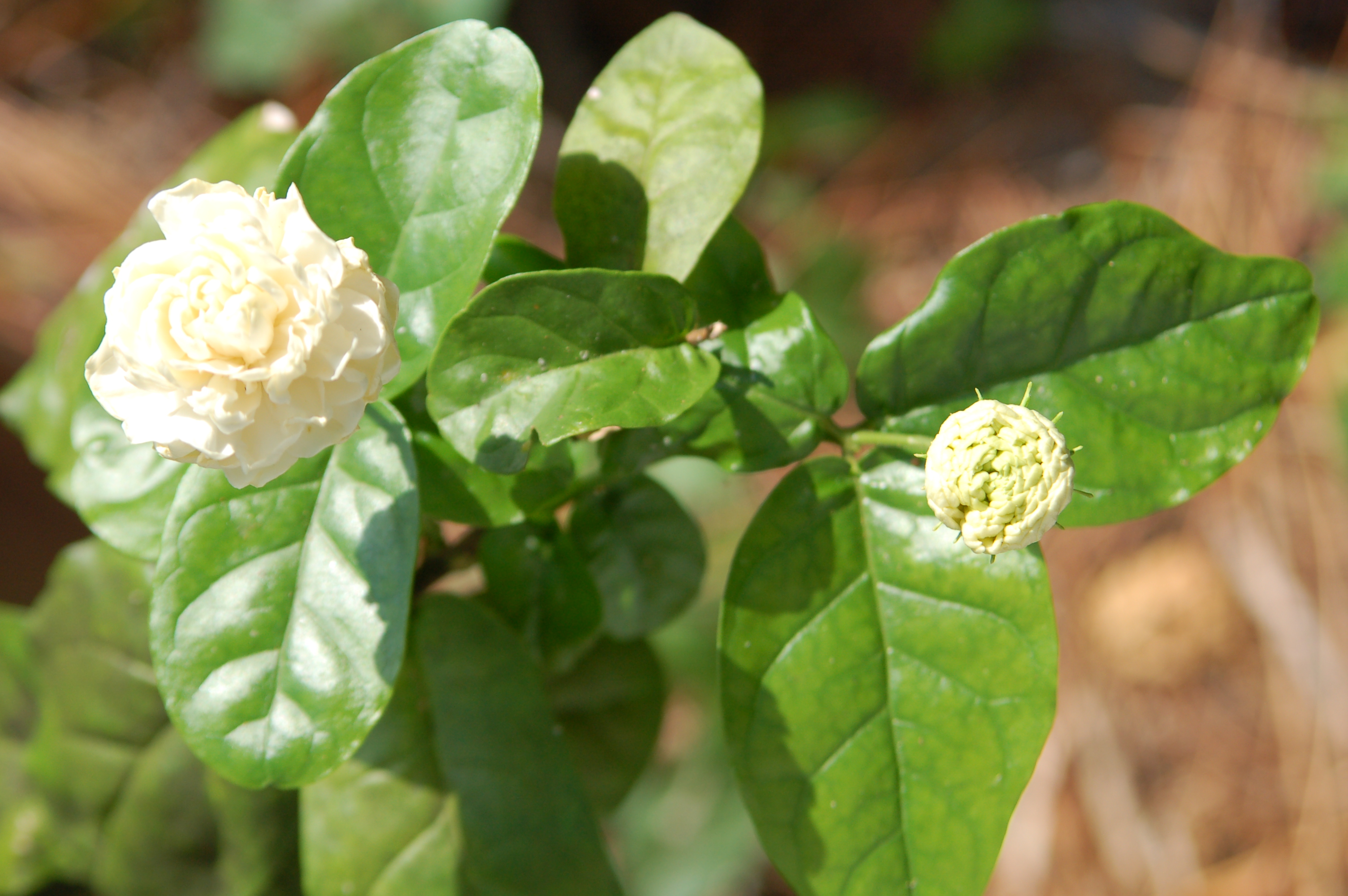
Example of jasmine: A double-flowered cultivar of Jasminum sambac in flower with an unopened bud. The flower smells like the tea as it opens.

The color jasmine is a pale tint of yellow, displayed at right. It is a representation of the average color of the more yellowish lower part of the pale yellowish white colored jasmine flower. The first recorded use of jasmine as a color name in English was in 1925.

== In human culture ==
=== Politics ===
- The 2010–2011 Tunisian revolution, also called the Jasmine Revolution, was a color revolution. It started as a campaign of civil resistance in Tunisia that began in December 2010. It is widely regarded as having initiated the Arab Spring. The reason it was called the "jasmine revolution" was because the jasmine is the national flower of Tunisia.

== See also ==
- List of colors
