= Jasmin Shokrian =

American fashion designer

Jasmin Shokrian is an American, Los Angeles–based artist, and fashion designer. Shokrian is known for her artistic sensibility and the sculptural lines of her clothes, which have become popular among art world figures like China Chow and Miranda July. In November 2014, she opened a month-long shop-in-shop inside the MOCA Store at the Museum of Contemporary Art, Los Angeles.

== Early life and education ==
Born and raised in L.A., Shokrian received her Bachelor in Fine Arts in film, sculpture and painting at the School of the Art Institute of Chicago.

== Career ==
She started her eponymous fashion label in 2003, and in 2005 she was the recipient of the fourth annual Ecco Domani Fashion Foundation Award for Womenswear Design. The award allowed her to present her first runway show at New York Fashion Week, for the Autumn/Winter 2005 collections, and her debut received praise from critics, including Cathy Horyn of the New York Times. She has since been covered by publications like Vogue, W and T: The New York Times Style Magazine, and she regularly shows her collections via film as part of Style.com's Video Fashion Week.

In 2008, she established Draft No. 17, an offshoot label focused on day-to-night basics priced more accessibly than her Atelier line, which utilized couture fabrics and was made entirely in-house. In Vanity Fair's 2009 Best Dressed List, Shokrian was mentioned by First Lady Michelle Obama as one of her favorite up-and-coming designers. The First Lady has also worn Shokrian's designs publicly, both in New York and at the White House. In 2010, Shokrian teamed up with the band OK Go as the costume designer for their "WTF" music video.

As part of her Spring/Summer 2014 collection, presented in September 2013, Jasmin Shokrian introduced her "Je Pars Habiter A Los Angeles" (I'm going to live in Los Angeles) T-shirt, a riff on the seemingly-sudden interest in L.A. among Parisians and other fashion types. The tongue-in-cheek slogan has since appeared on her tote bags, sweatshirts and first-ever men's items, and continues to drive interest in the brand.
