= Jazmín Mercado =

Ecuadorian footballer (born 1975)

Personal information
- Full name: Jazmín Elizabeth Mercado de la Cruz
- Date of birth: 1 October 1975 (age 51)
- Place of birth: Guayaquil, Ecuador
- Position: Midfielder

International career^{‡}
Years	Team	Apps	(Gls)
2003–2006	Ecuador	5	(0)
- ‡ National team caps and goals as of 10 November 2006

Jazmín Elizabeth Mercado de la Cruz (born 1 October 1975) is an Ecuadorian former footballer who played as a midfielder. She has been a member of the Ecuador women's national team.

== International career ==
Mercado capped for Ecuador at senior level during the 2006 South American Women's Football Championship.
