= Spahija =

Spahija is a Kosovo Albanian surname of Persian origin derived from the word spahi (سپاهی, sepâhi; horseman, soldier), that entered Albanian from the Turkish adaptation Sipahi (horseman, cavalryman). Notable people with the surname include:

- Hrvoje Spahija (born 1988), Croatian footballer
- Neven Spahija (born 1962), Croatian basketball coach

== See also ==
- Spahia (surname)
- Spahić
- Sipahioğlu
