= Jasmin Mansaray =

Finnish footballer (born 2004)

Personal information
- Date of birth: 27 December 2004 (age 21)
- Place of birth: Finland
- Position: Defender

Team information
- Current team: LSK Kvinner

Youth career
- HJK

Senior career*
| Years | Team | Apps | (Gls) |
| 2021–2024 | HJK | 37 | (1) |
| 2024–2025 | Inter Milan | 1 | (0) |
| 2025– | LSK Kvinner | 16 | (0) |

International career^{‡}
| 2020 | Finland U17 | 3 | (0) |
| 2021–2022 | Finland U19 | 7 | (0) |
| 2024– | Finland U23 | 3 | (0) |
| 2026– | Finland | 0 | (0) |
- * Club domestic league appearances and goals as of 22 April 2026 ‡ National team caps and goals as of 22 April 2026

Jasmin Mansaray (born 27 December 2004) is a Finnish professional footballer who plays as a defender for Toppserien club LSK Kvinner and the Finland national team.

== Career ==
Mansaray made her league debut for HJK Helsinki in top-tier Kansallinen Liiga on 17 April 2021. She suffered an acl injury on 5 February 2023, which kept her out for 12 months.

On 28 August 2024, Mansaray was announced at Inter Milan on a one-year contract, with an option to extend for another season. Three days later, she made her league debut in Serie A, in a 5–0 home win against Sampdoria.

In August 2025, she moved to Norwegian club LSK Kvinner.

== Honours ==
HJK

- Kansallinen Liiga runner-up: 2022
- Finnish Women's Cup runner-up: 2022
