= Jasmin Shojai =

Australian model

- Born: 21 July 1994 (age 32); Sydney

Jasmin Shojai (born 21 July 1994) is an Australian model and actor. She was named Australia's top glamour model for two consecutive years, 2017 and 2018.

== Early life ==
Shojai was born in Sydney and is of Persian and German ancestry.

== Career ==
Shojai got her first modeling job in October 2015. She was named Australia's top glamour model for two consecutive years, 2017 and 2018. She appeared in Playboy Croatia, for which she received "Playmate of the Month". She has appeared in FHM and Maxim magazines.

== Personal life ==
Shojai has spoken publicly about a former abusive relationship and the way she handled it.
