= Jasmin Siddiqui =

German multidisciplinary artist

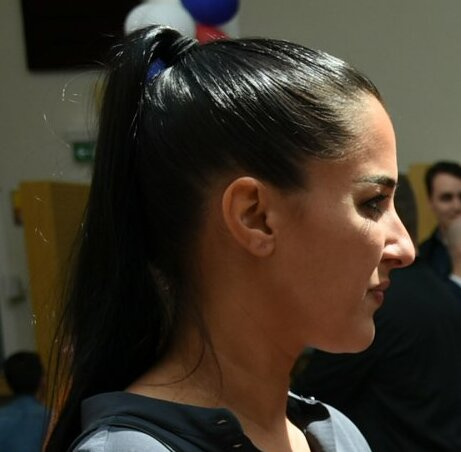
- Siddiqui in 2018
- Born: 1981 (age 44–45); Frankfurt, West Germany
- Other name: Hera
- Education: University of Applied Sciences Wiesbaden
- Known for: Street art, painting, illustration, Prints
- Notable work: Poetry Written in Fairy Language * An Ode To You * Love her but leave her wild * There is as much to learn as here is to teach * Smart Rats Have a Thousand Lives * I guess letting go
- Style: Multidisciplinary, narrative, gestural, satirical
- Movement: Street art, contemporary art, Murals

Jasmin Siddiqui is a German-born multidisciplinary artist. She is popularly known as Hera.

== Early, personal life and education ==
Siddiqui was born in Frankfurt, West Germany, in 1981. She was raised Catholic and Muslim, causing her to experience conflicts at school. She later coped with it as she came across graffiti.

Siddiqui has a classic art education that started when she was eight years old.

She studied Visual Communication and Graphic Design at the University of Applied Sciences in Wiesbaden.

== Art ==
Siddiqui’s works are characterized by gestural brushstrokes and use of mythological scenes. She combines traditional techniques and spray painting to portray comical and satirical scenes. Her works often tackle the human condition, childhood, injustice, and social awareness. Each of her works has a corresponding text to accompany the image.

=== Herakut ===
In 2004, Siddiqui collaborated with graffiti artist Akut (Falk Lehmann) to form Herakut. Since 2004, the street art duo has exhibited in art fairs and galleries around the world, has created more than 100 public murals, published two books; and are in major collections around the world. Their works are characterized by their narrative style, use of drippy paint technique and imagination.

== Selected works ==
- Poetry Written in Fairy Language
- An Ode To You
- Love her but leave her wild
- There is as much to learn as here is to teach
- Smart Rats Have a Thousand Lives
- I guess letting go
