= Jazmín Zepeda Burgos =

Mexican politician

- Born: 1 May 1976 (age 50); Mexico City, Mexico
- Occupation: Politician
- Political party: PRD

Jazmín Zepeda Burgos (born 1 May 1976) is a Mexican politician from the Party of the Democratic Revolution. From 2003 to 2006 she served as Deputy of the LIX Legislature of the Mexican Congress representing Guerrero.
