= Jasmin Bašić =

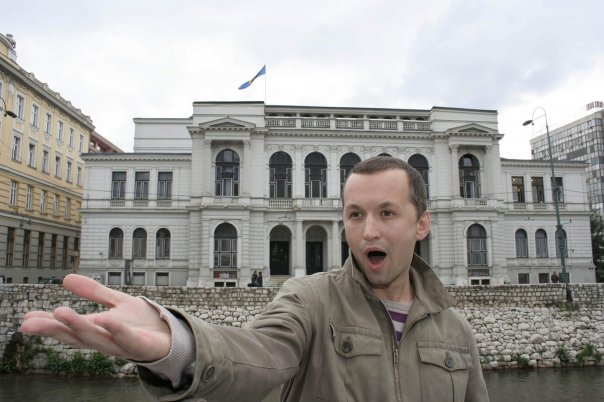

Background information
- Born: Jasmin Bašić; 7 December 1971 (age 54); Sarajevo, SR Bosnia and Herzegovina, Yugoslavia
- Genres: Classical Music, Opera, Cabaret, musical, les chansons françaises, Traditional Music – Sevdalinka
- Occupation: Opera singer
- Instrument: Voice
- Years active: 1994–present
- Website: National Theatre Sarajevo / Opera

Jasmin Bašić (born 7 December 1971) is a Bosnian tenor and author.

He graduated in 2003 and obtained his Master of Music Degree (Vocal performance and pedagogy) from University of Sarajevo in 2006 under famous and world's recognized soprano Radmila Bakočević Belgrade (Serbia).

Up to 2009, he specialized with the Wiener Staatsoper Kammersängerin Olivera Miljaković in Vienna (Austria). He is employed at the National Theatre Sarajevo as opera soloist and is recognized as vocal pedagogue. Apart from that he also held solo concerts, and has collaborated with Sarajevo Philharmonic Orchestra and Orchester Pons Artis from Vienna. In 2016. also jubilee opera season, he performed the duty of artistic director of the opera in Sarajevo.

== Opera repertoire ==
- Nabucco (Verdi) – Ismaele
- Eugene Onegin (Tschaikowsky) – Lenski
- Hasanaginica (Horozić) – Judge of Imotski
- Nikola Šubić Zrinski (opera) (Zajc) – Great Vesire
- The Magic Flute (Mozart) – Monostatos
- Don Giovanni (Mozart) – Don Ottavio
- Le nozze di Figaro (Mozart) – Basilio
- Bastien and Bastienne (Mozart) – Bastien
- Le convenienze ed inconvenienze teatrali (Viva la mamma) (Donizetti) - Stefano
- Carmen (Bizet) – Remendado
- Safikada (Insanić) – Asker
- The Hedgehog's Little House (Vauda) – Wolf (opera for children)
- Aska and The Wolf (Horozić) – Doctor Ovnovic (opera for children)
- La Traviata (Verdi) – Gaston de Letoriéres
- Rigoletto (Verdi) – Borsa

== Operatic repertoire ==
- Orpheus in the Underworld (Offenbach) – Jupiter
- The Merry Widow (Lehar) – Ambassador Zeta
- Die Csárdásfürstin (The Csárdás Princess) / (Kalman) – Graf Boni Kancianu
- Die Fledermaus (The Bat) / (Strauss) – Alfred

== Musical ==
- Cabaret (musical) (John Kander / Fred Ebb). Adaptation of the musical film "Cabaret" (1972) directed by Bob Fosse – The Emcee
- Annie (musical) (music by Charles Strouse, lyrics by Martin Charnin, and the book by Thomas Meehan) – Oliver "Daddy" Warbucks

== Bibliography ==
- Primadonna Gertruda Munitić. Museum of Literature & Performing Arts Sarajevo, 2017.
- Krunoslav Kruno Cigoj Museum of Literature & Performing Arts Sarajevo, Matica hrvatske Mostar, Croat Cultural Society Napredak Sarajevo, Croatian Academy of Sciences and Arts B&H, 2019.

== Concert repertoire ==
- L. van Beethoven – Fantasie in C-minor (Solo piano: Mo. Jörg Demus)
- J. Slavenski – Oriental Symphony
- A. Pavlič – Missa bosniensis

== Recordings ==
- CD (live recording) (tenor solo) – "Bosnian Te Deum"- oratorio (M. Katavić)

== Gallery ==
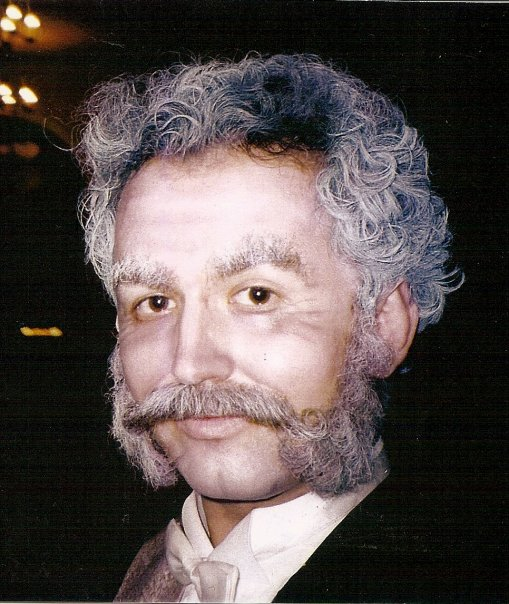
Jasmin Bašić as Ambassador Zeta

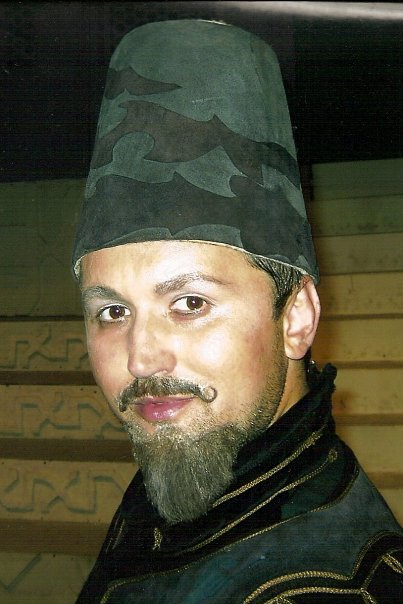
Jasmin Bašić as Judge of Imotski

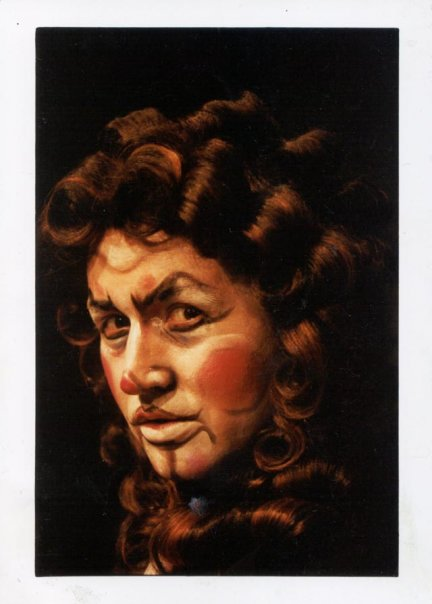
Jasmin Bašić

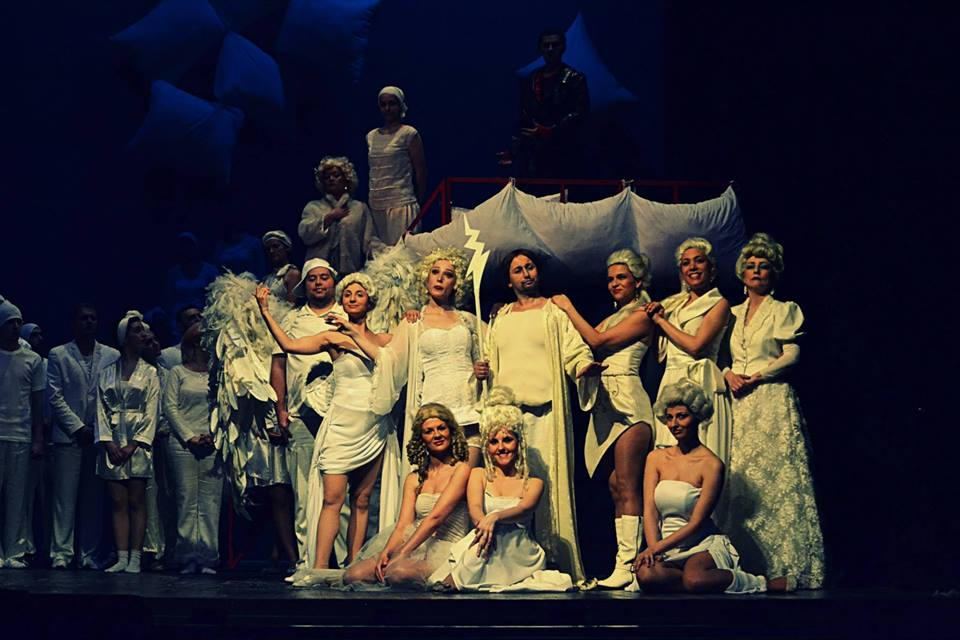
Jasmin Bašić as Jupiter

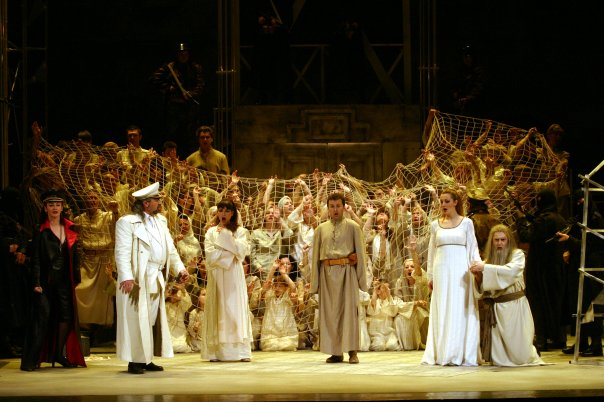
Jasmin Bašić as Ismael

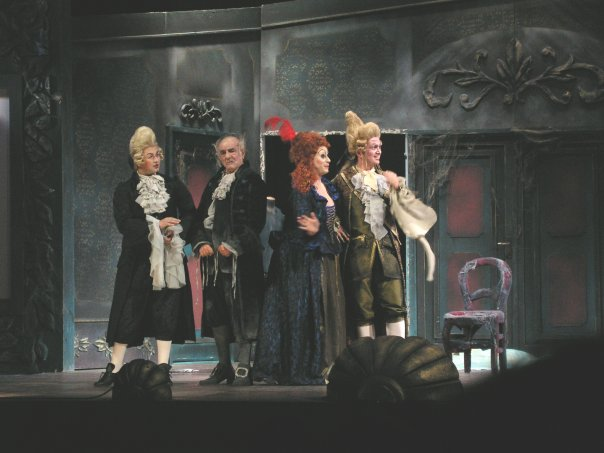
Jasmin Bašić as Basilio

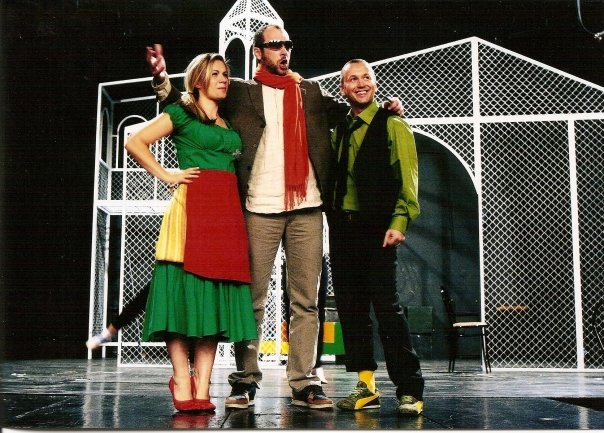
Jasmin Bašić as Bastien

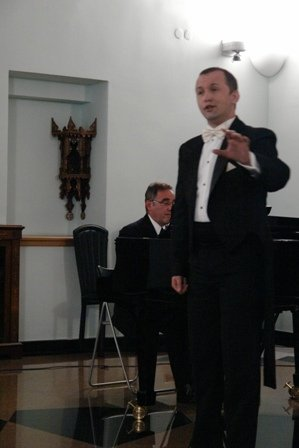
Jasmin Bašić in concert "Hommage a Tschaikovsky"

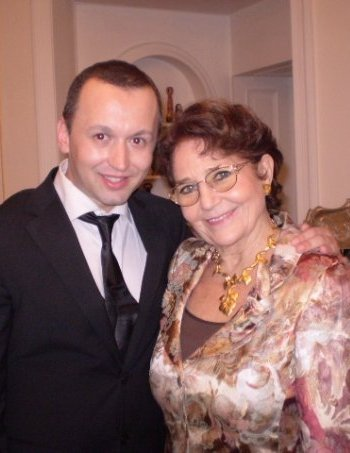
With Olivera Miljaković

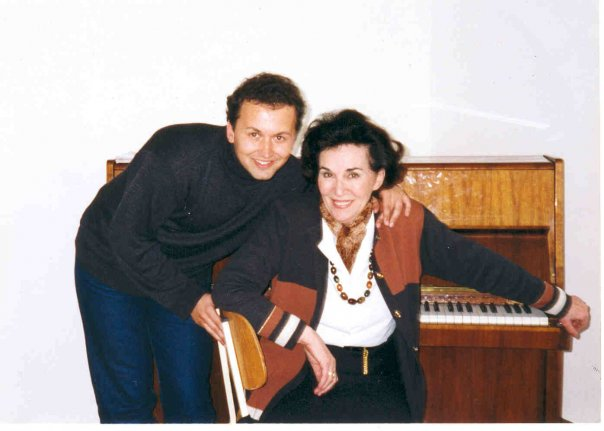
Radmila Bakočević
