= Jessamyn Fairfield =

American physicist

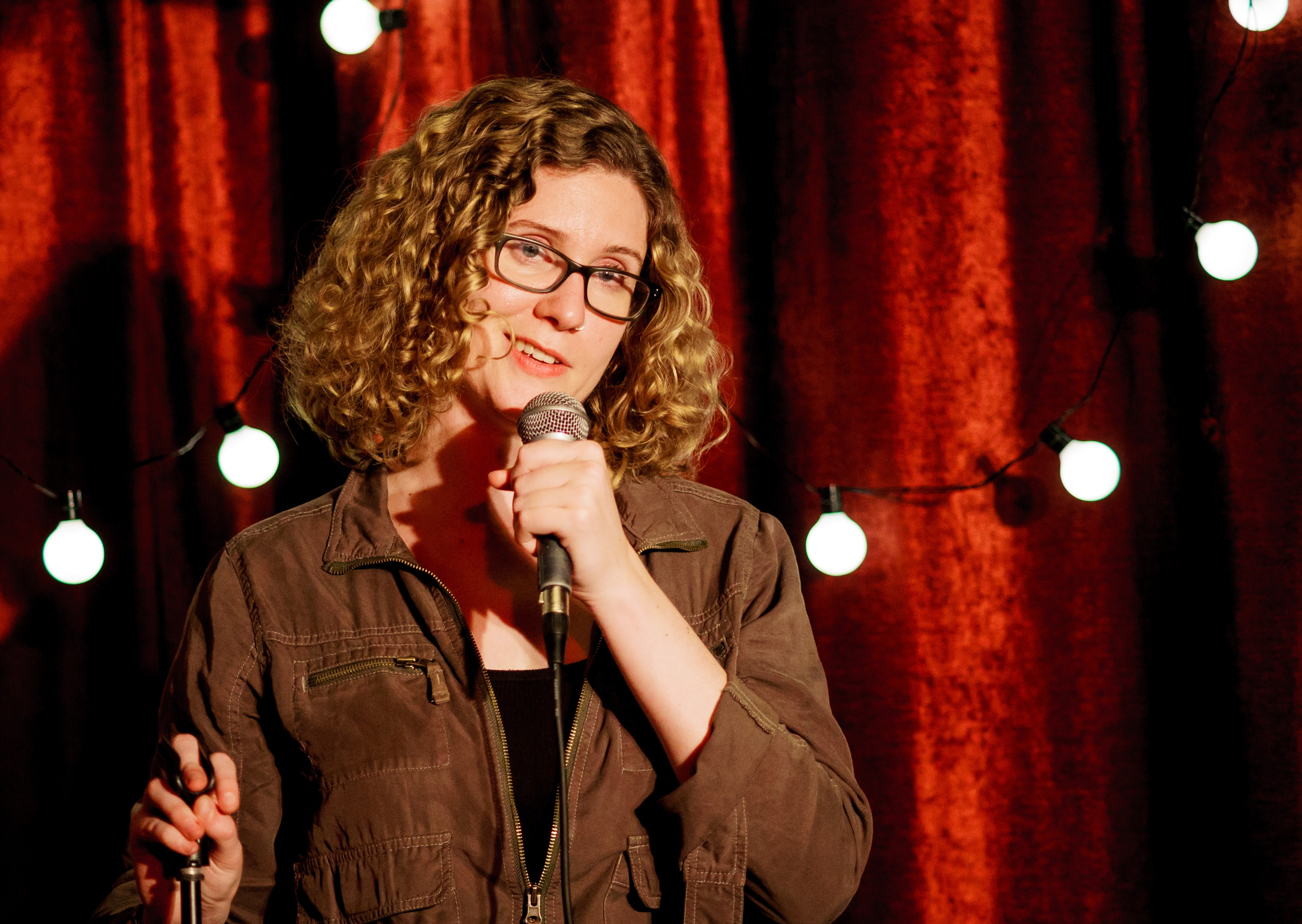
- Born: 13 October 1984 (age 42)
- Education: University of Pennsylvania University of California Berkeley
- Employer: NUI Galway

Jessamyn Fairfield (born 13 October 1984) is an American physicist who researches biocompatible nanomaterials and neuromorphic devices at NUI Galway.

== Early life and education ==
Fairfield earned a BA in physics and applied math at the University of California Berkeley in 2005, before an MSc and PhD in physics at the University of Pennsylvania in 2011. Her PhD dissertation is titled “Memory and Coupling in Nanocrystal Optoelectronic Devices”

== Research and career ==
After her PhD, Fairfield joined Trinity College Dublin as a research fellow. Her research focuses on nanomaterials, examining the optoelectronic properties of nanocrystals and nanowires. She is interested in neuromorphic materials, whose function mimics the synaptic connection of the brain. Alongside publishing in academic journals, she is a regular contributor to the popular science magazine Physics World.

In 2018, Fairfield completed a residency program in the Arctic Circle, where she worked on a project on the effects of climate change on humans. In 2019, she participated in the Homeward Bound leadership development program and Antarctic expedition during which she also studied climate change.

== Public engagement ==
Fairfield was the lead writer at DARTofPhysics, a campaign prompted a citywide discussion about physics through a series of adverts on public transport. In 2015, she joined Dublin's City of Physics program, acting as a blog editor and taking over management of Bright Club. She trains speakers and funds the initiative through Science Foundation Ireland. In 2016, she gave the Institute of Physics Summer Session, bringing researchers together with live music, to explore electronics and the brain. Fairfield brought Soapbox Science to Galway in 2017, bringing women in science to public spaces to talk about their research, and returned to organize its 2018 and 2019 events.

She is the science reporter for Newstalk's radio show "Futureproof". She gives regular public talks as well as appearing in newspapers and on television. In December 2017 she spoke at TEDxTUM in Munich.

== Awards ==
- 2017 – Institute of Physics Mary Somerville Medal
- 2013 – Institute of Physics Early Career Communicator Award
