= Jasmin Graham =

Conservation biologist and social justice activist

- Graham in 2024
- Website: https://www.learningwithjasmin.org/

Jasmin Graham is an American marine biologist known for her work in conservation and social justice, with a special focus on shark science. She is a co-founder of Minorities in Shark Sciences.

== Early life and education ==
Graham grew up in South Carolina, where she moved around the state due to her mother's service in the Air Force. Graham mainly lived in Myrtle Beach. She was first introduced to marine science in high school and encountered shark research in college. Graham has a B.S. in Marine Biology and a B.A. in Spanish from the College of Charleston. Graham received a Masters of Science (M.Sc.) in 2020 working with Dr. Dean Grubbs at Florida State University with a National Science Foundation graduate research fellowship.

== Career ==
Graham describes her work as a combination of conservation, shark science, communication, and social justice. Her research focused on smalltooth sawfish movement and hammerhead shark phylogeny. In 2021, The New York Times wrote an article that covered her research on the spatial extent of sawfish in the southeastern United States. She has received funding from the Save Our Seas Foundation for her work teaching the public about sharks. As of 2021, she worked at Mote Marine Laboratory as project coordinator for the Marine Science Laboratory Alliance Center of Excellence.

== Impact ==
Graham has spoken to the media on multiple aspects of shark research, including The Guardian, where she discusses the role of sharks as keystone predators in marine ecosystems. In 2020, Graham talked with New York Times about the use of squalene from sharks and noted that researchers should not be harangued as they create vaccines for the COVID-19 disease using this compound. She has also talked with The New York Times about the bad reputation earned by sharks, and the possibility that an opportunity to bet on shark migrations will bring increased visibility to shark research. Her conversations with The Washington Post were on the importance of shark nursery areas was a comment related to research from the University of Miami, and with National Geographic she talks about helping kids overcome their fear of sharks.

Graham works in social justice and seeks to increase diversity in the field of marine science. In 2020, with help from the Field School Foundation, Graham and Amani Webber-Schultz, Carlee Jackson, and Jaida Elcock hosted a meeting that led to the foundation of Minorities in Shark Sciences, an organization that aims to help people overcome the challenges associated with entering marine science. Graham has talked with NBC News about the lack of diversity in Shark Week, and its portrayal of white men as the only people working on shark research. Subsequently it was announced that National Geographic will collaborate with Minorities in Shark Sciences during the 2022 Shark Week to encourage diversity and inclusion in the field. During a 2020 interview with Sylvia Earle with the Ocean Elders group where Graham talked about her work engaging the public about endangered sawfish, hammerhead sharks, and making an impact in marine sciences. Graham was a panelist in the 2021 panel on women and girls in the Ocean Decade hosted by UNESCO, where she discussed her work broadening the diversity of voices being heard in marine science.

Graham has been interviewed about her work by multiple people, including interviews with Neil deGrasse Tyson on his StarTalk show, National Public Radio, Skype a Scientist, the Ologies podcast, Science on Tap, Sharks4Kids, other podcasts, and interviews. She has also been a judge for a photo contest hosted by the Ocean Conservancy.

== Awards and honors ==
Graham won the World Wildlife Federation's 2021 Conservation Leadership Award. In 2025, she was the top prize winner in the category Research Scientist: Early Career of the National Academies Eric and Wendy Schmidt Award for Excellence in Science Communications.

== Selected Publications ==
- Graham, J; Kroetz, Am; Poulakis, Gr; Scharer, Rm; Carlson, Jk; Lowerre-Barbieri, S; Morley, D; Reyier, Ea; Grubbs, Rd (2021-01-28). "Large-scale space use of large juvenile and adult smalltooth sawfish Pristis pectinata: implications for management". Endangered Species Research. 44: 45–59. Bibcode:2021ESRes..44...45G. doi:10.3354/esr01088. ISSN 1863-5407.
- Graham, Jasmin; Kroetz, Andrea M.; Poulakis, Gregg R.; Scharer, Rachel M.; Carlson, John K.; Lowerre-Barbieri, Susan K.; Morley, Danielle; Reyier, Eric A.; Grubbs, R. Dean (15 February 2022). "Commercial fishery bycatch risk for large juvenile and adult smalltooth sawfish ( Pristis pectinata ) in Florida waters". Aquatic Conservation: Marine and Freshwater Ecosystems. 32 (3): 401–416. Bibcode:2022ACMFE..32..401G. doi:10.1002/aqc.3777. ISSN 1052-7613. S2CID 246916990.
- Graham, Jasmin; Caceres, Camila; Santos de Azevedo Menna, Deborah (November 10, 2022). Minorities in Shark Sciences: Diverse Voices in Shark Research. CRC Press. ISBN 9781000775563.
- Graham, Jasmin; Hodsdon, Gina; Busse, Aly; Crosby, Michael P. (2023-07-03). "BIPOC voices in ocean sciences: A qualitative exploration of factors impacting career retention". Journal of Geoscience Education. 71 (3): 369–387. Bibcode:2023JGeEd..71..369G. doi:10.1080/10899995.2022.2052553. ISSN 1089-9995.
- Graham, Jasmin (2024-07-16). Sharks Don't Sink. New York: Pantheon. ISBN 978-0-593-68525-9.
