= Yasemin Besen-Cassino =

American sociologist

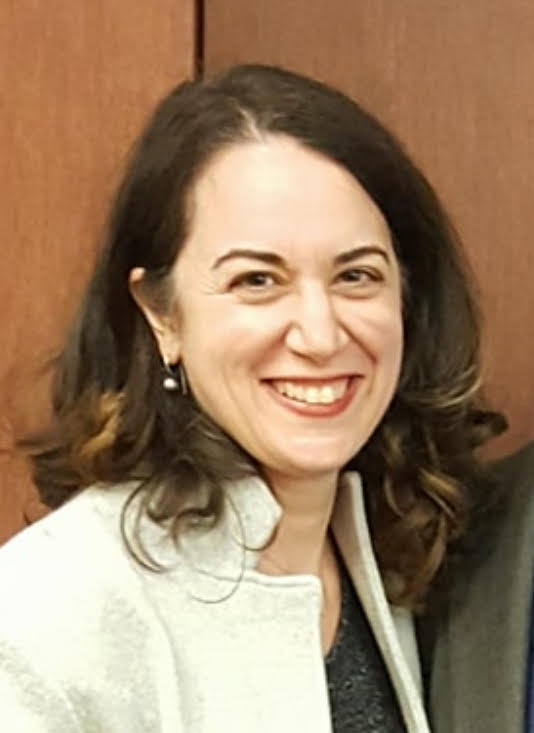
- Born: Istanbul, Turkey
- Spouse: Dan Cassino

Academic background
- Education: BA, Boğaziçi University; MA, PhD, 2005, Stony Brook University
- Thesis: Consumption of production: why do teenagers work in the United States? (2005)

Academic work
- Institutions: Montclair State University

Yasemin Besen-Cassino (born 1978) is an American sociologist. She is a professor of sociology at Montclair State University and editor for Contemporary Sociology. Besen-Cassino is married to political scientist Dan Cassino and the two often collaborate on research projects.

== Early life and education ==
Besen-Cassino was born on December 27, 1978, in Istanbul, Turkey to two working parents. She earned her Bachelor of Arts degree in sociology from Boğaziçi University before moving to North America for her graduate degrees at Stony Brook University.

== Career ==
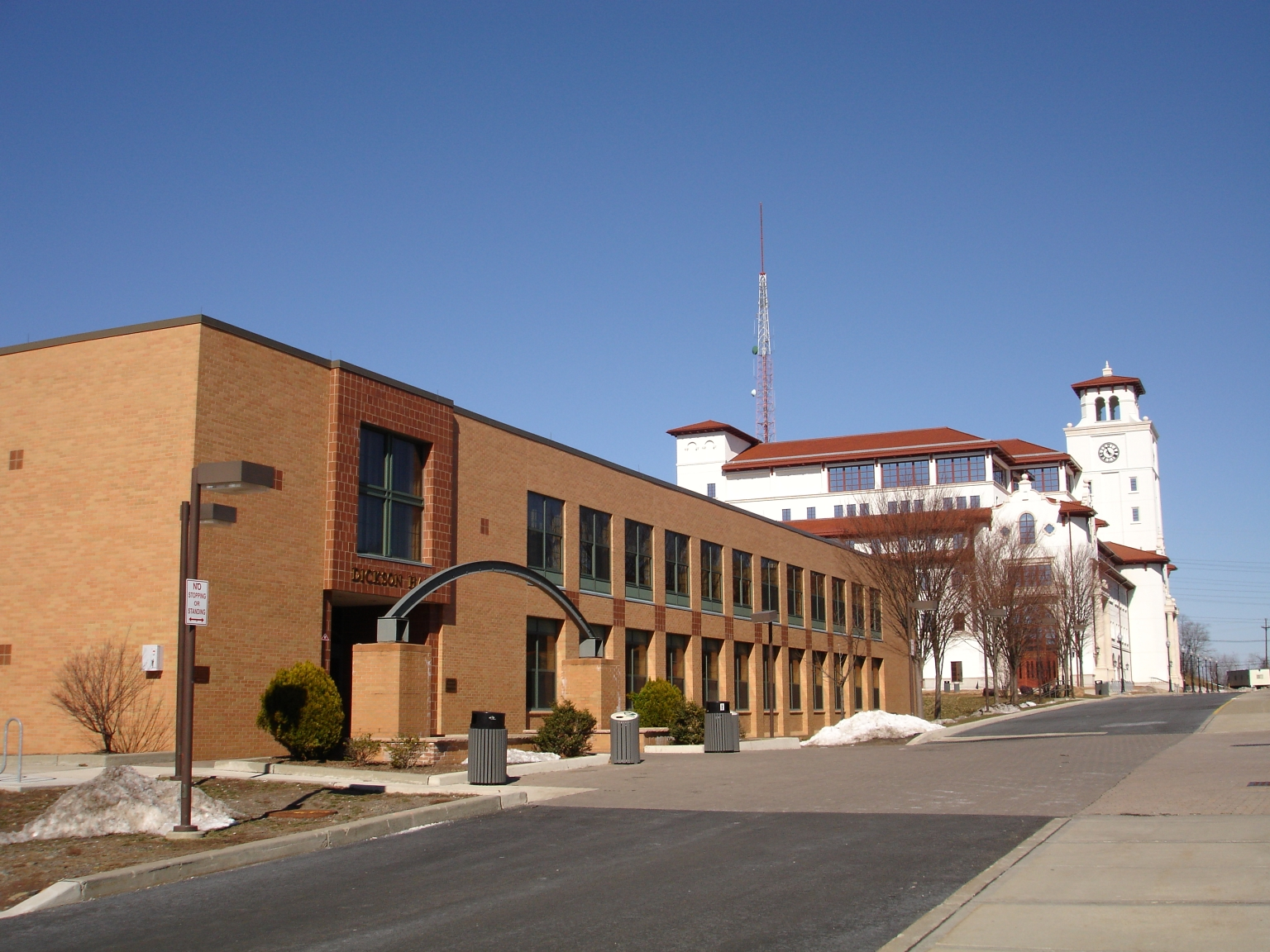
A photo of Dickson Hall, which houses the Sociology Department

Following her PhD, Besen-Cassino immediately joined the Sociology Department at Montclair State University where she specialized in teaching about gender and youth. Alongside her husband, political scientist Dan Cassino, they co-authored Consuming Politics: Jon Stewart, Branding, and the Youth Vote in America in 2009 through the Fairleigh Dickinson University Press. The book, which is based during the 2008 United States presidential election, studied how modern youth viewed politics differently than their ancestors. Through hundreds of in-depth interviews and telephone surveys, they concluded that voting-aged youth in 2008 saw politics "in the same way that they see consumer goods and brands." In the same year, Besen-Cassino also testified in support of the Lilly Ledbetter Fair Pay Act of 2009.

Besen-Cassino published her first ethnographic book through Temple University Press in 2014 titled Consuming Work: Youth Labor in America. In Consuming Work, she releases her findings of the workforce within an upscale coffee shop who "seek to hire "cool people" with the "right vibe." Besen-Cassino argued that such low paying and exploitative jobs were only considered such by outside forces, such as adults, but welcomed by working youth. She also argues that work itself has become "a branded experience to be consumed by young people," as affluent youth wish to work to associate themselves with a brand rather than for a pay cheque.

Besen-Cassino followed her first book up with another titled The Cost of Being a Girl: Working Teens and the Origins of the Gender Wage Gap, which examined the experiences of young women compared to their male counterparts. In this book, she explores how the Gender pay gap begins once children turned 14 or 15 and began diverting from freelance jobs to employee-type jobs. She also found that when youth begin babysitting, girls were more often asked to stay later or do extra chores because they were seen as "natural caretakers." As such, when children enter the workforce, their expectations of work versus pay were different and women were expected to do more work for less pay.

In 2019, Besen-Cassino was appointed editor for Contemporary Sociology, having previously served as managing editor of Men and Masculinities and sat on the editorial board of Contexts. In the same year, Besen-Cassino and her husband published a study which found that Black women were more likely to report sexual harassment in the workplace than white women. However, their research also showed that African American women were more likely to experience harassment compared to white women.

== Selected publications ==
- Social Research Methods by Example: Applications in the Modern World (2017)
- The Cost of Being a Girl: Working Teens and the Origins of the Gender Wage Gap (2017)
- Consuming Work: Youth Labor in America (2014)
- Research Methods by Example (2014)
- Consuming Politics: Jon Stewart, Branding, and the Youth Vote in America (2009)
