= Jazmin Hiaya =

Jazmín Hiaya (late 10th century to 1030s) (Arabic: جازمين حيية) was the only Arab military governor of the Taifa of Talavera de la Reina.

Jazmín was probably born to an Almohad tribe in Northern Africa. He was the military governor and king of the Taifa of Talavera de la Reina, in Castilla-La Mancha, Spain in the early 11th century.

According to legend, when he was a young boy, he had been promised that he would marry Princess Aixa Galiana, niece of Yahya al-Qadir, who was the last king of Toledo before the conquest of Alfonso VI. Aixa Galiana was captured by Christians and taken to Ávila, where she would be christened and married to the young Nalvillos Blázquez from the lineage of Davila's of then emerge D. Álvaro de Luna. In a business visit, in which he was to deliver the price of land to the family of Blázquez, Jazmín saw his former fiancée, and they both fell in love with each other. Taking advantage of the absence of Blázquez who was in Villar del Pedroso, they fled back to Talavera de la Reina.

When Blázquez returned to Avila and discovered the betrayal, he gathered three hundred squires and headed to Talavera. According to several sources, Jazmin Hiaya was betrayed by Aixa. And according to others, Blázquez besieged the city, arrested Jazmín and Axia, and executed them on the spot.
