= Yasemin Akat =

Turkish fashion designer (born 1956)

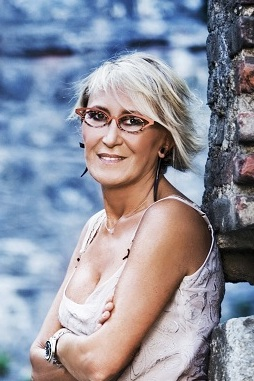
- Yasemin Akat in 2010
- Born: 15 April 1956 (age 70); Gaziantep, Turkey
- Occupation: Fashion designer
- Website: Official website

Yasemin Akat (born 15 April 1956) is a Turkish fashion designer.

Akat was born in 1956 in Gaziantep and spent her early years working on sculptures and paintings. Her family did not let her pursue a career in fashion designing, but after 23 years Akat founded her first model atelier in 2001 in Arnavutköy, Istanbul.

In 2002, she started working as Ajda Pekkan's stylist for three years and kept that position for three years. She later created her own brand and started selling her products at her stores in Istanbul. She is known for her love of Haute Couture, which often appears in her designs. Sezen Aksu, Zuhal Olcay, İpek Tuzcuoğlu, Tuba Büyüküstün, and Deniz Çakır are among Turkish celebrities who have worn outfits by her brand.

Yasemin Akat, who blends ethnic elements with modern designs, draws attention to the use of many different fabrics in her designs. She has represented her country at fashion fairs in Paris, London, Milan, New York, Barcelona, Berlin, Moscow and Copenhagen, and her collections have been sold in many places around Europe and Middle East.

Aside from designing for her own brand, Akat has worked with a number of English and Italian fashion houses as well.

On 11 August 2011, Irish singer and songwriter Laura Mulligan, was chosen as the "Best Dressed Woman" during the Kilbeggan Horse Races. Her outfit for the competition was prepared by Yasemin Akat.
