= Jasmin Nejati =

Swedish footballer

Personal information
- Full name: Jasmin Nejati
- Date of birth: 4 March 1994 (age 32)
- Place of birth: Sweden
- Height: 1.69 m (5 ft 7 in)
- Position: Defender

Senior career*
Years	Team	Apps	(Gls)
2011–2020	Umeå IK	95	(1)

International career
2013	Sweden U19	1	(0)
- * Club domestic league appearances and goals as of 31 January 2020

Jasmin Nejati (born 4 May 1994) is a Swedish footballer who played for Umeå IK in the Damallsvenskan.
