= Jasmin Staiblin =

German manager (born 1970)

- Born: March 1, 1970 (age 56); Endingen am Kaiserstuhl, Germany
- Education: Karlsruhe Institute of Technology, Royal Technical College in Stockholm
- Occupation: CEO of the Swiss energy group Alpiq (2013-2018)

Jasmin Staiblin (born 1 March 1970) is a German executive. She was the CEO of the Swiss energy group Alpiq 2013-2018. She was also the CEO of ABB Switzerland from 2006 to 2012.

== Early life and education ==
Jasmin Staiblin, daughter of Gerdi Stabilin, who was the former vice-president of the German Rural Woman's Association and Minister for Food and Rural Affairs in the Baden-Württemberg state government, grew up on a winery in Königschaffhausen am Kaiserstuhl. Her father Helmut Staiblin was cellarmaster of the local winegrowers' cooperative in Königschaffhausen. During her childhood she saw her parents taking part in the resistance against the construction of the nuclear power plant in the neighboring village of Wyhl in 1975. Staiblin attended the Technical High School at the Gewerbliche und Hauswirtschaftlich-Sozialpflegerische Schulen in Emmendingen (GHSE). She studied electrical engineering and physics at the Technical University in Karlsruhe and the Royal Technical College in Stockholm. Her diploma thesis completed at KTH was awarded the "European University Award".

== Career ==
From 1997, she worked as a research assistant at the ABB Research Center Dättwil and in 1999, became Sales Manager at ABB Hochspannungstechnik in Oerlikon. After taking over the portfolio management and business development for the medium-voltage products division of the ABB Group in Zürich in 2000, she became a member of the management of the global ABB electrical engineering division in 2004, and in 2006, she became the country's chief executive of ABB Switzerland in Baden AG. She held the post until 2012.

In 2009, Staiblin, as CEO of ABB, took 16 weeks of maternity leave, causing controversy in Switzerland. In addition to the tabloid Blick, the editor of Die Weltwoche, Roger Köppel, complained, that no man in a comparable position could afford to leave his job for personal reasons. Shortly after she joined Alpiq as CEO, it became known that Staiblin was expecting her second child.

In 2012, the Board of Directors of Alpiq Holding AG appointed her as CEO of Alpiq effective as of 1 January 2013. She resigned at the end of 2018. Her contract ran for another 12 months, for which she was released. For that year, she received total compensation of CHF 1.9 million.

From 2012 to 2021 Staiblin was a member of the Board of Directors of Rolls-Royce plc. On 11 June 2021, she was appointed Chairwoman of the Supervisory Board of Rolls-Royce Power Systems AG and MTU Friedrichshafen GmbH.

In 2016 Staiblin, CEO of Alpiq, was forced to justify the drastic reduction of its hydropower portfolio with the non-competitive production costs of hydropower and would not exclude the possible sale of hydropower plants to a Chinese state-owned company.

== Memberships ==
- 2007: Member of the board of directors of Neue Aargauer Bank
- 2007: Vice president of Energie Trialog Schweiz
- 2008-2013: Member of the executive committee of Swissmem
- 2008-2012; 2014-2018: Board member of Economiesuisse
- 2011-2023: Member of the board of directors of Georg Fischer (Swiss company)
- 2012: Member of the board of directors of Rolls-Royce Holdings
- 2012: Board member of ETH Zurich
- 2012-2017: Vice President Swisselectric
- 2012-2016: Director of ETH Board
- 2015: Independent Non-Executive Director of Rolls-Royce Holdings
- 2019: Independent Non-Executive Director of NXP Semiconductors N.V.
- 2019: Director of Zurich Insurance Group Ltd.
- 2020: Board member of Zap Energy

== Awards and nominations ==
- SwissAward 2007, Category Economy. (Nomination)
- Young Global Leader 2008, World Economic Forum

== Literature ==
- Jasmin Staiblin, in the Munzinger-Archiv
