= Jazmin Truesdale =

- Occupations: Entrepreneur; Writer
- Website: jazmintruesdale.com

Jazmin Truesdale (born December 6, 1987) is the writer and creator of AZA comics, a comic book that features diverse female characters.

== Early life and education ==
Jazmin Truesdale was born in Durham, North Carolina. She earned a degree in pre-medicine and exercise science from the University of North Carolina at Chapel Hill in 2009 and an MBA from the Florida Institute of Technology.

== Career and AZA comics ==
Truesdale is the creator of Jazmin Fitness and AZA Comics, a comic book that features female characters of diverse backgrounds. Truesdale recruited illustrator Remero Colston for the project after finding him on Instagram. AZA Comics' first graphic novel, Keepers: Origins, was published digitally in 2016.
