= Jasminka Domaš =

Croatian writer

- Born: 5 September 1948 (age 77); Banja Luka, PR Bosnia and Herzegovina, FPR Yugoslavia
- Education: University of Zagreb
- Occupations: Writer, journalist, scientist

Jasminka Domaš (born 5 September 1948, Banja Luka) is a Croatian-Jewish writer, journalist and scientist.

Domaš was born in Banja Luka and graduated from the Faculty of Political Sciences at the University of Zagreb. Domaš is a master of biblical and modern Judaism, and specialises in such issues as national minorities and interfaith relations. She is an associate of many national and international magazines. In the area of Judaism, she has published more than three hundred articles. Domaš is also the guest lecturer at the Jesus Society, Faculty of Humanities and Social Sciences, University of Zagreb. Since 1995 to 1998, Domaš made more than two hundred documentary testimonials for the Shoah Foundation, whose founder and president is Steven Spielberg.

She is a member of the World Conference of Religions for Peace, PEN Croatia and Croatian Writers Society. Domaš was an active member of the Jewish community in Zagreb until its split. She is an active member of the Beth Israel Jewish community. Domaš is also active in the Jewish cultural society "Miroslav Šalom Freiberger", Croatian Helsinki Committee and Association for Religious Freedom in Croatia, where she is the president. Domaš works at the Croatian Radiotelevision as a journalist.

== Published works ==
- Obitelj – Mišpaha, Novi Liber, 1996
- Tjedne minijature slobode , 1997
- Šabat šalom, 1999
- Biblijske priče – prinos razumijevanju biblijskih značenja, Jewish community Zagreb, 2000
- Rebeka u nutrini duše, Jewish community Zagreb, 2001
- Židovska meditacija – istraživanje mističnih staza judaizma, Misl, 2003

=== Obitelj – Mišpaha ===
Book Obitelj – Mišpaha, was published by the Jewish cultural society "Miroslav Šalom Freiberger" and publisher Novi Liber, Zagreb in 1996. In 2002 Croatian Cultural Center from Eisenstadt, with the support from the Austrian Federal Government and provincial Burgenland government, has published the book in German and English. In the book, Domaš researched the history and present of the Jewish community in Croatia, its deep roots in the culture, economic and spiritual life of Croatia and Europe.

=== Biblijske priče – prinos razumijevanju biblijskih značenja ===
Biblijske priče – prinos razumijevanju biblijskih značenja, was published in 2000 by Jewish cultural society "Miroslav Šalom Freiberger" and Jewish community Zagreb. With credible sources and interpretations, the book reveals the true depth meaning of the biblical stories.

=== Rebeka u nutrini duše ===
Rebeka u nutrini duše was published by the Jewish cultural society "Miroslav Šalom Freiberger" in Zagreb in 2001. It was later published in Italian and German in 2003. The novel explores the fate of Jews in the Holocaust, but also includes other important questions about humanity.

=== Židovska meditacija – istraživanje mističnih staza judaizma ===
Židovska meditacija – istraživanje mističnih staza judaizma was published in 2003. The book provides an overview of different meditation techniques to the interpretation of many concepts of Jewish mysticism. The book has a kabbalistic vocabulary.

== Bibliography ==
- Kraus, Ognjen (1998). Dva stoljeća povijesti i kulture Židova u Zagrebu i Hrvatskoj. Zagreb: Židovska općina Zagreb. ISBN 953-96836-2-9.
