= Jasmin Darznik =

American author

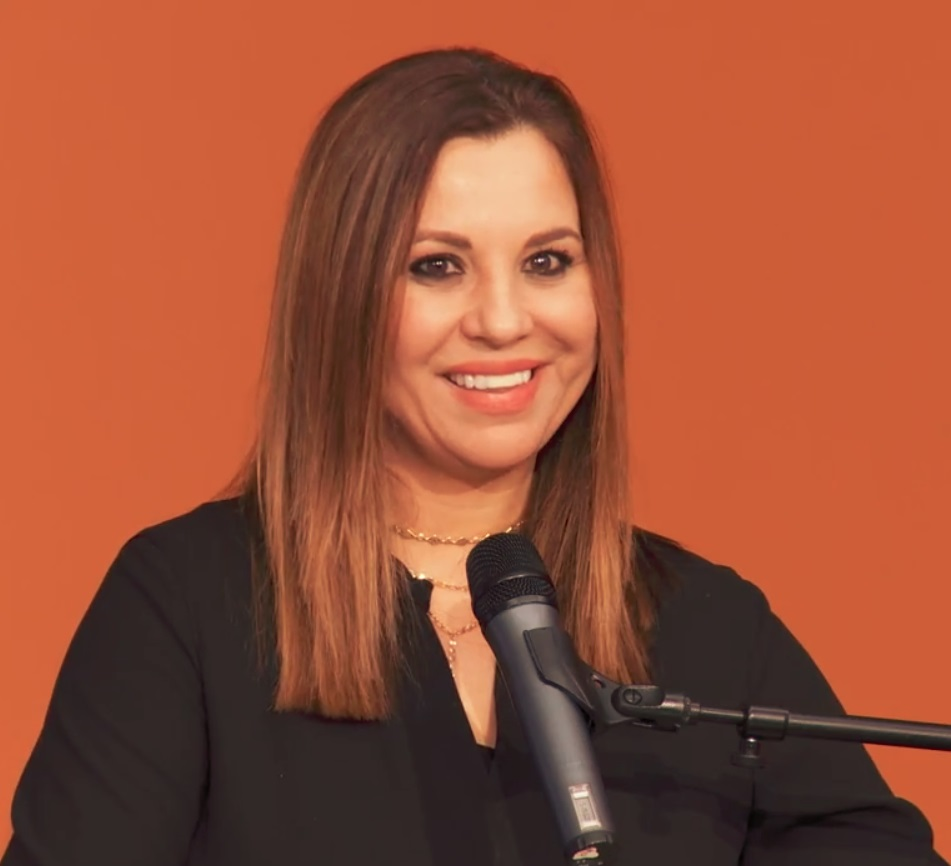
- Jasmin Darznik discusses her work in 2018
- Born: Imperial State of Iran
- Education: University of California, Los Angeles (BA); University of California, Hastings (JD); Princeton University (PhD); Bennington College (MFA)
- Occupation: Writer
- Employer: California College of the Arts
- Website: jasmindarznik.com

Jasmin Darznik is a novelist and academic. She is the New York Times bestselling author of four books: the memoir The Good Daughter: A Memoir of My Mother's Hidden Life, and the novels Song of a Captive Bird, The Bohemians, and the forthcoming American Goddess (2027), set in old Hollywood.

Her debut novel, Song of a Captive Bird (2018), inspired by the life of Forugh Farrokhzad, Iran's celebrated poet, was a New York Times Book Review "Editors' Choice" selection and a Los Angeles Times bestseller. The New York Times praised it as a "complex and beautiful rendering of [a] vanished country and its scattered people; a reminder of the power and purpose of art; and an ode to female creativity under a patriarchy that repeatedly tries to snuff it out."

The Bohemians (2021), which imagines the early life of photographer Dorothea Lange in 1920s San Francisco, was featured among 2021's best books of historical fiction by the New York Times and selected by Oprah Daily as one of the best historical novels of the year.

The Good Daughter became a New York Times bestseller and was described by Kirkus Reviews as "an eye-opening account that disturbs with its depiction of the place of women in Iranian society, but warms the heart in its portrayal of their gritty endurance."

Darznik's books have been published in nineteen countries, and her essays have appeared in the New York Times, Washington Post, and Los Angeles Times, among other publications.

== Biography ==
Early life and education

Darznik was born in Iran and came to the United States at the age of five. She graduated summa cum laude completing a BA at the UCLA in 1994 and completed a JD at the University of California, San Francisco in 1997. She would complete a PhD (English literature) at Princeton University in 2008 and an MFA (Fiction) at Bennington College in 2014.

Academic career

Darznik is chair of the MFA program in writing at California College of the Arts in San Francisco. She previously taught at Princeton University, Washington and Lee University, University of Virginia, and University of San Francisco.

== Awards ==
Darznik is a recipient of a 2012 fellowship from the Virginia Foundation for the Humanities and an Outstanding Faculty Award from the State Council of Higher Education for Virginia. She has received fellowships from the Steinbeck Fellows Program, the Bennington Writers Seminars, and the Corporation of Yaddo. Her work has also been nominated for a Pushcart Prize. Song of a Captive Bird won the Writer's Center first novel prize and was long-listed for the 2018 Center for Fiction First Novel Prize. Her first book, The Good Daughter, was a finalist for the Library of Virginia's 2012 People's Choice Award and was shortlisted for the William Saroyan International Prize in Creative Nonfiction.

== Bibliography ==
- American Goddess. Penguin Random House. 2027 (forthcoming)
- The Bohemians. Penguin Random House. April 6, 2021. ISBN 978-0-593-12942-5
- Song of a Captive Bird. Penguin Random House. February 2018. ISBN 978-0-399-18231-0
- The Good Daughter: A Memoir of My Mother's Hidden Life. Grand Central Publishing. February 2011. ISBN 978-0-446-53497-0
