= Jasmin Hutter =

Swiss politician

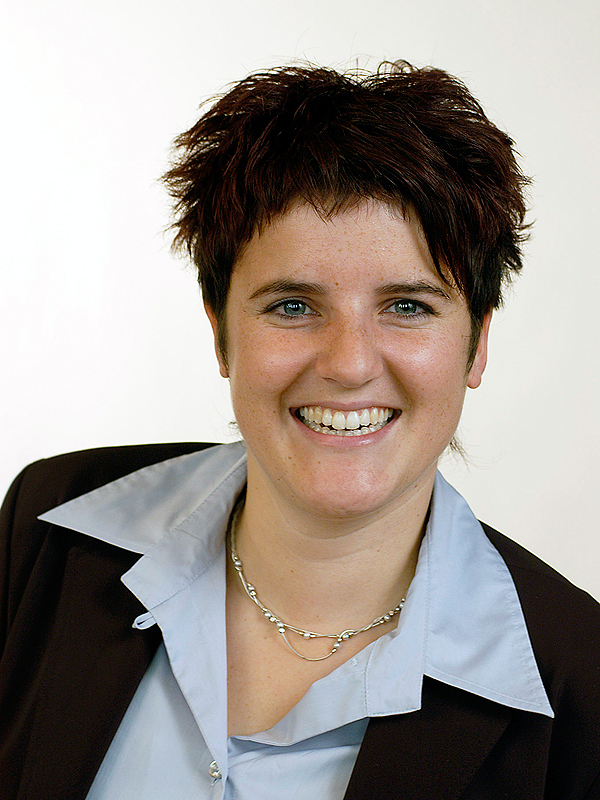

Jasmin Hutter (born 11 June 1978 in Altstätten) is a Swiss politician of the Swiss People's Party, of which she is vice-president.

She holds an MP position at the National Council of Switzerland as a representative from Saint-Gall, and is a member of the Political Institutions commission.

== Notes and references ==
- (in German) Website
