= Jasmin Khezri =

German-Iranian artist (born 1967)

Jasmin Khezri (born 1 June 1967 in London) is a German-Iranian artist, designer, illustrator and writer.

== Life and work ==
Jasmin Khezri studied graphic design at Parsons The New School for Design in Paris and Los Angeles. After her studies she worked for the SZ-Magazine of Süddeutsche Zeitung in Munich and in 1993 became art director of the SZ youth magazine Jetzt. She created its innovative design, which won numerous awards. In 1998 she became art director of the German magazine Marie Claire and in 2000 Creative Director of the fashion company Peek & Cloppenburg.

Khezri created the character IRMA in the early 1990s while working as an art director for the Süddeutsche Zeitung and its youth magazine Jetzt, initially illustrating on the side. She named the character after her grandmother.

According to, Deutsche Welle, IRMA appears in three regular columns in the German edition of Glamour and reaches an audience of nearly one million readers per month. Original drawings of the character have reportedly sold for up to €8,000. As IRMA she gives fashion, lifestyle and beauty advice in women's and lifestyle magazines in Germany, Great Britain, France, the US and Japan. Her illustrations are regularly published in international magazines like Tatler, Elle, Marie Claire, Cosmopolitan, Vogue and Glamour.

== Awards ==
- Visual Lead Award 1996 of the magazine Horizont for the design and concept of the youth magazine Jetzt
- Förderpreis Angewandte Kunst der Landeshauptstadt München, 1996

== Exhibitions ==
- City Hall, Munich, 1997
- La Samaritaine, Paris, 2001
- Art of Taste, New York, 2003
- Art Meets Fashion“, Praterinsel, Munich, 2009
- Isetan Gallery, Tokyo, 2010
- Seven Elohim Gallery, Munich, 2018
