= Jasmin Spahić =

Bosnia and Herzegovina footballer

Personal information
- Date of birth: 22 September 1980 (age 46)
- Place of birth: Mostar, Yugoslavia
- Height: 1.76 m (5 ft 9 in)
- Position: Defender

Youth career
- FK Željezničar Sarajevo
- Turbina Jablanica
- 1997–1999: Hamburger SV

Senior career*
Years	Team	Apps	(Gls)
1999–2001	Hamburger SV II	5	(0)
2001–2009	Kickers Emden	225	(14)
- * Club domestic league appearances and goals

Jasmin Spahić (born 22 September 1980) is a Bosnian former footballer who played as a defender.

== Career ==
Spahić played the majority of his career for German third-tier side Kickers Emden. He ruptured a patellar tendon in his left knee in March 2009.
