= Desperate Housewives =

American television series (2004–2012)

- Genre: Comedy drama; Mystery; Soap opera
- Created by: Marc Cherry
- Starring: Teri Hatcher; Felicity Huffman; Marcia Cross; Eva Longoria; Nicollette Sheridan; Steven Culp; Ricardo Chavira; Mark Moses; Andrea Bowen; Jesse Metcalfe; Cody Kasch; Brenda Strong; James Denton; Alfre Woodard; Doug Savant; Richard Burgi; Kyle MacLachlan; Dana Delany; Shawn Pyfrom; Neal McDonough; Drea de Matteo; Maiara Walsh; Kathryn Joosten; Vanessa Williams; Kevin Rahm; Tuc Watkins; Jonathan Cake; Charles Mesure; Madison De La Garza
- Narrated by: Brenda Strong (178 episodes); Steven Culp ("My Husband, the Pig"); Nicollette Sheridan ("Look Into Their Eyes and You See What They Know")
- Theme music composer: Danny Elfman
- Composers: Steve Jablonsky; Stewart Copeland; Steve Bartek; Louis Febre
- Country of origin: United States
- Original language: English
- No. of seasons: 8
- No. of episodes: 180 (list of episodes)

Production
- Executive producers: Marc Cherry; See full list
- Producers: Charles Skouras III; Stephanie Hagen; Alexandra Cunningham; Jamie Gorenberg; Kevin Etten; Tracey Stern; Patty Lin; Annie Weisman
- Production locations: Universal Studios Hollywood; San Fernando Valley; Los Angeles County, California (filming)
- Editor: Karen Castañeda
- Camera setup: Single-camera
- Running time: 43 minutes
- Production companies: Cherry Productions; ABC Studios (Note: Credited as Touchstone Television for first 3 seasons)

Original release
- Network: ABC
- Release: October 3, 2004 – May 13, 2012

Related
- Devious Maids

Desperate Housewives is an American primetime television soap opera created by Marc Cherry, and produced by ABC Studios and Cherry Productions. It aired for eight seasons on ABC from October 3, 2004, until May 13, 2012, for a total of 180 episodes. Executive producer Marc Cherry served as showrunner. Other executive producers since the fourth season included Bob Daily, George W. Perkins, John Pardee, Joey Murphy, David Grossman, and Larry Shaw.

Set on Wisteria Lane, a street in the fictional town of Fairview in the fictional Eagle State, Desperate Housewives follows the lives of a group of women as seen through the eyes of their friend and neighbor who takes her own life in the pilot episode. The series covers fifteen years of the women's lives, which includes a five-year timeline jump in the series' narrative. The women work through domestic struggles and family life, while being faced with the secrets, crimes, and mysteries hidden behind the doors of their superficially perfect suburban neighborhood.

The series features an ensemble cast, headed by Teri Hatcher as Susan Mayer, Felicity Huffman as Lynette Scavo, Marcia Cross as Bree Van de Kamp, and Eva Longoria as Gabrielle Solis. The supporting cast included Nicollette Sheridan as Edie Britt, Dana Delany as Katherine Mayfair, and Vanessa Williams as Renee Perry. Brenda Strong narrates the series as the late Mary Alice Young, appearing sporadically in flashbacks or dream sequences.

Desperate Housewives was well received by viewers and critics alike, receiving many accolades. It won multiple Primetime Emmy, Golden Globe and Screen Actors Guild Awards. From the 2004–05 through the 2008–09 television seasons, its first five seasons were rated amongst the top ten most-watched series. And it remained in the top 10 for the key 18–49 demographic into its 6th season through the 2009–10 television season. In 2007, it was reported to be the most popular show in its demographic worldwide, with an audience of approximately 120 million and was also reported as the third-most-watched television series in a study of ratings in twenty countries. In 2012, it remained the most-watched comedy series internationally based on data from Eurodata TV Worldwide, which measured ratings across five continents; it has held this position since 2006. Moreover, it was the third-highest revenue-earning series for 2010, with $2.74 million per half an hour. The show was ranked at number fifty-six on Entertainment Weekly's "New TV Classics" list.

In August 2011, it was confirmed that the eighth season of Desperate Housewives would be the show's last; the series finale aired on May 13, 2012. By the end of the series, it had surpassed Charmed with the most episodes in an hour-long television series featuring all-female leads.

== Premise ==
The first season premiered on October 3, 2004, and introduces the four central characters of the show: Susan Mayer, Lynette Scavo, Bree Van de Kamp and Gabrielle Solis, as well as their families and neighbors on Wisteria Lane. The main mystery of the season is the unexpected suicide of Mary Alice Young, and the involvement of her husband Paul Young (Mark Moses) and their son Zach (Cody Kasch) in the events leading up to it. Susan fights promiscuous neighbour Edie Britt (Nicollette Sheridan) for the affection of new neighbor Mike Delfino (James Denton); Lynette struggles to cope with her four demanding children; Bree fights to save her marriage to Rex Van de Kamp (Steven Culp) while dealing with her rebellious son Andrew Van de Kamp (Shawn Pyfrom); and Gabrielle tries to prevent her husband Carlos Solis (Ricardo Antonio Chavira) from discovering that she is having an affair with their underage gardener, John Rowland (Jesse Metcalfe). The first season is also marked by mystery surrounding the murder of a neighbor and some secrets revealed about Zach, Mike, and Paul. At the end of the season both Paul and Zach go missing.

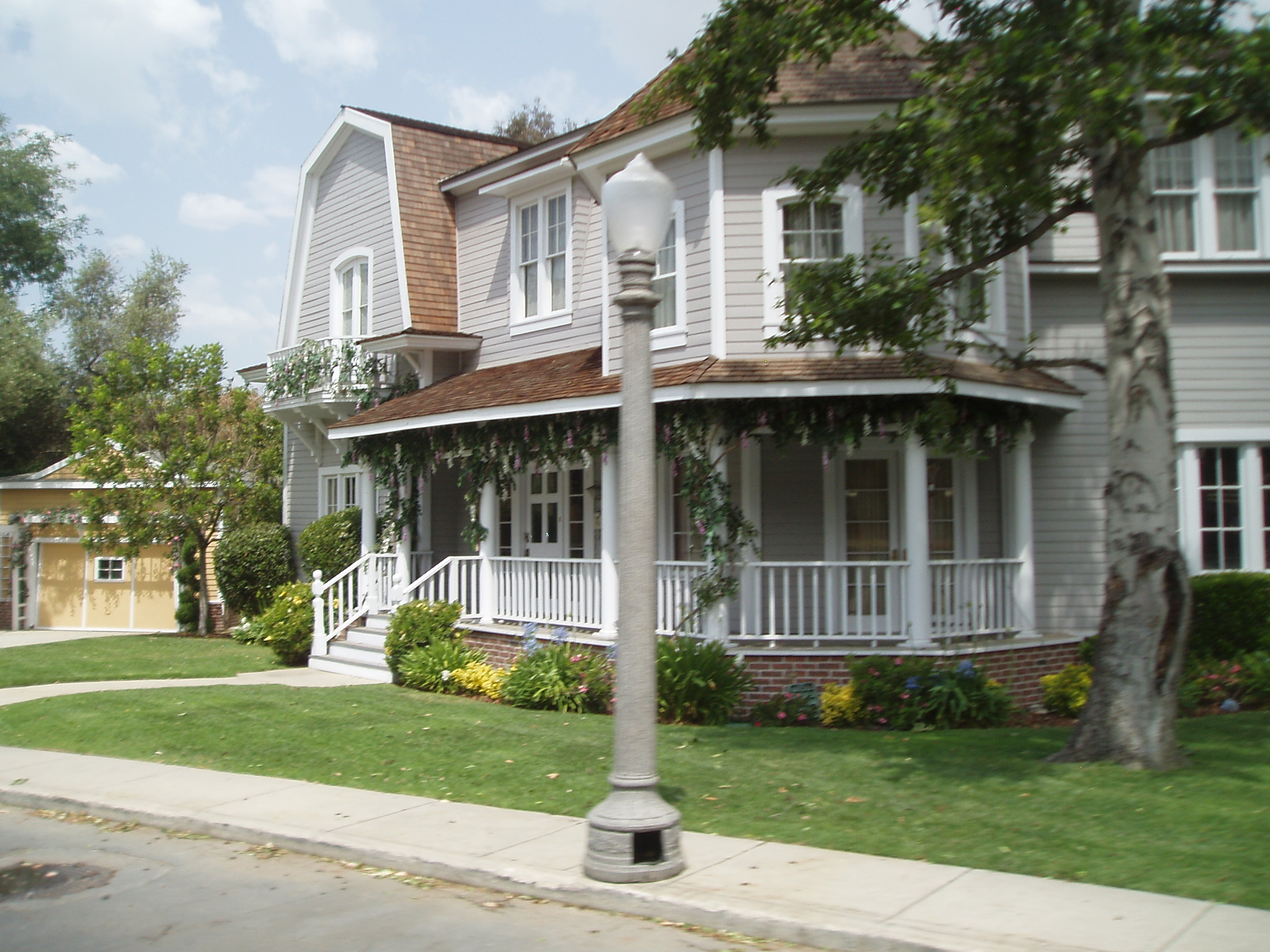
The Applewhite house, focus of Desperate Housewives' season-long mystery from 2005 to 2006

The second season premiered on September 25, 2005, and its central mystery is that of new neighbor Betty Applewhite (Alfre Woodard), who moves onto Wisteria Lane with her son Matthew in the middle of the night from Chicago. She keeps someone prisoner in her basement who tries to escape multiple times. Throughout the season, Bree tries to cope with being a widow; unknowingly begins dating the man who had poisoned her husband; fights alcoholism, is unable to prevent the gap between her and her son Andrew from growing to extremes: and deals with her daughter Danielle's new romance with Matthew Applewhite (Mehcad Brooks). Susan's love life becomes even more complicated as she has serious conflicts with Mike, and her ex-husband Karl Mayer (Richard Burgi) who is engaged to Edie, also starts to lean towards Susan. Lynette goes back to her career in advertising while her husband Tom Scavo (Doug Savant) becomes a stay-at-home father, and Gabrielle decides to be faithful to Carlos, who is now in prison after being double-crossed by a business partner, and begins preparations to have a child. Paul is framed and sent to jail, not for the murder he committed in the previous season, but for a fake one. Paul's son Zach reconnects with his wealthy maternal grandfather.

The third season premiered on September 24, 2006. In the third season, Bree marries Orson Hodge (Kyle MacLachlan), whose past and involvement with a recently discovered dead body becomes the main mystery of the season. Meanwhile, Lynette has to adjust to the arrival of Tom's previously unknown daughter (Kayla) and her mother (Nora) to the family. The Scavos also experience tension as Tom wants to start a pizzeria. Gabrielle goes through a rough divorce, tries to get back into modelling, and finally finds new love in Fairview's new mayor, Victor Lang. After being run over by Orson in the previous season finale, Mike falls into a coma and suffers from amnesia when he wakes up. Edie sees her chance to make her move on Mike, and her family relations are explored throughout the season. Susan loses hope that Mike's memory will return and in the process moves on to a handsome Englishman, Ian Hainsworth (Dougray Scott), whose wife is also in a coma. Meanwhile, her daughter Julie Mayer (Andrea Bowen) starts dating Edie's nephew, Austin McCann (Josh Henderson), of which Susan disapproves. Elderly neighbor Karen McCluskey (Kathryn Joosten) hides something in her freezer. A shooting at the local grocery store leaves two characters dead and changes everyone's lives forever.

The fourth season premiered on September 30, 2007, and its main mystery revolves around new neighbor Katherine Mayfair (Dana Delany) and her family, who return to Wisteria Lane after 12 years away. Lynette battles cancer; the newlywed—but unhappy—Gabrielle starts an affair with her ex-husband Carlos; Susan and Mike enjoy life as a married couple and learn that they are expecting a child; Bree fakes a pregnancy on behalf of her daughter (Danielle Van de Kamp) and plans to raise her teenage daughter's illegitimate child as her own; and Edie schemes to hold on to her new love, Carlos, who has moved in with Mike as an interim arrangement. A gay couple from Chicago—Lee McDermott (Kevin Rahm) and Bob Hunter (Tuc Watkins)—become residents of Wisteria Lane. A tornado threatens to destroy everything, and everyone, that the housewives hold dear. In the closing minutes, the characters and their story have flashed forward by five years.

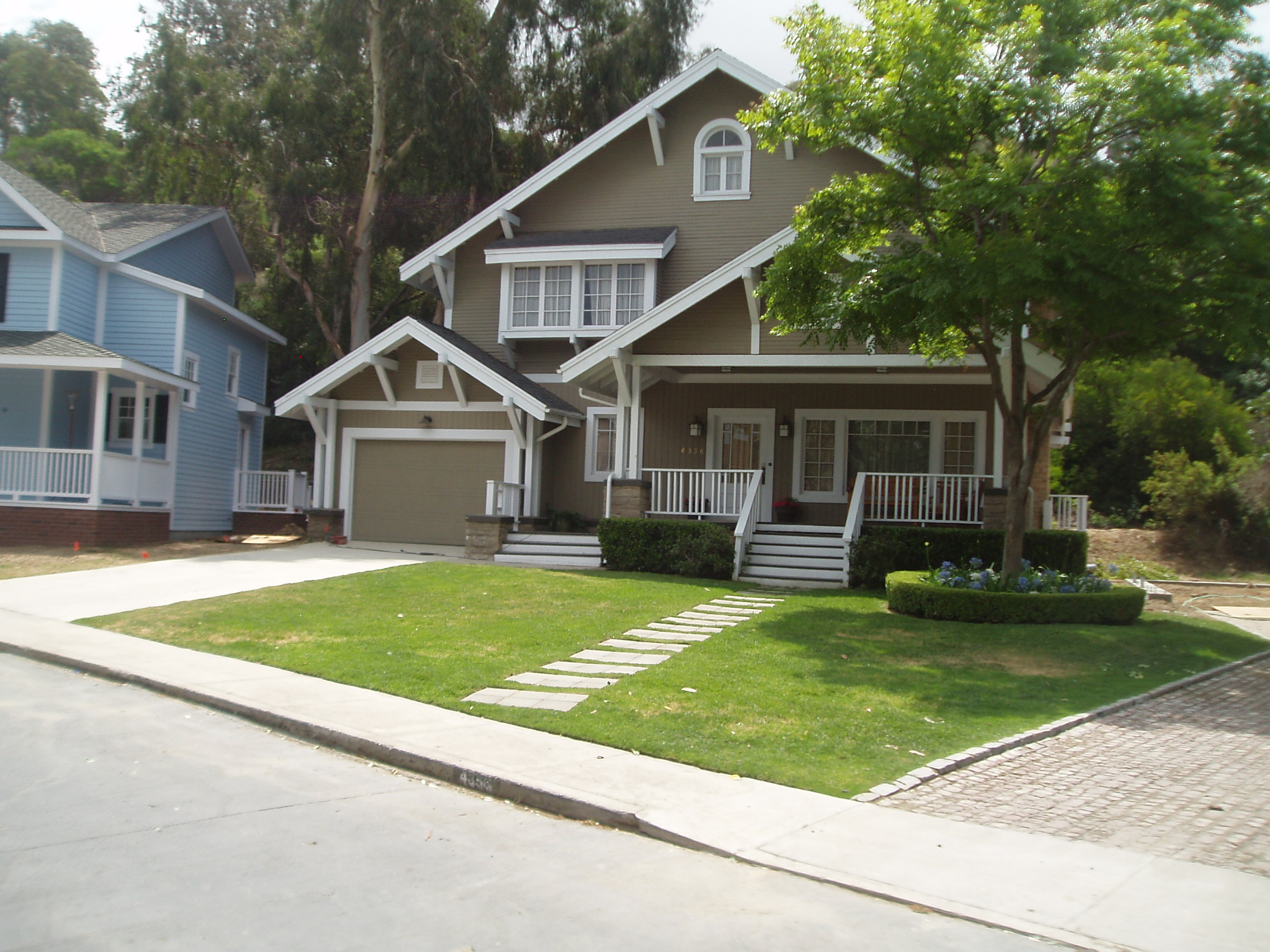
The house of Katherine Mayfair on Wisteria Lane, as seen on Desperate Housewives from 2007 to 2010

The fifth season premiered on September 28, 2008, with the time period jumping forward five years after the previous season, with some flashbacks to events which happened between the two periods. The season mystery revolves around Edie's new husband, Dave Williams (Neal McDonough), who is looking for revenge on someone on Wisteria Lane (later revealed to be Mike because of a road accident Mike and Susan were involved in that killed Dave's wife and daughter). Susan and Mike are divorced due to the accident putting pressure on their marriage. Susan deals with being a single mother to son MJ Delfino, and having a new romance with her painter, while Mike starts dating Katherine. Lynette and Tom learn that their now teenage son Porter is having an affair with a married woman whose husband's nightclub burns down with all of Wisteria Lane's neighbors inside. Gabrielle struggles with Carlos' blindness, triggered in an injury during the tornado in season 4; two overweight young daughters, Juanita and Celia; and a financial crisis. Bree and Orson have marriage problems because Bree had pressured Orson into doing time in prison for running over Mike and he resents her. She has become too focused on her career as a successful cookbook writer and caterer, and her daughter Danielle had come to claim back her son while Orson was in prison. Edie dies of electrocution after a car crash, before she can expose Dave's motives moments after she discovers his secret.

The sixth season premiered on Sunday, September 27, 2009, at 9 pm. The main mystery of this season is surrounding new neighbor Angie Bolen (Drea de Matteo) and her family. The first half of the season consists of Julie being strangled by an unknown person; the conflict between Gabrielle and her niece Ana Solis (Maiara Walsh); Karen McCluskey finding new love; Lynette's attempts to sue her new boss Carlos for firing her for getting pregnant; Katherine's eventual mental breakdown at losing Mike to Susan; and Bree's affair with Karl, which ends tragically when Karl's hired plane crashes into a building with him and Orson inside, killing Karl and leaving Orson paralyzed. The second half of the season focuses on Katherine experimenting with her sexuality; Lynette unknowingly inviting the Fairview strangler to stay with them before discovering the truth; the conflict between Bree and a son of Rex whom he had before meeting her; and the solving of the Bolen mystery.

The seventh season premiered on September 26, 2010, and its main mystery is Paul Young's return to Wisteria Lane with a new wife and with plans of punishing the residents for shunning him during his incarceration, while an old nemesis of his still plans to get her own revenge on him. Lynette's best friend from college Renee Perry (Vanessa Williams) moves onto the lane and stirs things up among the other housewives. Gabrielle and Carlos learn an unsettling fact about their daughter Juanita Solis (Madison De La Garza) (who was switched at birth), which ultimately leads them back to Gabrielle's home town of Las Colinas. A now divorced Bree starts dating her contractor, and reveals the truth about the death of Carlos' mother Juanita at the hands of her son Andrew in the second season, consequently ending the friendship between Carlos and Bree. Due to financial problems, Susan and her family have moved off the lane, and Susan is forced to earn money by doing pornography. Following a major riot on the lane, Susan is injured and put on the waiting list for a vital organ donation. Lynette persuades Tom to take an exciting new job, which leads to unprecedented problems in their marriage.

The eighth and final season premiered on Sunday, September 25, 2011. The main mystery of the season is the death of Gabrielle's perverted stepfather Alejandro Perez (Tony Plana) at Carlos' hands, and its cover-up by the four housewives, which occurred in the previous season finale. After the murder, Bree receives a blackmail letter from an unknown person similar to the one Mary Alice had received in the first season. Due to her relationship with detective Chuck Vance (Jonathan Cake), Bree becomes the main character affected by the cover-up of Alejandro's murder, and is eventually accused of killing Alejandro herself. A new neighbor, Ben Faulkner (Charles Mesure), moves onto the lane, attracting Renee along the way. Ben is going through severe financial problems, and resorts to a dangerous and unruly loan shark to bail him out. Mike meddles in the business of Ben's loan shark in an attempt to protect Renee, but he is eventually shot dead by the loan shark. During the first half of the season, Susan struggles with the guilt of her involvement in the Alejandro case, and during the second half, she tries to deal with both Julie's unexpected pregnancy at the hands of Lynette's son Preston and Mike's death. Following the cover-up of Alejandro's murder, Carlos develops an alcohol problem, but Gabrielle persuades him to recover in rehab, which eventually results in Gabrielle and Carlos switching house roles. Tom moves out of the family home, and Lynette struggles to come to terms with how quickly Tom seems to have moved on, until she accepts that she is still in love with him, and decides she will try to win him back. Mrs. McCluskey receives worrying news about her health and decides to end it all, but Bree manages to convince her otherwise.

The two-hour series finale, which aired on Sunday, May 13, 2012, featured the conclusion of Bree's court case. To bring the series to a conclusion, there was a wedding, a birth, and a death, and the future of the four main housewives was revealed.

== Cast and characters ==
During its premiere season, the show featured thirteen starring actors, all credited in the opening sequence. For the show's second year, several actors, mainly child and teenage ones, who had guest starred during the first season, were promoted to series regulars without having their names included in the opening sequence. Instead, they were billed as "also starring" during the first minutes of each episode, together with episode guest stars. This practice continued for the rest of the series.

= Starring cast (credited)
= Also starring cast (credited)
= Recurring cast (3+)
= Guest cast (1–2)

Actor	Character	Season							
Actor	Character	1	2	3	4	5	6	7	8
Starring
Teri Hatcher	Susan Mayer	Main	Main	Main	Main	Main	Main	Main	Main
Felicity Huffman	Lynette Scavo	Main	Main	Main	Main	Main	Main	Main	Main
Marcia Cross	Bree Van de Kamp	Main	Main	Main	Main	Main	Main	Main	Main
Eva Longoria	Gabrielle Solis	Main	Main	Main	Main	Main	Main	Main	Main
Nicollette Sheridan	Edie Britt	Main	Main	Main	Main	Main			
Steven Culp	Rex Van de Kamp	Main	Special Guest	Guest (Note: Voice only.)		Special Guest		Special Guest (Note: In season 8, Culp also makes an uncredited cameo appearance in "Finishing the Hat" (8x23) in addition to his credited appearance in "Women and Death" (8x17).)	Special Guest
Ricardo Chavira	Carlos Solis	Main	Main	Main	Main	Main	Main	Main	Main
Mark Moses	Paul Young	Main	Main	Recurring			Guest (Note: Moses makes an uncredited cameo in "I Guess This Is Goodbye" (6x23).)	Main	Guest
Andrea Bowen	Julie Mayer	Main	Main	Main	Main	Guest	Also starring	Guest	Recurring
Jesse Metcalfe	John Rowland	Main	Recurring (Note: Metcalfe is credited as a guest star in all of his appearances during the second season with the exception of "Remember, Part 2" (2x24) where he is credited as a special guest star.)	Special Guest	Special Guest		Special Guest		
Cody Kasch	Zach Young	Main	Main	Recurring				Recurring	
Brenda Strong	Mary Alice Young	Main	Main	Main	Main	Main	Main	Main	Main
James Denton	Mike Delfino	Main	Main	Main	Main	Main	Main	Main	Main
Alfre Woodard	Betty Applewhite	Special Guest	Main						
Doug Savant	Tom Scavo	Recurring	Main	Main	Main	Main	Main	Main	Main
Richard Burgi	Karl Mayer	Recurring	Main	Guest	Guest	Recurring	Recurring		Guest (Note: Makes an uncredited cameo appearance in "Finishing the Hat" (8x23).)
Kyle MacLachlan	Orson Hodge		Recurring (Note: Credited as a special guest star in a recurring capacity.)	Main	Main	Main	Main	Special Guest	Recurring
Dana Delany	Katherine Mayfair				Main	Main	Main		Special Guest
Neal McDonough	Dave Williams					Main			
Shawn Pyfrom	Andrew Van de Kamp	Recurring	Also starring	Also starring	Also starring	Main	Recurring	Recurring	Special Guest
Drea de Matteo	Angie Bolen						Main		
Maiara Walsh	Ana Solis					Guest	Main		
Kathryn Joosten	Karen McCluskey	Guest	Recurring	Recurring	Recurring	Recurring	Main (Note: Joosten is credited as "starring" from "I Guess This Is Goodbye" (6x23) to "Come on Over for Dinner" (7x23). She is credited as "also starring" during the first 22 episodes of the sixth season.)	Main	Also starring
Vanessa Williams	Renee Perry							Main	Main
Kevin Rahm	Lee McDermott				Recurring	Recurring	Recurring	Main	Also starring
Tuc Watkins	Bob Hunter				Recurring	Recurring	Recurring	Main	Also starring
Jonathan Cake	Chuck Vance							Recurring	Main (Note: Cake is credited as a series regular until "Putting It Together" (8x09). He makes an uncredited cameo appearance in "Finishing the Hat" (8x23).)
Charles Mesure	Ben Faulkner								Main (Note: Mesure is credited as "starring" from "Who Can Say What's True?" (8x11) onwards. He is credited as "also starring" in the first 10 episodes of the eighth season.)
Madison De La Garza	Juanita Solis					Recurring	Also starring	Also starring	Main
Also starring
Joy Lauren	Danielle Van de Kamp	Recurring	Also starring	Also starring	Also starring	Guest	Guest	Guest	Guest
Mehcad Brooks	Matthew Applewhite	Guest	Also starring						
Brent Kinsman	Preston Scavo	Recurring	Also starring	Also starring	Also starring	Guest	Guest	Guest	
Max Carver	Preston Scavo					Also starring	Recurring	Recurring	Guest
Shane Kinsman	Porter Scavo	Recurring	Also starring	Also starring	Also starring	Guest	Guest	Guest	
Charlie Carver	Porter Scavo					Also starring	Also starring	Also starring	Also starring
Zane Huett	Parker Scavo	Recurring	Also starring	Also starring	Also starring		Guest		
Joshua Logan Moore	Parker Scavo					Also starring	Also starring	Also starring	Also starring
Roger Bart	George Williams	Recurring	Also starring (Note: Roger Bart is credited as "also starring" until "That's Good, That's Bad" (2x09). He returns as a special guest star in "Remember, Part 2" (2x24).)						Guest
Page Kennedy	Caleb Applewhite		Also starring						
NaShawn Kearse	Caleb Applewhite		Also starring						
Josh Henderson	Austin McCann			Also starring					
Lyndsy Fonseca	Dylan Mayfair				Also starring		Guest		
Rachel Fox	Kayla Scavo			Recurring	Also starring				
Kendall Applegate	Penny Scavo					Also starring	Also starring		
Darcy Rose Byrnes	Penny Scavo							Also starring	Also starring
Jeffrey Nordling	Nick Bolen						Also starring		
Beau Mirchoff	Danny Bolen						Also starring		
Mason Vale Cotton	M.J. Delfino					Recurring	Also starring	Also starring	Also starring

Cast Notes

== Production ==
The idea for the series was conceived as Marc Cherry and his mother were watching a news report on Andrea Yates. Prior to Desperate Housewives, Cherry was best known for producing and writing episodes of Touchstone Television's hit comedy series The Golden Girls and its successor, The Golden Palace. In addition, he had created or co-created three sitcoms: The 5 Mrs. Buchanans, The Crew, and Some of My Best Friends, none of which lasted longer than a year. Cherry had difficulty getting any television network interested in his new series; HBO, CBS, NBC, Fox, Showtime, and Lifetime all turned the show down. Finally, two new executives at ABC, Lloyd Braun and Susan Lyne, chose to greenlight it, reportedly after The O.C. on Fox premiered in 2003 and showed that a soap opera could succeed in prime time. Marc Cherry stated: "In April 2002, I was absolutely 'desperate.' I was broke, couldn't even land an interview for a screenplay, and was seriously worried about my future. I had just turned forty and was starting to wonder if I wasn't one of those poor deluded souls wandering around Hollywood convinced they were talented screenwriters when all evidence pointed to the contrary. But since I have a considerable amount of self-esteem [...], I started writing the first draft of Desperate Housewives, convinced it could turn my life around. Guys, if I hadn't seen it right!". Shortly thereafter, Disney had both Braun and Lyne fired, following their approval of another new drama series: Lost.

The ABC executives were not initially satisfied with the name of the new show, suggesting Wisteria Lane and The Secret Lives of Housewives, instead. However, on October 23, 2003, Desperate Housewives was announced by ABC, presented as a primetime soap opera created by Charles Pratt Jr., of Melrose Place fame, and Marc Cherry, who declared the new show to be a mix of Knots Landing and American Beauty (1999) with a little bit of Twin Peaks. While Cherry continued his work on the show, Pratt was credited as executive producer for the pilot episode only, remaining linked to the show as a consulting producer during the first two seasons.

On May 18, 2004, ABC announced the 2004–2005 lineup, with Desperate Housewives in the Sunday at 9:00–10:00 p.m. ET slot, which it held all through the run of the show. After only three episodes, on October 20, 2004, ABC announced that Desperate Housewives, along with Lost, had been picked up for a full season. A couple of weeks later after Housewives premiered the owners of NBC called to see who had passed on the series due to its ratings success.

Desperate Housewives was produced by creator Marc Cherry (Cherry Productions), Austin Bagley and, since 2007, ABC Studios. From 2004 to 2007, Desperate Housewives was produced in association with Touchstone Television.

=== Production crew ===
Cherry, Tom Spezialy, and Michael Edelstein served as executive producers for the show's first two seasons. Spezialy, who also served as a staff writer, left his previous position as writer and executive producer for Dead Like Me to join the Desperate Housewives crew. He had also worked as writer and co-executive producer on several shows, among them Ed, Jack and Jill, and Parker Lewis Can't Lose, while Edelstein had been the executive producer of Threat Matrix and Hope & Faith.

Second season conflicts arose among the executive producers. Subsequently, Edelstein left the show mid-season, and by the season's end, so did Spezialy. For the third year, Cherry was joined by award-winning writer and producer Joe Keenan—of Frasier fame—and television movie producer George W. Perkins, who had been a crew member of Desperate Housewives since the show's conception. Although receiving praise for his work on the show, Keenan chose to leave Desperate Housewives after one season to pursue other projects. Replacing him as executive producer for season 4 was Bob Daily, who had joined the crew as a writer and co-executive producer during season 3. Daily's previous work include writing for the animated series Rugrats, and for Frasier. Also joining Cherry, Perkins, and Daily for season 4 were John Pardee and Joey Murphy, who had been with the series since the beginning. Both had also worked on Cherry's previous show, The Crew, in 1995, as well as on the sitcom Cybill.

In the first four seasons, Larry Shaw and David Grossman were the most prolific directors, together directing more than half of the episodes.

=== Filming ===
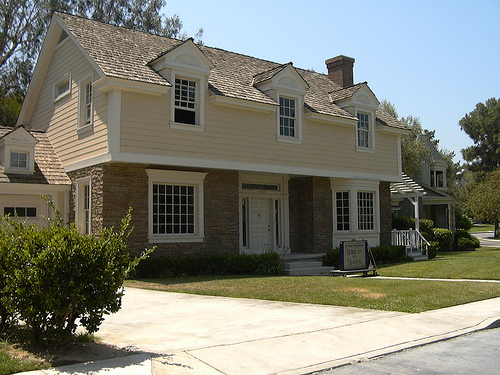
The residence of Mary Alice Young (as seen in the premiere episode of Desperate Housewives), on Wisteria Lane

Desperate Housewives was filmed on Panavision 35 mm cameras (except for the final season, which was shot digitally on the Arri Alexa). It was broadcast in standard and widescreen high definition, though it was framed for the 4:3 aspect ratio until the final season.

The set for Wisteria Lane, consisting mainly of facades but also of some actual houses, was located on the Universal Studios Hollywood back lot. It was referred to by film crews as Colonial Street, and has been used for several motion pictures and television shows since the mid-1940s. Notable productions that were filmed here include: So Goes My Love, Leave it to Beaver, The 'Burbs, Providence, Deep Impact, Bedtime for Bonzo, The Best Little Whorehouse in Texas, Gremlins, The Munsters, Psycho, Buffy the Vampire Slayer, and the Doris Day comedies The Thrill of It All and Send Me No Flowers. For the second season of Desperate Housewives, the street underwent some significant changes. Among the most noticeable of these changes was the removal of a church facade and a mansion in order to make room for Edie's house and a park.

Interior sets were built on sound stages at Universal Studios Hollywood, some of which were duplicated in some form on the Wisteria Lane back lot for filming when conditions required it.

Filming for the series ended April 26, 2012.

=== Opening sequence ===
The initial idea for the show's opening sequence was Cherry's. After asking 16 companies to come up with suggestions for how best to realize it, the producers finally hired Hollywood-based yU+co to provide the final version. According to the yU+co's official website, the idea behind the sequence is, "to evoke the show's quirky spirit and playful flouting of women's traditional role in society." The images featured are taken from eight pieces of art, portraying domesticity and male–female relations through the ages.

The music for the opening was composed by Danny Elfman, and was nominated for a Primetime Emmy Award for Outstanding Main Title Design in 2005. It also has been awarded both a Primetime Emmy Award for Outstanding Original Main Title Theme Music in 2005 and the BMI TV Music Award. In 2005, it was included on the album Music from and Inspired by Desperate Housewives. In 2017, James Charisma of Paste ranked the show's opening sequence at the 29th position on a list of The 75 Best TV Title Sequences of All Time. When an episode runs long, only the first sequence (the falling apple) is kept. From the fourth season onwards, a shortened synthesized version of the theme (arranged and performed by frequent series composer Steve Jablonsky) is heard, which underscores the falling apple scene, and the photograph of the four lead actresses, crediting Marc Cherry as creator.

=== Music ===
In addition to the theme composed by Danny Elfman, the first two episodes scored by Elfman's former Oingo Boingo bandmate Steve Bartek, and the third episode scored by ex-Police Stewart Copeland, the series underscore music, composed by Steve Jablonsky since the fourth episode of the first season, defines the overall sound of the show by creating a musical counterpoint to the writing style. The score is electronic based, but every scoring session incorporates a live string ensemble. Jablonsky incorporates recurring themes for events and characters into the score. Hollywood Records produced the first soundtrack album, Music from and Inspired by Desperate Housewives (2005), distributed by Universal Music Group. Several of those songs have been used in subsequent seasons.

Desperate Housewives' unique style combined with the heavy dialogue and a quick-fire writing style limits the amount of popular music used within the series. The series' music supervisor, David Sibley, works closely with the producers to integrate these musical needs into the show. In addition to featured performances by central characters such as Susan Mayer singing along with Rose Royce's "Car Wash" and Lynette's rendition of "Boogie Shoes", several characters have been accomplished musicians, such as Betty Applewhite (a concert pianist) and Dylan Mayfair (a prodigy cellist).

=== Later seasons ===
In August 2009, Marc Cherry said that Desperate Housewives would be on television for a few more years, stating that the series still "has a lot of life left in it." He told The Wrap:

Steve McPherson (ABC Entertainment president) and I agree that we shouldn't keep the show going for more than a couple [of] years past my seven-year initial contract. We don't want it to just fade away. We've been in negotiations. I expect to sign my new deal soon to set up a future scenario for the show. Someone else will run the show after season seven and I will serve as executive producer from a distance.

He went on to explain that he felt the program had been revitalized by the five-year leap forward for season five, saying: "Yes, I think it worked well. It was a way to start fresh and let everyone start from scratch in a way".

In October 2009, Cherry signed a two-year deal with ABC that could keep Desperate Housewives on the air until 2013. The stars of Desperate Housewives finalized new deals to make way for the eighth season and signed at the price of $12 million.

Cherry hinted that Desperate Housewives would end in 2013, and in April 2011, Eva Longoria confirmed that there would definitely be an eighth season and expressed hopes for a ninth. Desperate Housewives was officially renewed by ABC on May 17, 2011, for an eighth season.

=== Final season ===
In August 2011, it was confirmed that the eighth season of Desperate Housewives would be the final season. Eva Longoria tweeted about the end of Desperate Housewives:

It's confirmed! We are filming our last season of Desperate Housewives! I am so grateful for what the show has given me! We always knew we wanted to end on top and I thank ABC for giving us our victory lap! And a special thanks to Marc Cherry who forever changed my life!

Cherry, the show's creator, made a cameo as a mover in the last scene of the final episode.

== Episodes ==
Season	Episodes	Originally released		Rank	Average viewership (in millions)	18–49 Rank	18–49 Rating
Season	Episodes	First released	Last released	Rank	Average viewership (in millions)	18–49 Rank	18–49 Rating
1	23	October 3, 2004	May 22, 2005	4	24.13	3	10.4
2	24	September 25, 2005	May 21, 2006	4	23.99	3	9.3
3	23	September 24, 2006	May 20, 2007	10	19.18	5	6.9
4	17	September 30, 2007	May 18, 2008	6	17.83	3	7.0
5	24	September 28, 2008	May 17, 2009	9	14.80	5	5.3
6	23	September 27, 2009	May 16, 2010	20	12.82	9	4.8
7	23	September 26, 2010	May 15, 2011	26	11.17	18	3.8
8	23	September 25, 2011	May 13, 2012	37	8.76	27	3.6

== Reception ==
=== Ratings ===
Season	Timeslot (EST)	# Ep.	Premiere		Finale		TV season	Rank	18–49 average	Overall viewership
Season	Timeslot (EST)	# Ep.	Date	Viewers (in millions)	Date	Viewers (in millions)	TV season	Rank	18–49 average	Overall viewership
1	Sunday; 9:00 pm	23	October 3, 2004	21.64	May 22, 2005	30.62	2004–05	#4	10.66	23.69
2	Sunday; 9:00 pm	24	September 25, 2005	28.36	May 21, 2006	24.23	2005–06	#4	10.09	21.70
3	Sunday; 9:00 pm	23	September 24, 2006	24.09	May 20, 2007	18.82	2006–07	#10	7.57	16.70
4	Sunday; 9:00 pm	17	September 30, 2007	19.32	May 18, 2008	16.84	2007–08	#6	6.71	17.52
5	Sunday; 9:00 pm	24	September 28, 2008	18.68	May 17, 2009	13.96	2008–09	#9	5.29	15.66
6	Sunday; 9:00 pm	23	September 27, 2009	13.64	May 16, 2010	12.75	2009–10	#20	4.25	12.83
7	Sunday; 9:00 pm	23	September 26, 2010	13.06	May 15, 2011	10.25	2010–11	#26	3.46	11.85
8	Sunday; 9:00 pm	23	September 25, 2011	9.93	May 13, 2012	11.12	2011–12	#37	2.74	10.60

=== Seasons 1–4 ===
Desperate Housewives : U.S. viewers per episode (millions)

Season	Episode number																							
Season	1	2	3	4	5	6	7	8	9	10	11	12	13	14	15	16	17	18	19	20	21	22	23	24
1	21.65	20.03	20.87	21.49	22.14	24.60	24.21	27.24	21.56	22.34	25.20	24.09	25.95	22.30	24.19	24.08	24.61	25.55	25.27	25.69	26.10	25.28	30.62	–
2	28.36	27.11	26.06	25.78	25.22	23.93	25.93	25.92	25.89	25.52	23.72	22.52	25.33	23.47	23.41	22.20	21.41	21.82	20.02	21.30	21.33	21.03	24.23	24.23
3	24.09	21.42	20.96	20.64	19.71	21.24	22.65	22.27	21.63	21.43	18.71	16.76	17.14	18.10	18.51	18.31	15.93	16.35	15.91	17.17	17.16	16.13	18.82	–
4	19.32	17.82	18.89	18.21	18.28	18.58	18.63	18.64	20.65	19.78	16.37	15.75	16.35	16.76	15.43	16.84	16.84	–						

Audience measurement performed by Nielsen Media Research

=== Seasons 5–8 ===
Desperate Housewives : U.S. viewers per episode (millions)

Season	Episode number																							
Season	1	2	3	4	5	6	7	8	9	10	11	12	13	14	15	16	17	18	19	20	21	22	23	24
5	18.68	15.69	15.51	15.49	15.95	15.93	15.85	16.84	15.81	16.09	14.39	13.79	13.08	13.82	14.01	13.65	14.60	14.75	13.85	13.64	13.49	12.29	13.96	13.96
6	13.64	14.64	13.42	13.68	14.18	14.08	13.80	14.72	12.78	14.86	15.35	14.03	11.32	11.44	10.92	10.89	12.01	10.84	10.62	11.29	12.12	11.36	12.75	–
7	13.06	13.23	12.38	12.67	12.16	11.10	12.72	11.92	11.36	11.60	12.19	12.83	10.25	9.20	10.58	11.35	9.05	9.11	10.15	9.44	10.00	10.25	10.25	–
8	9.93	9.16	8.63	8.27	9.17	9.28	8.78	9.29	8.20	8.84	7.91	7.48	6.40	7.65	8.21	8.39	9.03	8.81	8.49	8.02	9.22	11.12	11.12	–

Audience measurement performed by Nielsen Media Research

=== Critical response ===
Critical response of Desperate Housewives
Season	Rotten Tomatoes	Metacritic
1	81% (36 reviews)	79 (27 reviews)
2	53% (15 reviews)	49 (10 reviews)
3	75% (16 reviews)	67 (12 reviews)
4	67% (6 reviews)	—N/a
5	71% (14 reviews)	77 (8 reviews)
6	83% (6 reviews)	—N/a
7	63% (8 reviews)	—N/a
8	90% (21 reviews)	—N/a

The show was the biggest success of the 2004–05 television season, being well received by both critics and viewers. The pilot episode had 21.3 million viewers making it the best new drama for the year, the highest-rated show of the week, and the best performance by a pilot for ABC, since Spin City in 1996.

Along with Lost and Grey's Anatomy, Desperate Housewives was credited to have turned around ABC's declining fortunes. Many critics agreed with Cherry's initial comparison to the popular black comedy film American Beauty, while its themes and appeal to female viewers were compared to those of the award-winning series Sex and the City, and its mysteries were said to resemble those of David Lynch's classic series Twin Peaks. In its first review, USA Today proclaimed the show to be "refreshingly original, bracingly adult and thoroughly delightful" and naming it to be "sort of Knots Landing meets The Golden Girls by way of Twin Peaks".

Following the initial success of the show, the term "desperate housewives" became a cultural phenomenon. This warranted "real-life desperate housewives" features in TV shows, including The Dr. Phil Show, and in magazines. Among the more prominent names to declare themselves fans of the show were Oprah Winfrey, who also dedicated an episode of The Oprah Winfrey Show to her visit at the film set; and the former First Lady of the United States, Laura Bush, who, in a comedic speech during a dinner with White House Correspondents' Association on April 30, 2005, stated, "Ladies and gentlemen, I am a desperate housewife", referring to the show. The series ended up being the fourth-most-watched in the United States during the 2004–2005 season, with 23.7 million viewers each week. The first-season finale was watched by 30.62 million American viewers becoming the most watched episode of the series.

For its second year, the show still maintained its ratings—with 22.2 million viewers, it reclaimed its position as the number four most-watched series. The second season's premiere was watched by 28.4 million viewers. The episode drew in the second largest audience for the series in its history. However, several critics started to notice a declining quality of the show's script, and USA Today's Robert Bianco suggested that the part of the series getting "less good" was that showrunner Cherry had left much of the series writing in the hands of others. Midway through the season executive producer Michael Edenstein left the show due to conflicts with Cherry and in May 2006, just a couple of weeks prior to the second-season finale, so did Tom Spezialy. After the end of the season, Cherry agreed that the second year's script had been weaker and also agreed that it had been a mistake to let go of too much of the show. He now stated that he was back full-time, claiming that both he and the writing staff had learned from their mistakes.

The critics generally agreed on the improved quality for the third year, but the overall ratings fell notably from previous seasons. Due to complications from her pregnancy, Marcia Cross was put on bed rest. After filming one episode from her own personal bedroom she was forced to take maternity leave with eight episodes of season three still remaining. It was predicted that the ratings would be down by over 25% since the premiere year. However, for the last three episodes of the season, the rating turned somewhat, and the season ended up with 17.5 million viewers, falling from number four to number ten on the list of most watched shows. While Cross' departure allowed for the much-underused Edie to have more story, fans noticed a decline in the stories during Cross' departure. Stories such as Lynette's emotional affair with restaurant manager Rick proved unpopular. Furthermore, Susan's contrived triangle with Ian and Mike seemed tiresome to many viewers, particularly in an episode where Susan is lost in the woods trying to find Mike. Notable, however, was that the show's rating among viewers age 18–24 increased from the previous season.

For its fourth season, the series proved to have staying power. The series averaged 18.2 million viewers. Ratings rose in the ninth episode "Something's Coming", where 20.6 million viewers tuned in to see the heavily marketed tornado episode. The show once again moved back into the top five highest-rated programs in the 2007–2008 season, being the number-one ABC drama and beating popular medical drama Grey's Anatomy after falling behind it for the first time in the third season. It also became for the first time the number-one scripted series, beating CSI: Crime Scene Investigation.

Although ratings were down for the fifth season, along with every scripted series on television, Desperate Housewives was still the most-watched scripted series on ABC, consistently beating the other ABC flagship shows, Lost and Grey's Anatomy, although the latter is still number one in the 18–49 demographic, followed by Desperate Housewives.

Similar to the fifth season, ratings were down for the sixth season because of heavy competition in many airings, but the show still managed to remain the second most watched scripted show on ABC and the eleventh most watched scripted show of all broadcast television. The series continued to hit lower ratings, because of competition like the 67th Golden Globe Awards, 52nd Annual Grammy Awards, 2010 Winter Olympics, and the new CBS reality television series Undercover Boss. Nevertheless, the sixth season managed to finish in the top twenty overall, both in total viewers and 18–49 demographic audiences. Among scripted shows, it still ranked in the top ten, in both categories.

The seventh season premiered on September 26, 2010, and averaged 11.85 million viewers. The season saw new lows for the series reaching for the first time below 10 million viewers, and saw lows of 2.7 in the 18–49 demographic. For the first half of the season, ratings started strong averaging 12.3 million viewers and 3.9 in the 18–49 demographic which is similar to the second half of the sixth season. However, ratings declined in the second half of the season, after two contiguous episodes had to compete against the 68th Golden Globe Awards and then the 53rd Annual Grammy Awards. The show failed to recover to viewer levels hit in the first half of the season, and continued to receive 9–10 million viewers and 2.7–3.1 in the 18–49 demographic. This was the first time in its history that Desperate Housewives would not place in the twenty most watched shows of the season, although it would place in the twenty most-watched scripted shows.

The eighth season continued to see declines in the series' ratings. The season premiered to 9.93 million viewers and a 3.2 in the demo making it the least-watched season premiere in the series' history. The season began with ratings similar to those of the latter half of season 7, averaging 8–9 million viewers, and between a 2.8 to 3.0 in the 18–49 demographic. However, after the mid-season finale the ratings returned lower, hitting the seven million viewer mark and a 2.2–2.5 in the demo. The season also saw the lowest ratings in the show's eight-year run. Opposite the 54th Annual Grammy Awards, which featured a tribute to the then-recently deceased entertainer Whitney Houston, and the mid-season premiere of The Walking Dead on AMC, the show fell to a 1.8 rating in adults 18–49 and 6.4 million viewers. However unlike the seventh season, the show's ratings slightly recovered after the series low and leveled around the eight million viewer mark and a 2.6 in the demo. Despite the series lows, the season finale was able to go out on a season high in the ratings and the highest rated episode in over a year and a half, since March 2011 with "Searching". The series finale titled "Finishing the Hat" aired May 13, 2012, was viewed by 11.12 million viewers and a 3.2 in the demo. Despite the lows in the ratings the show managed to remain in the top twenty-five-watched shows in the 18–49 demographic, placing at number twenty-five. However, the show dropped out of the top thirty most-watched shows in total viewers, coming in at thirty-fifth place.

In 2006, the American cable network Bravo launched their reality series, The Real Housewives of..., in the footsteps of the "real life desperate housewives" phenomenon. That program has taken place in areas such as Orange County (California), Atlanta, and two series within the New York-Tri-State Region, within the City itself and the New Jersey suburbs. According to a survey of twenty countries conducted in 2006 by Informa Telecoms and Media, Desperate Housewives was the third-most-watched television series in the world, after fellow American series CSI: Miami and Lost. During a fundraising auction for the British child charity ChildLine in December 2006, a walk-on part in Desperate Housewives had the highest bid, £17,000, beating Daniel Craig's James Bond tuxedo from Casino Royale.

In its first public release of online individual television program rankings, Nielsen Media Research announced that the series had 723,000 unique online viewers in December 2008. Desperate Housewives was the seventh-most-pirated television show of 2009.

In fall 2013, North Korea allegedly executed eighty people for watching banned South Korean soap operas, Desperate Housewives being the most common soap opera. Desperate Housewives was being secretly watched using mp3 players, hard drives, and DVDs.

In September 2015, Desperate Housewives ranked at number one hundred on The Hollywood Reporter's "Hollywood's 100 Favorite TV Shows", as determined by television industry professionals.

== Accolades ==
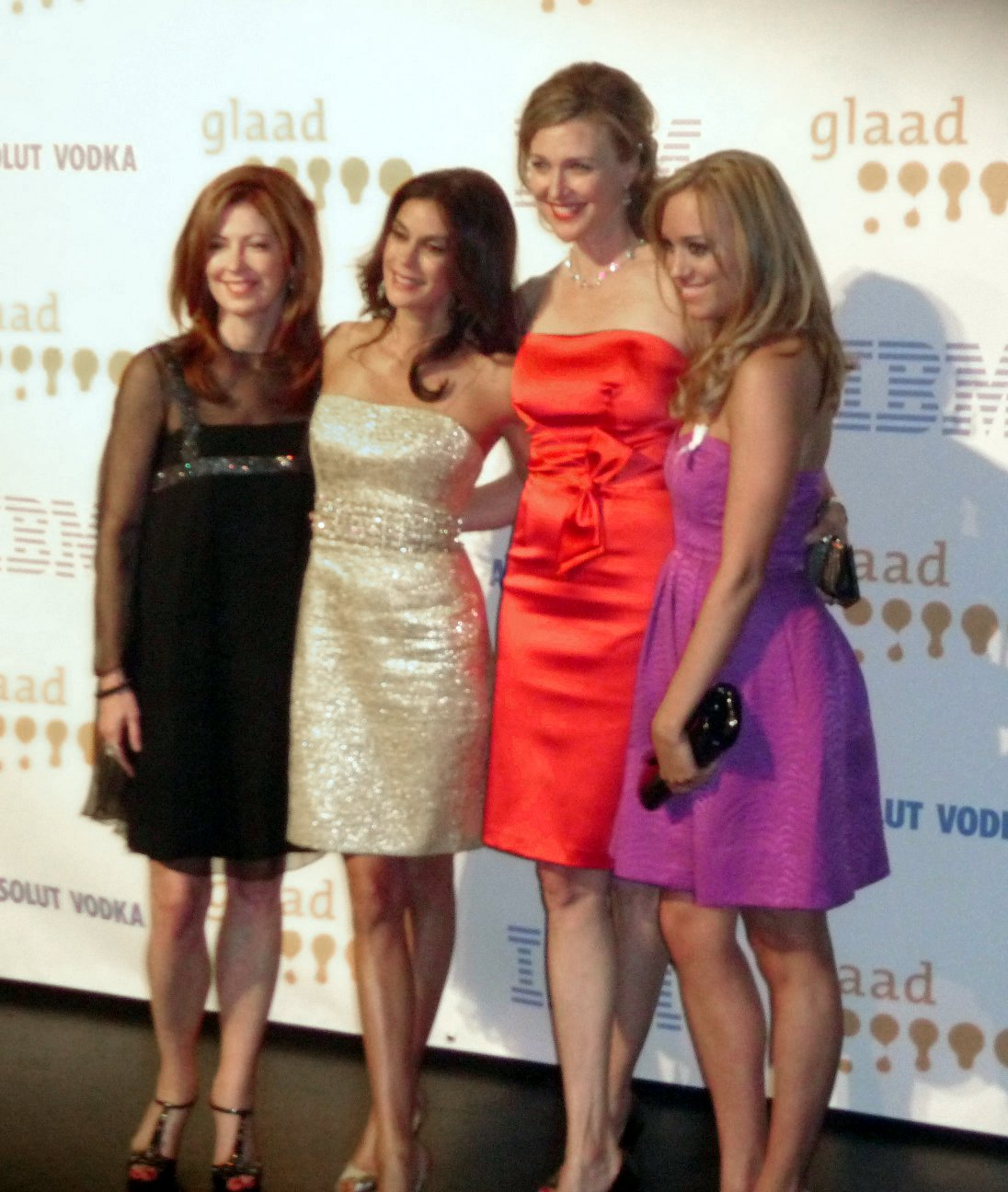
L–R: Dana Delany, Teri Hatcher, Brenda Strong and Andrea Bowen at the 20th GLAAD Media Awards at the Nokia Theatre in Los Angeles, California on April 18, 2009

For its premiere season, the show was awarded seven Primetime Emmy Awards, two Golden Globe Awards and two Screen Actors Guild Awards. The nominations of all of the leading actresses except Eva Longoria for both the Golden Globe Award and Primetime Emmy Award received some media interest. While Longoria seemingly wasn't bothered, stating for the press that "I'm new. I just arrived. I didn't expect at all to be in the minds of the Academy", Marc Cherry regarded them being left out as a "horrendous error". In the end, the Primetime Emmy Award for Outstanding Lead Actress in a Comedy Series went to Felicity Huffman, while Teri Hatcher won the Golden Globe Award for Best Actress – Musical or Comedy, as well as the Screen Actors Guild Award for Outstanding Actress – Comedy Series.

The show's second Golden Globe Award for its first year was for Best Series – Musical or Comedy at the 62nd Golden Globe Awards, while the other Primetime Emmy Awards went to Kathryn Joosten, for Outstanding Guest Actress in a Comedy Series, for her guest role as Karen McCluskey (beating, among others, fellow cast member Lupe Ontiveros); to Charles McDougall, for Outstanding Directing for a Comedy Series, for his direction of "Pilot"; to Danny Elfman, for Outstanding Main Title Theme Music, for his theme music; for Outstanding Single-Camera Picture Editing for a Comedy Series of "Pilot"; and for Outstanding Casting for a Comedy Series at the 57th Annual Primetime Emmy Awards. The entire cast was awarded the Screen Actors Guild Award for Outstanding Cast – Comedy Series (in both 2004 and 2005), and Nicollette Sheridan was nominated for the Golden Globe Award for Best Supporting Actress – Series, Miniseries or Television Film.

In 2006, the show continued to receive several nominations. It was awarded with yet another Golden Globe Award for Best Series – Musical or Comedy at the 63rd Golden Globe Awards, and all the four leading women received Golden Globe Award nominations, although none of them won. The cast ensemble was awarded with another Screen Actors Guild Award, as was Felicity Huffman. Primetime Emmy Award nominations at the 58th Primetime Emmy Awards included, among others, guest actress Shirley Knight and supporting actress Alfre Woodard, although none of them resulted in a win. It was nominated for the Pioneer Award at the BAFTA awards but lost to Doctor Who, which at the time was recently revamped.

The show did continue to be nominated in 2007—Felicity Huffman was granted a Primetime Emmy Award nomination for the second time, and guest actresses Laurie Metcalf and Dixie Carter also received Primetime Emmy Award nominations, at the 59th Primetime Emmy Awards. The show, along with actresses Marcia Cross and Felicity Huffman, received Golden Globe Award nominations at 64th Golden Globe Awards, and Huffman and the cast ensemble were also nominated for the Screen Actors Guild Awards. None of the Primetime Emmy Award, Golden Globe Award, or Screen Actors Guild Award nominations resulted in any actual awards.

2008 yielded the least nominations with none at the 65th Golden Globe Awards and only the cast being nominated at the Screen Actors Guild Awards. The show was nominated for four Primetime Emmy Awards at the 60th Primetime Emmy Awards, including acting nods towards Polly Bergen and Kathryn Joosten for Outstanding Guest Actress in a Comedy Series. Joosten won the show's seventh Primetime Emmy Award and first since its debut year.

Nominations continued to decline in later years. Notable nominations included nods towards Beau Bridges and Kathryn Joosten in 2009 and 2010, respectively. Additionally, Brenda Strong received her first Primetime Emmy Award nomination for Outstanding Voice-Over Performance at the 63rd Primetime Emmy Awards in 2011, a notable feat for a category usually dominated by animated series. Also in 2011, Vanessa L. Williams won an NAACP Image Award for Outstanding Actress in a Comedy Series at the 41st NAACP Image Awards and a Satellite Award for Best Actress in a Supporting Role in a Series, Mini-Series or Motion Picture Made for Television. Strong and Joosten received Primetime Emmy Award nominations again at 64th Primetime Emmy Awards in 2012 and Williams won an NAACP Image Award for Outstanding Supporting Actress in a Comedy Series for the series' eight and final season in 2013.

Other notable awards include the People's Choice Award for Favorite New Television Drama at the 31st People's Choice Awards, the Future Classic Award at the 2005 TV Land Awards, the TP de Oro for Best Foreign Series in 2006, and seven Golden Nymph Awards at Monte-Carlo Television Festivals, among others.

== Broadcast ==
From 2006 to 2012, it was syndicated on Lifetime in the United States. While the series doesn't air in the United States anymore, it still airs reruns internationally on channels such as Star World in the Middle East and Sky One, Sky Comedy and Universal TV in Germany.

Internationally, the show aired on networks such as: OSN Series First and Showtime Arabia in the Middle East, CTV in Canada, Seven Network in Australia, n(Poland) in Poland, CNBC-e in Turkey, Fox Life in Italy, Portugal, Greece and Poland, RÚV in Iceland, Top Channel in Albania, RTE Two in Ireland, M-Net in Africa, TV2 in New Zealand, SF2 in Switzerland, ORF1 in Austria, ProSieben in Germany, Sony Entertainment Television in Latin America, TV 2 in Norway, Nelonen in Finland, 8TV in Malaysia, Channel 4, S4C, and E4 in the United Kingdom, yes stars 1 in Israel, La 2 in Spain, TV2 in Hungary, TV Azteca in Mexico, Star World in Asia, Studio 23 in the Philippines, BTV in Bulgaria, Polsat in Poland, TV3 in Latvia and Lithuania, Channel 5 in Singapore, RTS in Serbia, Canal+ and M6 in France, POPTV in Slovenia and A1 Televizija in North Macedonia.

== Home media and digital downloads ==
There have only been DVD releases of the series. On Prime Video and Hulu, the series is available for streaming in 1080p HD; otherwise for offline viewing, all episodes of the show can be purchased from Prime Video, Google Play or Vudu. It is also available on Disney+ in countries that have the Star brand, but not released on Blu-ray since then.

The Complete Collection has an extended version of the series finale, bringing the total number of episodes with extended versions to seven.

Title	Region 1	Region 2	Region 3	Region 4	Region 5	No. of discs	No. of episodes	Ref.
The Complete First Season	September 20, 2005	October 10, 2005	November 16, 2005	November 28, 2005	July 18, 2006	6; 5 (Region 5)	23	
The Complete Second Season – The Extra Juicy Edition	August 30, 2006	November 13, 2006	November 8, 2006	October 4, 2006	June 28, 2007	6 (Regions 1 and 5); 7 (Regions 2, 3 and 4)	24	
The Complete Seasons 1–2	—N/a	November 13, 2006	—N/a	October 24, 2006	—N/a	13	47	
The Complete Third Season – The Dirty Laundry Edition	September 4, 2007	November 5, 2007	October 30, 2007	October 17, 2007	April 12, 2011	6	23	
The Complete Seasons 1–3	—N/a	November 19, 2007	—N/a			19	70	
The Complete Fourth Season – Sizzling Secrets Edition	September 2, 2008	November 3, 2008	November 6, 2008	October 29, 2008	April 12, 2011	5	17	
The Complete Seasons 1–4	—N/a	November 3, 2008	—N/a			24	87	
The Complete Fifth Season – The Red Hot Edition	September 1, 2009	November 9, 2009	November 3, 2009	October 21, 2009	April 26, 2011	7; 6 (Region 5)	24	
The Complete Seasons 1–5	—N/a	November 9, 2009	—N/a			31	111	
The Complete Sixth Season – The All Mighty Edition	September 21, 2010	October 4, 2010	September 21, 2010	October 20, 2010	April 26, 2011	5; 6 (Region 3)	23	
The Complete Seasons 1–6	—N/a	October 4, 2010	—N/a	October 20, 2010	—N/a	36 (Region 2); 37 (Region 4)	134	
The Complete Seventh Season – Wild, Wild Wisteria Edition	August 30, 2011	October 31, 2011	October 4, 2011	November 30, 2011	May 15, 2012	5	23	
The Complete Seasons 1–7	—N/a	October 31, 2011	—N/a			41	157	
The Complete Eighth and Final Season	September 25, 2012	September 24, 2012	October 12, 2012	October 3, 2012	—N/a	5	23	
The Complete Collection	September 25, 2012	September 24, 2012	December 7, 2012	—N/a		45	180	

== Merchandise ==
=== Games ===
Buena Vista Games released the life simulation computer video game Desperate Housewives: The Game on October 5, 2006, in North America, featuring an original story line spanning 12 episodes. The game is set on Wisteria Lane, but the player does not play as any of the housewives, although they frequently appear. A couple of months later, Gameloft released a mobile game based on the series. "The inspiration for Gameloft's take on Desperate Housewives comes from the most unlikely place, too—the original Mario Party on the Nintendo 64."

In 2007, British company Re:creation published Desperate Housewives Dirty Laundry Game, a board game based on the third season of Desperate Housewives. Players attempt to guess their opponents' secrets by answering trivia questions, while keeping clues to their own secrets concealed.

In June 2017, Megazebra released Desperate Housewives: The Game on App Store and on Google Play. Play as new neighbor on Wisteria Lane.

=== Soundtrack and literature ===
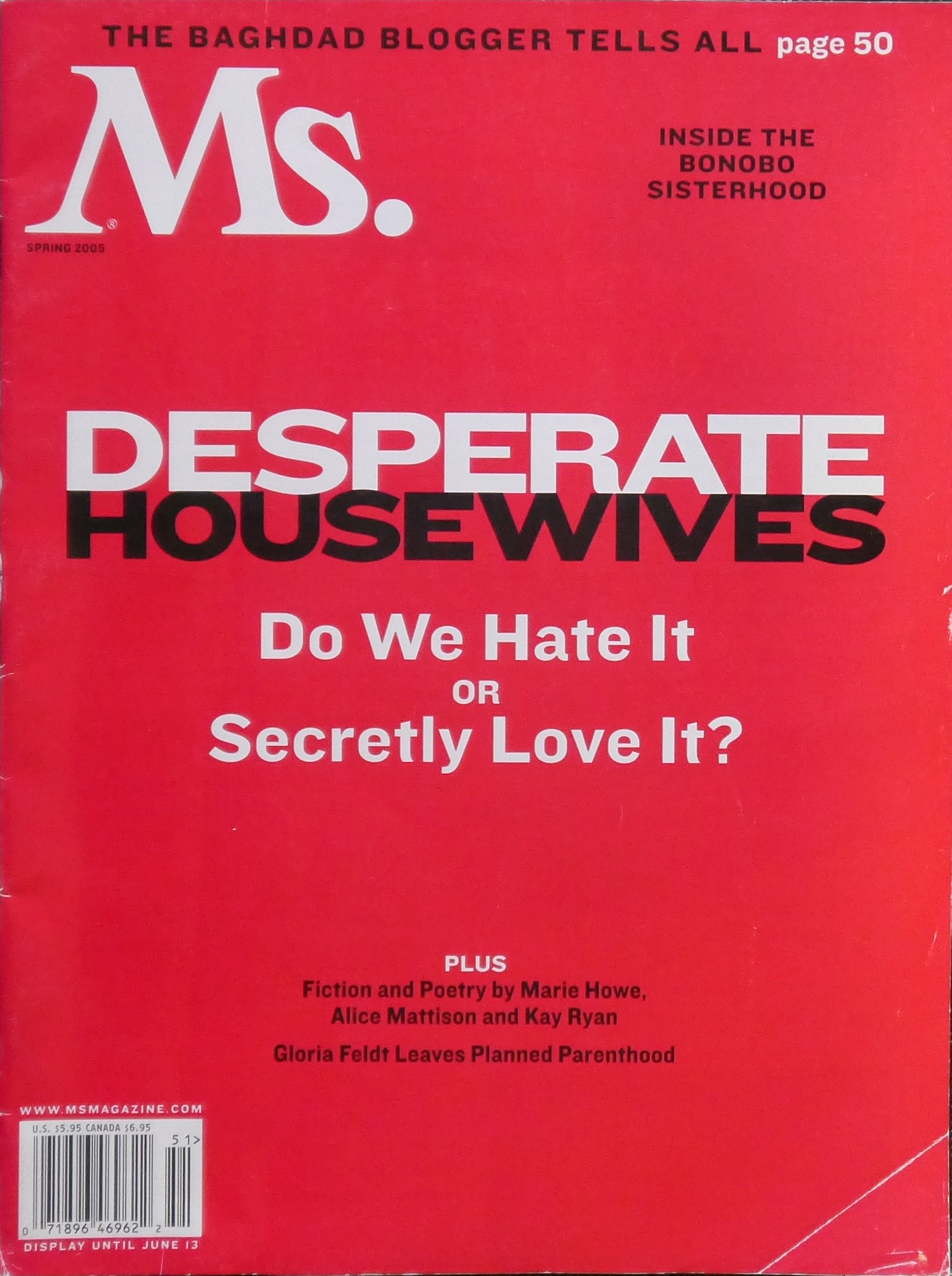
Ms.'s Desperate Housewives issue, published in 2005

In September 2005, Hollywood Records released a soundtrack album distributed by Universal Music Group, Music from and Inspired by Desperate Housewives, featuring music inspired by the series, as well as sound clips taken from the first season of the series. The songs included have been described as promoting "girl power", and among the artists appearing—all being female—were LeAnn Rimes, Gloria Estefan and Shania Twain. Controversially, no music composed for the series was included on the album.

Two books have been officially released within the Desperate Housewives franchise. In September 2005, ABC's sister company Hyperion Books released Desperate Housewives: Behind Closed Doors (ISBN 978-1-4013-0826-1), a companion to the first season of the series, written by the production team behind the series. One year later, in October 2006, Hyperion published The Desperate Housewives Cookbook – Juicy Dishes and Saucy Bits (ISBN 978-1-4013-0277-1). In addition, official wall calendars, featuring shots taken from the series, were published by Andrews McMeel Publishing for 2006, 2007 and 2008.

Four unauthorized books written from different points of view were released in 2006. Delicious Housewives, A Novel of Erotica, by author Tamarias Tyree (ISBN 978-0-930865-79-5), from RSVP Press, is an erotic parody of the series featuring the housewives' sexual misadventures which eventually lead them to an appearance on the Jerry Springer Show.

Reading 'Desperate Housewives': Beyond the White Picket Fence (ISBN 978-1-84511-220-2), from I.B. Tauris, is an academic look at the show by film studies lecturers Janet McCabe and Kim Akass. Welcome to Wisteria Lane: On America's Favorite Desperate Housewives (ISBN 978-1-932100-79-2), published by BenBella Books, consists of seventeen essays written from a feminist perspective. In Chalice Press' Not-So-Desperate: Fantasy, Fact and Faith on Wisteria Lane (ISBN 0-8272-2513-X), author Shawnthea Monroe gives a Christian interpretation of the series. Also, following the "real life desperate housewives" phenomenon, several books have been released dealing with life strategies for contemporary women.

=== Fashion dolls and fragrances ===
In December 2006, it was announced that the characters of Susan, Lynette, Bree, Gabrielle and Edie were to be made into 16 inches (41 cm) tall fashion dolls, produced by Madame Alexander. In 2007, they were released in a limited edition of 300 pieces each. A fragrance was also launched by Coty Inc. in 2006, titled Forbidden Fruit, and was composed of orange blossom, peach, apple, lily, wisteria, jasmine, ylang-ylang, sandalwood, tonka bean, vanilla and cedar. In August 2009, a collection of four fragrances by LR Health & Beauty Systems, each based on and titled after a Desperate Housewives lead character, was presented: Susan's fragrance is composed of orange blossom, cedar, sandalwood and white musk, Lynette's fragrance is composed of cardamom, star jasmine and musk, Bree's fragrance is composed of green apple, white jasmine, raspberry, lily, amber and vanilla, and Gabrielle's fragrance is composed of raspberry, pineapple, rose, patchouli and blackberries.

=== Another Desperate Housewife commercials ===
In conjunction with season six, Marc Cherry was commissioned to write eight "mini-episodes" entitled Another Desperate Housewife. The episodes were written after the previous season's extensive product placement proved unpopular with the fans. The mini-episodes were written to advertise mobile phone company Sprint and involve just three characters. The two main characters are Stephanie (played by Rebecca Staab) and Lance (played by David Chisum) who have moved into the former house of Edie Britt after her death. The third character, Elsa, was Stephanie's friend. It is eventually revealed that Lance and Elsa have been having an affair. Stephanie finds out and tells Lance to break it off. Elsa suggests killing Stephanie, but Lance gets a text message indicating he's seeing another woman and a furious Elsa shoots him. In truth, Stephanie had sent the message herself. The final mini-episode has Elsa being arrested and Stephanie attracted to a handsome policeman at the scene. Each episode ends with a Mary Alice-like narration saying things such as "This is suspicion on the Now Network" or "This is betrayal on the Now Network."

=== Ask Desperate Housewives ===
For the sixth season of the series, ABC created "Ask Desperate Housewives" to promote their website. It was presented and sponsored by Sprint, and it was hosted by series creator, Marc Cherry. In each special, Marc Cherry and an actress/actor of the series would answer questions that fans submitted to abc.go.com.

== Sequel ==
In April 2025, it was reported that a new television series titled Wisteria Lane was in development at Onyx Collective. The project is described as a darkly comedic mystery-drama in the vein of Desperate Housewives, set on the same fictional street. The series is being written by Natalie Chaidez (The Flight Attendant) and executive produced by Kerry Washington through her production company Simpson Street, along with Pilar Savone and Stacey Sher. While the series will not feature the original cast members or characters, it is considered a spiritual successor to Desperate Housewives, focusing on a new group of five women navigating secrets and scandal behind the façade of suburban perfection.

Original Desperate Housewives creator Marc Cherry is not directly involved but is aware of the project and may participate in some capacity. The project marks the first official attempt to expand the Desperate Housewives franchise since the show concluded in 2012.

== Adaptations ==
On February 26, 2006, The Walt Disney Company announced that four South American versions of the show were about to begin production: one for Argentina, one for Colombia, one for Ecuador and one for Brazil. Later on, the Colombian and Ecuadorean productions merged, leaving three Latin American shows. The Argentine version, titled Amas de Casa Desesperadas, began being broadcast in 2006. The first year proved successful enough for a second season to begin production. The first season of the version for Colombia (RCN TV) and Ecuador (Teleamazonas), also titled Amas de Casa Desesperadas, began being broadcast in Ecuador in May 2007, and was broadcast five days a week. In addition, Donas de Casa Desesperadas began being broadcast on RedeTV! in 2008. The Turkish version titled Umutsuz Ev Kadınları aired on Kanal D in Turkey from 2011 until 2013 and on FOX Turkey from 2013 until 2014. In fall 2013, the Disney Media Distribution and the Nigerian television network EbonyLife TV announced that they were producing an African version of Desperate Housewives. The series, titled Desperate Housewives Africa, was scheduled to premiere in summer 2014 on EbonyLife TV. However, it aired its only season during 2015.

Title	Region(s)	Release	Network(s)
Amas de Casa Desesperadas	Argentina	2006–07	Canal 13
Amas de Casa Desesperadas	Colombia; Ecuador	2007	RCN TV (Colombia); Teleamazonas (Ecuador)
Donas de Casa Desesperadas	Brazil	2007–08	RedeTV!
Umutsuz Ev Kadınları	Turkey	2011–14	Kanal D (2011–13); FOX Turkey (2013–14)
Desperate Housewives Africa	Nigeria	2015	EbonyLife TV
Desperate Housewives: The Game		2017	Megazebra
