= Desperate Housewives: The Game (2006 video game) =

- Developer: Liquid Entertainment
- Publisher: Buena Vista Games (Note: Released under ABC brand)
- Platform: Windows
- Release: NA: October 2, 2006; EU: November 3, 2006; AU: November 16, 2006
- Genres: Life simulation, social simulation
- Mode: Single-player

Desperate Housewives: The Game is a life simulation adventure game developed by Liquid Entertainment and released by Buena Vista Games in 2006, in the style of The Sims games. It is based on the television series Desperate Housewives. The player takes the part of a housewife with amnesia who has recently moved with her husband and son to Wisteria Lane. The plot takes place over 12 episodes. The game features a script by Desperate Housewives writer Scott Sanford Tobis and voice acting by Brenda Strong. It achieved sales in excess of 400,000 copies by early 2009.

== Plot ==
The game begins when a family moves to Wisteria Lane: a successful doctor working at the Fairview Medical Center, a wife with a forgotten past after a jogging accident, and their son. In the game, the player takes on the role of the wife, and is able to customise her and build relationships with other characters. Edie Britt first introduces the wife to Wisteria Lane and visits Bree Van de Kamp, who invites her to gossip at her house along with Susan Mayer, Lynette Scavo and Gabrielle Solis. A pair of brothers then visit the player's house: Daniel Fox, a famous designer and his twin brother Frank Fox, who installs an Internet service in the player's computer. The player's character then progresses through episodes, completing tasks that range from gardening and cooking for player's family, to discovering the secrets of the neighborhood.

The player must battle off a love rival to her husband – his secretary Jackie Marlen who stops at no cost to get what she wants – and the cranky neighbor, Etta Davenport. She must also deal with the antics of her unruly 14-year-old son and the people around him. Other residents are not as nice as they seem when a private investigator, Erik Larsen, shows up in town alongside a shady businessman, Vincent Corsetti, who seems to have ulterior motives. In the end, their secrets are aired to the public and a desperate decision is made in a hostage situation.

The game features four possible endings. The player can decide to run away with Erik Larsen or Vincent Corsetti, or remain married to her husband. A fourth ending allows the player to shoot all three men.

== Reception ==
Reception

Aggregate score
Aggregator	Score
Metacritic	61/100

Review scores
Publication	Score
Computer Games Magazine	1/5
GamePro	3.25/5
GameSpot	6.5/10
GameZone	7.2/10
IGN	8.2/10
PALGN	7/10
PC Gamer (UK)	30%
PC Gamer (US)	85%
PC Zone	53%
X-Play	3/5
Entertainment Weekly	B
The Sydney Morning Herald	3.5/5

Desperate Housewives received "mixed" reviews according to the review aggregation website Metacritic. Some reviewers praised it as a well-written and faithful adaption of the television series; however, the game also attracted criticism for its derivative, simplistic gameplay and prominent product placement. The editors of PC Gamer US presented Desperate Housewives with their 2006 "Best Adventure Game" award. During the 10th Annual Interactive Achievement Awards, the Academy of Interactive Arts & Sciences nominated Desperate Housewives for "Outstanding Achievement in Character Performance - Female" (Brenda Strong as Mary Alice Young).

In the United States, Desperate Housewives: The Game debuted at #6 on the NPD Group's weekly computer game sales chart for the October 8–14 period. Tor Thorsen of GameSpot reported that the game "instantly became the subject of widespread derision" upon its announcement, but that its first-week placement suggested its "publisher may be having the last laugh". Desperate Housewives ultimately achieved sales in excess of 400,000 copies by January 2009.

== Future ==
On June 28, 2017, MegaZebra released an officially licensed mobile game also entitled Desperate Housewives: The Game. This episodic mystery game allows players to create their own housewife that has recently moved to Wisteria Lane, and acts as a prequel to the main television series. The game received its final update in February 2019.
