= Desperate Housewives: The Game (2017 video game) =

2017 role-playing mobile game

- Developer: megazebra
- Publisher: MegaZebra
- Platforms: iOS, Android
- Release: June 2017
- Genres: Casual, role-playing game

Desperate Housewives: The Game is a casual free-to-play role-playing game that was released on iOS in June 2017 by MegaZebra. Players step into the role of a new resident, who is a popular advice columnist. By building friendships with the Housewives and other residents on Wisteria Lane, the player explores her father’s past, to uncover the secret that is disrupting the idyllic life of wealthy suburbia. The game is a prequel to the TV series Desperate Housewives, produced by ABC Studios.

== Gameplay ==
While trying to find clues to a murder, the player's character meets various housewives and earns relationship points by interacting with them; these points allows her to reach new levels. The player will also earn diamonds, which can be used to buy energy and keep playing. Completing tasks within various episodes will let the player earn money, reputation points, and energy. Furthermore, clothes and furniture will be unlocked by progressing through the game and will let the player customize and decorate.

== Release ==
Desperate Housewives: The Game was released on iOS on June 29, 2017. The Android version was released on December 1.
