= Charles Mesure =

Australian actor

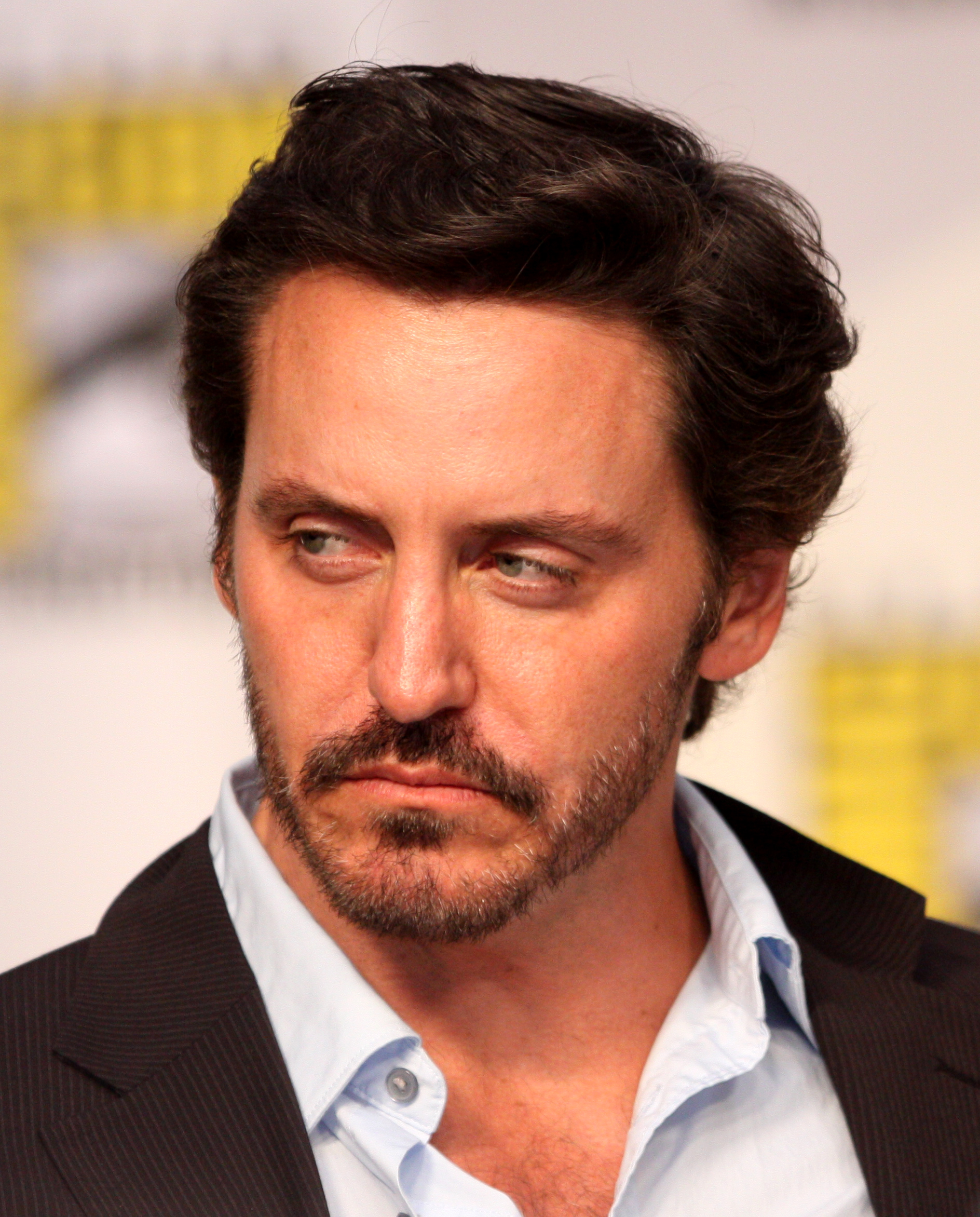
- Mesure at San Diego Comic-Con in July 2010
- Born: Charles William David Mesure; 12 August 1970 (age 56); Wells, Somerset, England
- Education: Newington College; NIDA
- Occupation: Actor
- Years active: 1997–present

Charles William David Mesure (born 12 August 1970) is a British-born Australian actor known for his work in Australia, New Zealand and the United States.

== Early life and education ==
Mesure was born in Wells, Somerset, England. When he was five, his family moved to Australia and he grew up in Sydney. Mesure attended Newington College (1982–1987) and graduated from the National Institute of Dramatic Art, Australia, with a degree in Performing Arts (Acting) in 1995.

== Career ==
In 1995, Mesure moved to New Zealand where he soon picked up a few acting roles. Mesure acted in, directed, designed and wrote upwards of thirty productions for the University of Sydney's Drama Society while studying law.

In 1998, he was nominated for a Best Actor New Zealand Television Award for his work as Ryan Waters on the New Zealand soap opera, City Life.

In 2003, he won the Best Supporting Actor award for his work as Kees Van Damm on the New Zealand drama, Street Legal. Mesure appeared as a supporting character in Season 1 of the American TV series V and was promoted to a regular series cast member for Season 2.

Mesure is known internationally for his role as Kyle Hobbes in the 2009 re-imagining of V and the archangel Michael in both the TV series Hercules: The Legendary Journeys and Xena: Warrior Princess. He has played guest roles on hit shows such as Lost, Without a Trace, Bones and Stacked. Mesure had a recurring role as the reporter JD Pollack on Crossing Jordan. He appeared in such feature films as Boogeyman, Mee-Shee: The Water Giant and Superfire.

In 2009, he played Detective-Sergeant Zane Gerard in the New Zealand drama Outrageous Fortune.

In 2010, he played Alec Ross, the lead character in Television New Zealand's new drama series, This Is Not My Life. He joined the final season cast of Desperate Housewives as Ben Faulkner, a contractor who shares a connection with Renee Perry (Vanessa Williams). He made a guest appearance on a 2013 episode of Burn Notice, playing the head of a criminal hacking syndicate.

On 30 March 2014, he played Edwin MacKaye in the episode called "Violets" on The Mentalist. From 2014 to 2018 he guest-starred in five episodes of Once Upon a Time, as the pirate Blackbeard.

In 2023, Mesure portrayed Henri Ducard in Gotham Knights and debuted as WSB agent Jack Brennan on General Hospital in December of that year. As of 4 February 2025, Mesure left his role on General Hospital. His last episode was on 30 January 2025 [9].

== Filmography ==
=== Film ===
Year	Title	Role	Notes
2005	Boogeyman	Mr. Jensen	
2005	Mee-Shee: The Water Giant	Watkins	
2013	Mis-drop	Sgt. Vaughn	Short film
2018	Occupation	Arnold	

=== Television ===
Year	Title	Role	Notes
1996–98	City Life	Ryan Waters	Main role
1997–98	Mirror, Mirror II	Matthew / Tobias	
1997	Xena: Warrior Princess	Darnelle	Episode: "The Dirty Half Dozen"
1997	Xena: Warrior Princess	Mercer	Episode: "The Price"
1997	Duggan	Billy Jamieson	Episode: "Death in Paradise"
1998	Hercules: The Legendary Journeys	Johnny Pinto	Episode: "Yes, Virginia, There Is a Hercules"
1998	Tiger Country	Constable Barry Gardener	Television film
1999	The Life & Times of Te Tutu		
1999	A Twist in the Tale	Nick Martinelli	Episode: "The Green Dress"
1999	Hercules: The Legendary Journeys	Archangel Michael	Episode: "Revelations"
1999–2001	Xena: Warrior Princess	Archangel Michael	5 episodes
2000–03	Street Legal	DSS Kees Van Damm	Main role; also writer of 7 episodes
2002	Superfire	Trent Holbrook	Television film
2003	Skin and Bone	Clean	Television film
2005	Briar & Graves	Father Malachi Briar	Unaired television pilot
2005	Lost	Bryan	Episode: "Hearts and Minds"
2005	Stacked	Eddie	2 episodes
2005	Without a Trace	Emil Dornvald	2 episodes
2005–07	Crossing Jordan	J.D. Pollack	Recurring role, 12 episodes
2006	Bones	Pete Sanders	Episode: "Aliens in a Spaceship"
2006	Cold Case	Tom McCree	Episode: "Forever Blue"
2007	Ghost Whisperer	The Messenger	Episode: "The Gathering"
2007	Las Vegas	Paul Grant	Episode: "It's Not Easy Being Green"
2009–10	Outrageous Fortune	DS Zane Gerard	Recurring role, 14 episodes
2010–11	V	Kyle Hobbes	Recurring role (season 1); main role (season 2); 18 episodes
2010	Kaitangata Twitch	Carey Gallagher	Main role, 13 episodes
2010	This Is Not My Life	Alec Ross	Main role, 13 episodes
2011–12	Desperate Housewives	Ben Faulkner	Main role (season 8), 15 episodes
2013	Agatha Christie's Marple	Greg Dyson	Episode: "A Caribbean Mystery"
2013	Burn Notice	Jack Frakes	Episode: "All or Nothing"
2014	The Mentalist	Edwin MacKaye	Episode: "Violets"
2014–18	Once Upon a Time	Blackbeard	Season 3 (2 episodes), season 4 (2 episodes), season 6 (1 episode), season 7 (1 episode)
2014–16	Girlfriends' Guide to Divorce	Ralf	Recurring role, 5 episodes
2015	Castle	Liam Hollister	Episode: "The Nose"
2015–20	The Magicians	The Beast	Recurring role
2016	Criminal Minds	Edgar Solomon	Episode: "Derek"
2016	Blue Bloods	Garda Commissioner Farrelly	Episode: "Down the Rabbit Hole"
2016	Dead of Summer	Sheriff Boyd Heelen/The Teacher	Recurring role
2023	Gotham Knights	Henri Ducard	Episode: "Night of Owls"
2023-25	General Hospital	Jack Brennan	
