= 20th GLAAD Media Awards =

Annual US media awards ceremony

The 20th GLAAD Media Awards took place in 2009. They are given out by the Gay & Lesbian Alliance Against Defamation each year to recognize and honor the mainstream media for their fair, accurate and inclusive representations of the LGBT community and the issues that affect their lives. Events were held at the Marriott Marquis in New York City on March 28, at the Nokia Theatre in Los Angeles on April 18, and at the Hilton Towers in San Francisco on May 9, 2009.

== New York City ==
Awards were handed out in the following categories:

- Excellence in Media Award - Tyra Banks
- Vito Russo Award - Suze Orman
- Special Recognition - Phil Donahue
- Special Recognition - "The Laramie Project, 10 Years Later: The Lasting Legacy of Matthew Shepard (The Derek and Romaine Show , Sirius XM Radio)
- Outstanding Newspaper, Overall Coverage - The New York Times
- Outstanding Documentary - A Jihad for Love
- Outstanding Magazine, Overall Coverage - Newsweek
- Outstanding Daily Drama - As the World Turns
- Outstanding TV Journalism Segment - "Special Comment: Gay Marriage is a Question of Love", Countdown with Keith Olbermann
- Outstanding Film, Limited Release - (tie) Noah's Arc: Jumping the Broom and Shelter
- Outstanding Music Artist - k.d. lang, Watershed
- Outstanding New York Theater, Broadway and Off-Broadway: Wig Out! by Tarell Alvin McCraney
- Outstanding Spanish Language Magazine, Overall Coverage - People en Español
- Outstanding Digital Journalism Article - "Gay Athletes Are Making Their Mark", LZ Granderson (ESPN.com)
- Outstanding Newspaper Columnist / Leonard Pitts Jr., The Miami Herald

== Los Angeles ==
- Vanguard Award - Kathy Griffin
- Stephen F. Kolzak Award - Bishop Gene Robinson
- Special Recognition - The L Word
- Special Recognition - Prop 8: The Musical
- Outstanding Film, Wide Release - Milk
- Outstanding Comedy Series - Desperate Housewives
- Outstanding Individual Episode, Comedy - "Unidentified Funk", The New Adventures of Old Christine
- Outstanding L.A. Theatre - Secrets of the Trade by Jonathan Tolins
- Outstanding Episode, Talk Show - "Ellen & Portia's Wedding Day", The Ellen DeGeneres Show
- Outstanding Spanish Language Journalism - "A juzgar por las apariencias" and "En otro cuerpo", Aquí y Ahora (Univision)
- Outstanding Drama Series - Brothers & Sisters

== San Francisco ==
- Davidson/Valentini Award - Chad Allen
- Special Recognition - Lucía Méndez
- Special Recognition - Geoff Callan and Mike Shaw, Pursuit of Equality
- Special Recognition - Dustin Lance Black
- Outstanding Television Movie - East Side Story
- Outstanding Reality Program - (tie) I Want to Work for Diddy (for including Laverne Cox) and Transamerican Love Story
- Outstanding TV Journalism, Newsmagazine - "Funding the Marriage War", In the Life

== See also ==
- GLAAD Media Awards
