= Renee Perry =

Fictional character on Desperate Housewives

- Desperate Housewives character
- Vanessa Williams as Renee Perry
- Portrayed by: Vanessa Williams
- Duration: 2010–12
- First appearance: "Remember Paul?"; 7x01, September 26, 2010
- Last appearance: "Finishing The Hat"; 8x23, May 13, 2012
- Created by: Marc Cherry
In-universe information
- Occupation: Interior designer
- Parents: Unnamed mother (died by suicide)
- Siblings: Unnamed sister
- Husband: Doug Perry (m. 2005; div. 2015) Ben Faulkner (m. 2017)

Renee Perry is a fictional character created by television producer and screenwriter Marc Cherry for the ABC television series Desperate Housewives. She is portrayed by Vanessa Williams, and is the second African-American housewife to be a major character.

== Casting ==
The addition of Vanessa Williams to the cast was announced after the close of the series' sixth season, as well as the finale of the ABC series Ugly Betty, in which Williams starred as Wilhelmina Slater. The character, who was originally named Renee Filmore-Jones, was conceived as a trouble-making vixen, similar to the Edie Britt character (Nicollette Sheridan), who appeared on the series until the fifth season. Following the casting announcement, Williams admitted to having been a fan of the series during its first year, but stopped watching because of the racially insensitive second season mystery storyline. It focused on Betty Applewhite (Alfre Woodard), the series' first black main character. Williams explained to Entertainment Weekly, "[Betty] had her son in chains in the basement. It was like, 'Really? Do we have to go there with our first Black character?' I honestly fell off the show after that. I think it was just so implausible and just an image that Black folks don't want to see their child chained and shackled in the basement." Cast member Felicity Huffman commented on Williams' addition to the cast, saying "She's such a great dash of vinegar to Wisteria Lane! It's going brilliantly—she's a wonderful woman, she's really smart, she's really strong, a real team player. She's a great addition."

== Storylines ==
=== Backstory ===
Renee was born in 1962. Since childhood, she has had fear of dwarfs because of an unspecified incident. She also has a sister. Their mother tried to commit suicide twice. Renee saved her once when her mother overdosed on pills, but in her second (successful) attempt Renee's mother used a gun. She left her a note which said "I am sorry". Since that time, Renee and her sister stayed with poor relatives, seeking help in charity organizations, which Renee hated. Around 1990 year she met Lynette Lindquist at Northwestern University and they became best friends. In 1997 Renee and Tom Scavo had a one-night-stand, during the short time when he broke off his engagement with Lynette. In 2005 Renee married Doug Perry. She had dreams about having a daughter, but unfortunately that never happened. While married, she met Donald Trump and frequently brought Lynette to New York City every year to have fun

=== Season 7 ===
Renee Perry arrives in Fairview to visit Lynette and her family. Renee speaks of her exciting life as the rich wife of professional baseball player Doug Perry (Reggie Austin). She and Lynette banter but it soon turns hurtful with Renee insulting her in front of the other women, telling Lynette she has not succeeded in life and has let herself be tied down to a suburban life. Lynette decides to throw Renee out, but Renee then confesses to Lynette that Doug is divorcing her. Feeling bad, Lynette tells Renee she can stay. Lynette assumes Renee will eventually go back to New York, but instead, she rents Edie's old house. Tom and Renee share a secret that Tom insists Lynette can never know about.

Renee and Bree Van de Kamp (Marcia Cross) go out clubbing and Renee ends up going home with Bree's handyman Keith Watson (Brian Austin Green). Bree, feeling jealous, calls Keith and tells him she needs him to fix her sprinklers. Renee is furious that Bree stole Keith out of her bed and tells her she will enjoy taking her down. Renee learns Bree is a grandmother and uses the fact to her advantage, trying to sabotage Bree's relationship with Keith. Bree gets back at Renee by ruining her date with Keith. Renee realizes that Bree likes Keith more and the two women make peace.

Renee has Gabrielle Solis (Eva Longoria) over for drinks to celebrate her $8 million divorce settlement. Gaby reveals that she has had a nose job and Renee reveals that she slept with her husband's divorce attorney to get the settlement. Renee then tells the women about Gaby's nose job. Doug then pays Renee a visit and tells her he wants her back. Gaby, furious at Renee for mocking her about her nose-job, tells Doug that Renee slept with his lawyer. Renee and Gaby get into a cat fight in the middle of a cabaret show and Renee ends up punching Gaby in the face. Doug calls Renee the next day and tells her they are even now and that he still wants her back. Renee decides not to get back together with Doug. Later in the season, Renee finds out that Doug is getting married again.

Susan Delfino (Teri Hatcher) overhears Renee crying and feeling sorry for her invites her to dinner. As Renee can't stand Susan she is not excited to go but since she has nothing better to do, the two go out for her birthday. During dinner, Renee reveals that she is still in love with a guy that she had an affair with 20 years ago. Later that night, when Renee is drunk and about to fall asleep, she tells Susan that Tom Scavo is the guy. Susan tells Tom that she knows about the affair and suggest that Tom ask Renee to move off the Lane or she will tell Lynette. Renee is furious when she finds out and tells Susan that it's none of her business and that she's not moving. Renee eventually tells Lynette about the affair. Apparently, Tom and Lynette had briefly broken up during this time. Lynette feels betrayed by both of them but eventually decides to forgive them.

Renee is next furious that Bob Hunter and Lee McDermott (respectively Tuc Watkins and Kevin Rahm) did not hire her as their new interior designer after they announced plans to renovate a room for their adoptive daughter. They decide to give Renee a chance even though she is not maternal and end up being amazed at Renee's design. Renee reveals that she once thought about having children of her own. Renee then decides she wants to adopt a baby, but Lynette plots to stop her. While babysitting Paige Scavo, Renee goes on a date and pays the waitress to take care of the baby. Lynette figures it out and points out that Renee is obviously not ready to be a mother.

When Beth Young (Emily Bergl) shoots herself, Renee insists on going through with a party despite everyone saying it's in poor taste. Gaby attends the party, which is basically just people who work in the neighborhood, and chastises Renee for this. Renee fires back at how selfish Beth was for taking her life and Gaby realizes that Renee's mother killed herself. Renee explains that she holds the party every year on the same day to show that she chooses life.

=== Season 8 ===
When a new neighbor, Ben Faulkner (Charles Mesure) moves into town, Renee sets her sights on him. She goes over to his place and offers him sex, confident that he will accept. To her surprise, Ben turns her down flat. After discovering he has a soft spot for the elderly, Renee enlists the aid of Karen McCluskey (Kathryn Joosten), making it appear that Renee is a good friend of hers which Ben witnesses. However, when Ben brings Renee to a senior center, an elderly woman reveals to Renee that Ben is onto her game causing her to flee in frustration. As Ben chases after her, she confesses how she despises charity, and that after her mother's suicide Renee was bounced around from various relatives and had to depend on charity. Ben reveals he too hates charity but does it out of a similar experience, bringing them closer together.

Weeks later Ben comes over to ask out Renee on a proper date. After she makes him beg on his hands and knees, she accepts. That night, Renee takes a few swigs from a bottle of love potion and just when things are heating up on the couch, her throat starts to close up. The severe rash on her face then scares away young trick-or-treaters, and finally Ben takes her to the hospital. Ben comes in to visit. Renee confesses she wanted everything to be special for her and Ben's first night together. When Renee sees Ben hugging Bree outside her house, she assumes Ben is having an affair with her. Renee decides to surprise him one night but he isn't home. She sees Bree leaving her house and drive away so she follows her to a motel. Thinking Bree was there with Ben, she bursts in and starts accusing Bree of trying to steal Ben from her. She then notices Bree's gun and she realized Bree was there alone and about to commit suicide. Later, Renee tells Bree about her mother's suicide and how it affected her.

When Ben finds himself in financial troubles, he asks Renee to marry him, knowing she's rich. Renee accepts but Ben has second thoughts and tells her he needs her for her money. Renee is hurt and breaks it off with him. Mike Delfino (James Denton) tells Renee that Ben borrowed money from a loan shark, but cannot pay him back. Renee goes to see Ben to offer her help, but he does not want it. She ends up paying off the loan shark anyway hoping that would be the end of Ben's problems. Ben is not too happy to learn that Renee paid him off but she tells Ben she does what she wants. The loan shark harasses Renee, trying to extort more money out of her. She tells him she will not be intimidated by him. Mike gets into a fight with the loan shark, and a few days later, the loan shark shoots and kills him. Just as Ben is about to propose to Renee, the police pay him a visit. They ask Ben about a dead body found at his construction site. Frustrated with the police being there, Renee accepts Ben's proposal without Ben really asking her.

After finding a subpoena in Ben's belongings, Renee realizes he is hiding something and that it has something to do with the body. Ben refuses to tell her the truth and claims it is for her own protection. The truth was that Ben had helped Bree bury the body of Gaby's stepfather. At Bree's murder trial, Ben refuses to testify so he is arrested, forcing Renee to testify against Bree. After Bree is exonerated, Renee apologizes for her damaging testimony and Bree forgives her. In the series finale, Renee gets ready to marry Ben. In the limo, Julie Mayer's (Andrea Bowen) water breaks and ruins Renee's wedding dress. Renee is furious and refuses to let the driver take Julie to the hospital. Renee has the driver stop by a shop where she and Gaby steal a new wedding dress. When they get back from the store, the limo is gone so Renee is forced to walk to her own wedding, in the wedding dress. In the end, Renee and Ben get married. Unlike the other housewives, her fate is left unknown.

== Reception ==
Moving the former Ugly Betty star [Vanessa Williams] onto ABC's Sunday-night franchise was a smart, smart move[...] That's not to say that our four principal actresses have stopped delivering. But let's be honest, new blood is a crucial ingredient for any soap to chug along into its seventh season.

— Tanner Stransky, Entertainment Weekly

Williams's portrayal of Renee Perry received mostly positive reviews among critics and fans. Following the eventual cancellation of Williams's previous show Ugly Betty where she starred as villain Wilhelmina Slater, it was immediately announced that Williams will be joining Desperate Housewives in its seventh season, many fans of the show anticipated her appearance shortly afterwards.

When the character finally made her debut appearance in the seventh season premiere "Remember Paul?", her performance received mixed reviews from critics. Tanner Stransky of Entertainment Weekly praised Williams' performance, stating that she brought back a "brand of bitchery" that had been missing from the series since Nicollette Sheridan's departure; additionally, he favorably compared the performance to Williams's portrayal of Wilhelmina Slater on Ugly Betty. Neal Justin of the Star Tribune commented that Vanessa Williams gave "a repeat performance" of her character on Ugly Betty. Isabelle Carreau of TV Squad praised Williams' performance, writing: "The banter between Lynette and Renee was priceless!" Damian Holbrook of TV Guide also drew a comparison between Williams' performances in the episode and on Ugly Betty, stating the two characters "have the same stiletto-sharp tongue and prickly chemistry with everyone who enters her orbit." John Griffiths of Us Weekly gave the character a negative review, commenting that Williams delivered an underwhelming performance.

When her character finally revealed her secret about having slept with Tom Scavo 20 years ago, critics praised the drama that surrounded her secret.
