= Michael Edelstein =

Michael Edelstein (born February 20, 1968) began his career in episodic television working CBS Entertainment. There he worked on a number of series on the network's primetime schedule such as CSI. He then went on to work for NBC Universal

Together with Marc Cherry and Tom Spezialy, Edelstein was one of the original executive producers for Desperate Housewives. The show won two Golden Globes for best comedy series and other nominations.

Edelstein has been executive producer for the thriller series Threat Matrix, and sitcom Hope & Faith, as well as telefilms Haunting Sarah, and Him and Us.

Edelstein worked on the 2009 space drama, Defying Gravity,

During his 7 years at NBC he worked with in-house production labels included Carnival which produced Downton Abbey, and Monkey Kingdom, which produced Made in Chelsea. Also Chocolate Media, a factual/entertainment label, and Lucky Giant, which specialises in comedy, notably Chris Guest's HBO/BBC television series Family Tree starring Chris O’Dowd.

Edelstein played a key role in identifying Matchbox Pictures, an Australian production company responsible for The Slap. Matchbox was acquired by NBCUniversal International Television Productions in 2013.

Edelstein was also involved in securing an equity stake in Canadian company Lark Productions, the producers responsible for Real Housewives of Vancouver.

On 13 April 2015, NBCUniversal, Mediengruppe RTL Deutschland and TF1 announced they had entered into an international co-production partnership to produce original US-style TV procedural dramas, including up to three new dramas over two years.

Edelstein was on the board of Working Title which produced drama and comedy programming for both UK and US broadcasters.

Edelstein left NBC Universal in 2017 with the end of his contract.
