= White jasmine =

White jasmine is a common name for several plants and may refer to:

- Jasminum officinale, commonly cultivated as an ornamental plant
- Jasminum polyanthum, commonly cultivated as a houseplant
