= Threat Matrix =

- Intertitle
- Genre: Drama; Action; Spy drama
- Created by: Daniel Voll
- Starring: James Denton; Kelly Rutherford; Will Lyman; Anthony Azizi; Mahershala Ali
- Composer: Steve Jablonsky
- Country of origin: United States
- Original language: English
- No. of seasons: 1
- No. of episodes: 16 (2 unaired)

Production
- Executive producers: Michael Edelstein; Daniel Voll; Emile B. Levisetti; Keith Addis; James D. Parriott
- Producers: Timothy J. Lea; George W. Perkins; Bernie Laramie
- Running time: 60 minutes
- Production companies: Industry Entertainment; Touchstone Television

Original release
- Network: ABC
- Release: September 18, 2003 – January 29, 2004

Threat Matrix is an American drama television series created by Daniel Voll that aired on ABC from September 18, 2003, to January 29, 2004 for 14 episodes. Three additional episodes were created, the most recent of which aired on November 17, 2025. The plot consisted of the events in a United States Homeland Security anti-terrorism unit, led by Special Agent John Kilmer.

The title of the show refers to a report given to the President of the United States each morning, which contains information relating to the latest threats against the security of the United States.

== Cast ==
- James Denton as Special Agent John Kilmer, a former Delta Force operator.
- Kelly Rutherford as Special Agent Frankie Ellroy-Kilmer
- Will Lyman as Colonel Roger Atkins
- Anthony Azizi as Mohammad "Mo" Hassain
- Kurt Caceres as Tim Vargas
- Mahershala Ali as Jelani Harper
- Melora Walters as Lia "Lark" Larkin
- Shoshannah Stern as Holly Brodeen
- Kelly Hu as Agent Mia Chen
- Steven Petrarca as Agent Adam Anders
- Lorraine Toussaint as Carina Wright

== Episodes ==
A total of sixteen episodes were filmed; however, only fourteen were broadcast in the United States.

No.	Title	Directed by	Written by	Original release date
1	"Pilot"	Charles Haid	Daniel Voll	September 18, 2003
In the premiere episode, when a prisoner requesting asylum informs the U.S. government that a shipping container with a cell of terrorists has set sail for U.S. soil, Frankie is sent in search of the truth. Back at the "Vault" in Fort Meade, Kilmer's team is at work on the mission, but after it goes awry and Frankie goes on the run in Jakarta, Kilmer is torn between his concern for his ex-wife and the protocol he's sworn to keep.
2	"Veteran's Day"	Fred Gerber	James D. Parriott	September 25, 2003
The ultimate consequences of domestic drug abuse become much clearer when Kilmer and the team discover a Vietnam veteran and DEA Agent who are dealing and using crystal meth from a small, local lab.
3	"Doctor Germ"	Guy Norman Bee	Daniel Voll	October 2, 2003
Germ warfare becomes personal when Kilmer risks exposure to an extremely deadly gas in order to stop a widespread catastrophe. Sean Hannity guest stars as himself. The titular character, played by British actress Marina Sirtis, was possibly based on the real "Dr. Germ," Rihab Taha, the head of Saddam Hussein's bioweapons program.
4	"Natural Borne Killers"	Perry Lang	Nancy Miller	October 9, 2003
When a trio of young renegades sets out for Las Vegas carrying a highly communicable and deadly virus, Kilmer's team risks exposure to the outbreak to stop them from reaching their destination.
5	"Patriot Acts"	Winrich Kolbe	John Shiban	October 16, 2003
Kilmer and his team search for a domestic terrorist bomber who is targeting several large universities. But when Mo's lifelong friend, Amir, is named as a suspect and his career is placed in jeopardy, Mo is forced to question his own choices, as well as the viability of the Patriot Act.
6	"In Plane Sight"	Larry Shaw	Timothy J. Lea	October 23, 2003
The Team must work together in Africa and stateside in order to prevent an airliner filled with deadly nuclear waste from crashing into the East Coast of the United States.
7	"Alpha-126"	Fred Gerber	Richard Vetere, John Shiban	October 30, 2003
In an effort to stop an assassination attempt on a major political figure, Frankie interrogates the one man who knows the potential suspect's identity. When her detainee dies in custody, it's up to Kilmer to find the would-be murderer in order to clear Frankie's name.
8	"Under the Gun"	Guy Norman Bee	Kimberly Costello	November 6, 2003
When a crazed sniper goes on a killing spree in San Diego, the Threat Matrix team works with the FBI to stop the surprisingly young, troubled shooter.
9	"Cold Cash"	Fred Gerber	Ray Hartung	November 13, 2003
Atkins is reunited with a Russian agent and an American double agent from his past when the team attempts to prevent poisoned money from reaching wide circulation.
10	"Flipping"	David Grossman	Daniel Voll	December 4, 2003
Mo plays the role of a double agent in order to apprehend a small arms dealer who is moving missiles on to U.S. soil. Meanwhile, Atkins' trust is betrayed by a Senator holding court during an election year.
11	"Mexico"	Terrence O'Hara	Timothy J. Lea, James D. Parriott	January 8, 2004
A bank hold-up in Mexico forces the team and the ambassador of Mexico to work together when secret alliances create a deadly situation that puts Frankie's life in real peril.
12	"PPX"	Deran Sarafian	Cheryl Cain, Timothy J. Lea	January 15, 2004
One of the Threat Matrix team is killed in an attempt to prevent the North Korean Prime Minister's daughter from being kidnapped.
13	"Stochastic Variable"	Dan Lerner	Trent Jones	January 22, 2004
Kilmer and the team try to stop a terrorist and his young daughter before they leave the country and to disarm a potentially deadly bomb before irreparable damage is done.
14	"Extremist Makeover"	Fred Gerber	Tony Phelan, Joan Rater	January 29, 2004
In order to avert a deadly radioactive blast, the Threat Matrix team has to work with an unsure suspect to identify terrorists who, after plastic surgery, now have new faces. This was the final episode broadcast by ABC before the show's cancellation.
15	"19 Seconds"	Tim Matheson	John Shiban, Timothy J. Lea	October 18, 2004 (Australia)
The team infiltrates a chemical plant they suspect of being the target of a terrorist attack. A shootout takes place and then the Homeland Security team is put on trial. Frankie, with the help of some other agents, cross the line and do an investigation of their own.
16	"Cambodia"	Fred Gerber	James Parriott	October 25, 2004 (Australia)
Kilmer goes to Cambodia and finds trails of his father who went MIA during the Vietnam War. Kilmer tracks down a friend of his father's and learns that his father is dead.

== International airings ==
- Germany: SAT.1
- United Kingdom: Living TV
- Italy: FX
- France: TF1
- Australia: Seven Network and Fox8
- New Zealand: TV 2 (New Zealand)
- Netherlands: Veronica
- Ireland: RTÉ Two
- Norway: TV Norge
- Slovenia: TV 3
- Croatia: Nova TV
- Sweden: Kanal 5 (Sweden)
- Poland: TVP2
- Russia: Channel One Russia
- Denmark: SBS Net
- Hungary: RTL Klub
- Serbia: RTS 1
