= MegaZebra =

German game development company

MegaZebra GmbH
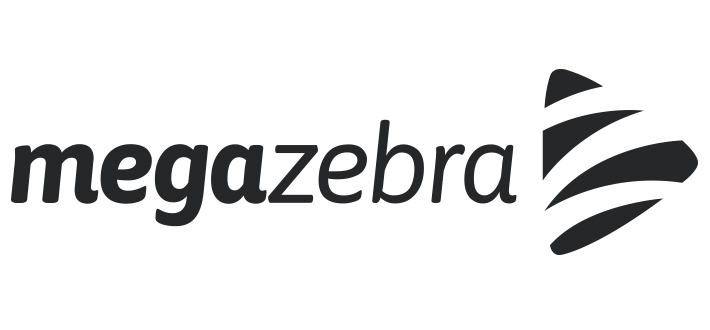
- Type: Private
- Industry: video games, social network service
- Founded: 2009
- Headquarters: Munich, Germany
- Key people: Henning Kosmack, CEO; Mark Gazecki, Chairman
- Number of employees: 55 (2021)
- Website: http://www.megazebra.com/

MegaZebra is a game development company located in Munich, Germany. The company develops free-to-play games for social networks like Facebook and mobile devices, such as smartphones and tablets. As of July 2018, the company employs 55 people.

== History ==
MegaZebra pioneered the social gaming space in Europe in late 2008. Behind MegaZebra is the team around Henning Kosmack (CEO) and Mark Gazecki (Chairman). Since then, MegaZebra developed several cross-platform games for mobile devices and social networks like Facebook.

In September 2009 the company got backed by the founders of Web.de through Kizoo Technology Ventures.

With Mahjong Trails they launched their first game, reaching more than two million monthly players in January 2011. Today the game has still more than 2 million monthly active players.

In March 2011 MegaZebra raised 'multiple millions Euros' in a second round of funding, led by Doughty Hanson Technology Ventures. Furthermore, Kizoo Technology Ventures participated again, alongside private investor Markus Stolz.

With Gaute Godager, founder of Funcom, and Jürgen Goeldner, two Gaming veterans joined the company`s board of directors in January 2012.
Both have a long-standing experience in the gaming sector. Apart from Goeldner and Godager, the MegaZebra board consists of Nigel Grierson from Doughty Hanson, Matthias Hornberger from Atevia, and Mark Gazecki of the founders.

MegaZebra launched its second hit game Solitaire Castle in late 2011. Following in the footsteps of Mahjong Trails, it reached more than 1.5 million monthly active users in October 2012 and more than 2 million in January 2013.

1 year later, MegaZebra launched Suburbia, which reached 2 million monthly active users in early 2014. With Suburbia, MegaZebra was the first company to combine episodic, TV-style content with simulation game mechanics. Currently, only 5 episodes are available, as the 6th episode has been in development for a few years

MegaZebra’s latest game, Solitaire Chronicles, is their first cross-platform title, as it is available on the web and on mobile devices. It has won a Tabby Award in the category "Best iPad game: Cards, Casino and Dice" in 2015.

== Figures ==
According to AppData, MegaZebra was one of the top 25 fastest growing developers in January 2011 on Facebook, reporting almost 4 million monthly users. Additionally, with more than half a million daily active users, MegaZebra was among the Top 3 European game developers in terms of daily active users.

== Games ==
- Desperate Housewives: The Game
- Mahjong Trails
- Suburbia 2
- Solitaire Chronicles
- Solitaire Castle
- Mahjong
