= Yasmin (name) =

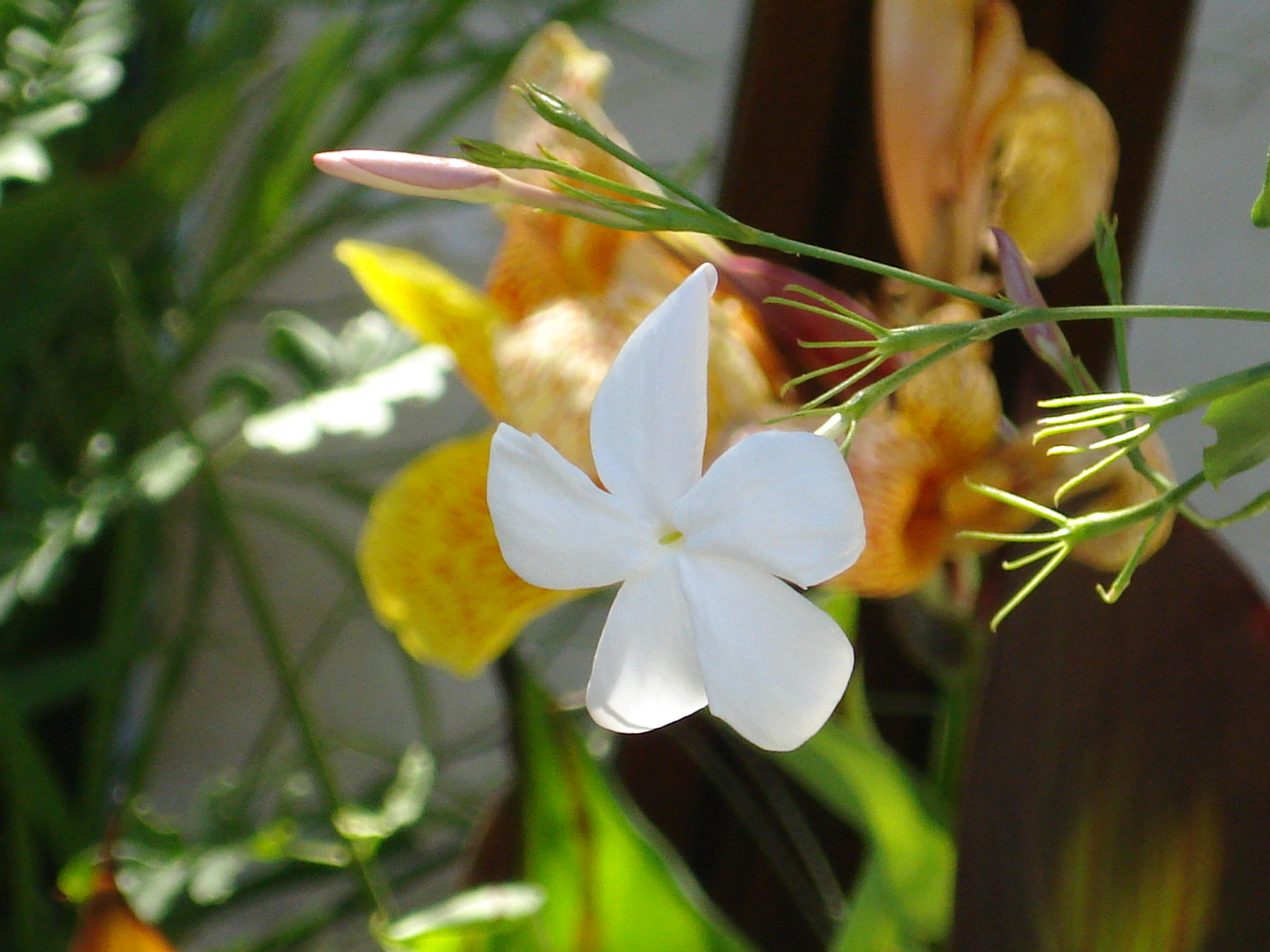
- Yasmin pictured
- Pronunciation: /ˈjɑːsmiːn/
- Gender: Female
- Language: Persian

Origin
- Origin: From the Persian word for Jasmine, Yas flower
- Region of origin: Iran

Other names
- Variant forms: Yasameen, Yasamin, Yasemin, Yasman, Yasmeen, Yasmeena, Yasmīn, Yasmina, Yasmine, Yasmīne, Yassamine, Yassmin, Yazmeen

Yasmin is a feminine given name of Persian origin (یاسمن), sometimes also used as a surname. Notable people with the name include:

== Etymology ==
Yasmin (یاسمن) is the Persian name for the flowering plant jasmine, from which the English name Jasmine also derives.

== Given name ==
=== Yasaman ===
- Yasaman Aryani, Iranian political prisoner
- Yasaman Farmani (born 1995), Iranian footballer
- Yasaman Farzan (born 1977), Iranian researcher

=== Yasameen ===
- Yasameen Al-Raimi (born 1985), Yemeni sports shooter

=== Yasamin ===
- Yasamin Mostofi, Iranian-American scientist

=== Yasemen ===
- Yasemen Bektaş (born 2003), Turkish badminton player
- Yasemen Saylar (born 1990), Turkish basketball player

=== Yasmeen ===
- Yasmeen Abutaleb, American author and journalist
- Yasmeen Sami Alamiri, Iraqi American journalist
- Yasmeena Ali (born 1993), British-Afghan pornographic actress
- Yasmeen Al-Dabbagh (born 1997), Saudi Olympic athlete
- Yasmeen Al-Farhan (born 2005), Saudi footballer
- Yasmeen Fayez (born 1989), Bahraini footballer
- Yasmeen Fletcher (born 2003), American actress
- Yasmeen Ghauri (born 1971), Canadian model
- Yasmeen Godder (born 1973), Israeli dancer and choreographer
- Yasmeen Hameed (born 1952), Pakistani Urdu poet
- Yasmeen Hassan (born 1969), Pakistani-American attorney and activist
- Yasmeen Ismail (1950–2002), Pakistani actress
- Yasmeen Khair (born 1987), Jordanian footballer
- Yasmeen Khan (actress) (1950–1999), Pakistani actress
- Yasmeen Khan (cricketer) (born 1999), Namibian cricketer
- Yasmeen Pir Mohammad Khan (born 1954), Pakistani politician
- Yasmeen Lari (born 1941), Pakistani architect
- Yasmeen Al Maimani, Saudi pilot
- Yasmeen Mjalli (born 1996), Palestinian-American fashion designer
- Yasmeen Murshed (born 1945), Bangladeshi politician
- Yasmeen Sulieman (born 1982), American singer
- Yasmeen Tahir (1937–2025), Pakistani actress
- Yasmeen Williams (born 1955), American gospel singer

=== Yasmin ===
- Yasmin (actress) (1936–2026), Pakistani actress
- Yasmin (musician) (born 1988), British DJ and singer-songwriter
- Yasmin Abbasey (born 1950), Pakistani judge
- Yasmin Abdulaziz (born 1980), Egyptian actress
- Yasmin Ahmad (1958–2009), Malaysian film director
- Yasmin Ali (born 1990), Egyptian singer
- Yasmin Alibhai-Brown (born 1949), Ugandan-born British journalist and author
- Yasmin Altwaijri, Saudi epidemiologist
- Yasmin Angoe, Ghanaian American writer
- Yasmin Bannerman (born 1972), English actress
- Yasmin Belo-Osagie, Nigerian businesswomen
- Yasmin Benoit (born 1996), English model and activist
- Yasmin Bevan (born 1953), English headteacher
- Yasmin Bibi, Pakistani politician
- Yasmin Le Bon (born 1964), British fashion model
- Yasmin Broom (born 1998), English singer and DJ
- Yasmin Brunet (born 1988), Brazilian model
- Yasmin Bunter (born 1992), English footballer
- Yasmin Catley (born 1967/68), Australian politician
- Yasmin Cosmann (born 2001), Brazilian footballer
- Yasmin Daji (born 1947), Indian model
- Yasmin Daswani (born 1994), English-born Hong Kong cricketer and lawyer
- Yasmin David (1939–2009), British landscape painter
- Yasmin Davies (born 2005), British actress
- Yasmin Deliz (born 1987), American reggaetón singer-songwriter, model, and actress
- Yasmin Duursma (born 2004), Australian rules footballer
- Yasmin Nasr Elgewily (born 2001), Egyptian karateka
- Yasmin Evans (born 1990), British TV and radio presenter
- Yasmin Fahimi (born 1967), German politician
- Yasmin Farooq (born 1965), American rower
- Yasmin Fedda, Palestinian filmmaker, artist, creative producer, and academic
- Yasmin Finney (born 2003), British actress and Internet personality
- Yasmin Fridman (born 1973), Israeli politician
- Yasmin Giger (born 1999), Swiss hurdler
- Yasmin Green, Iranian-born American businesswoman
- Yasmin Hachem (born 1996), Brazilian politician
- Yasmin Haque, Bangladeshi politician
- Yasmin Ali Haque, Bangladeshi human rights activist
- Yasmin Ara Haque, Bangladeshi politician
- Yasmin Harper (born 2000), British diver
- Yasmin Hayat (born 1990), English painter of miniatures
- Yasmin Hurd, American neuroscientists
- Yasmin Ingham (born 1997), British equestrian
- Yasmin Javadian (born 2000), British judoka
- Yasmin Jiwani, Canadian feminist academic and activist
- Yasmin Joseph (born 1991/92), British-Caribbean playwright and screenwriter
- Yasmin Jusu-Sheriff, Sierra Leonean lawyer and activist
- Yasmin K. (born 1986), German pop singer
- Yasmin Kaashoek (born 1999), British volleyball player
- Yasmin Kafai, German professor
- Yasmin Khakoo (born 1964), Indian-American pediatric neuro-oncologist
- Yasmin Khan (born 1977), British historian
- Yasmin Khan (writer) (born 1981), British author, broadcaster, and human rights campaigner
- Yasmin Aga Khan (born 1949), American Pakistani philanthropist
- Yasmin Al-Khudhairi (born 1994/95), British actress
- Yasmin Kwadwo (born 1990), German sprint athlete
- Yasmin Ladha (born 1958), Tanzanian-Canadian writer of Indian descent
- Yasmin Lee, Cambodian-American transgender pornographic film actress
- Yasmin Levy (born 1975), Israeli singer-songwriter of Sephardic music
- Yasmin Liverpool (born 1999), British 200m and 400m sprinter
- Yasmin Lucas (born 1990), Brazilian singer-songwriter
- Yasmin Lukatz (born 1972), Israeli venture capital investor, businesswoman, attorney, and social entrepreneur
- Yasmin Meakes (born 1994), Australian rugby union footballer
- Yasmín Mejías, Puerto Rican politician
- Yasmin Menezes (born 1998), Brazilian acrobatic gymnast
- Yasmin Miller (born 1995), British track and field athlete
- Yasmin Modassir (1953–2016), Indian academician and scientist
- Yasmin Mogahed (born 1980), American speaker
- Yasmin Mrabet (born 1999), footballer
- Yasmin Nayroukh, Palestinian football referee
- Yasmin Neal (born 1985), American politician
- Yasmin Paige (born 1991), English actress
- Yasmin Parsons (born 1993), English netball player
- Yasmin Pettet (born 2001), English television personality
- Yasmin Ponnappa, Indian model
- Yasmin Monet Prince (born 1998/99), British actress
- Yasmin al Qadhi (born 1986), Yemeni journalist
- Yasmin Qureshi (born 1963), British politician
- Yasmin Raeis (born 1985), Egyptian actress
- Yasmin Rashid (born 1950), Pakistani politician
- Yasmin Ratansi (born 1951), Canadian politician
- Yasmeen Rehman, Pakistani politician
- Yasmin Said (born 2000), Kenyan actress
- Yasmin Saikia, Indian-American writer and academic
- Yasmin Bilkis Sathi, Bangladeshi model
- Yasmin Schnack (born 1988), American tennis player
- Yasmin Seky (born 1998), Irish actress
- Yasmin Shariff (born 1956), Ugandan-born British architect, environmentalist, and university professor
- Yasmin Siraj (born 1996), American figure skater
- Yasmin Sison-Ching (born 1972), Filipino artist and painter
- Yasmin Sooka (born 1957), South African human rights lawyer and activist
- Yasmin Zammit Stevens (born 1993), Maltese weightlifter
- Yasmin Surveyor, Indian academic, banker, and social worker
- Yasmin Thayna (born 1993), Brazilian filmmaker
- Yasmin Tredell (born 1992), British rower
- Yasmin Trudeau (born 1983/84), American politician
- Yasmin Umar (born 1956), Bruneian aristocrat, politician, and military officer
- Yasmin Verheijen (born 1994), Dutch model
- Yasmin Vossoughian (born 1978), American journalist
- Yasmin Warsame (born 1976), Somali-Canadian model
- Yasmin Wijnaldum (born 1998), Dutch model
- Yasmin Williams (born 1997), American guitarist
- Yasmin Yusuff (born 1955), Malaysian singer
- Yasmin Zaher (born 1991), Palestinian journalist and writer
- Yasmin Zahran (born 1933), Palestinian writer and archeologist

=== Yasmina ===
- Yasmina El-Abd (born 2006), Egyptian actress and singer
- Yasmina Akrari (born 1993), Italian volleyball player
- Yasmina Azhari, Syrian businesswoman
- Yasmina Aziez (born 1991), French taekwondo athlete
- Yasmina Azzizi-Kettab (born 1966), Algerian heptathlete
- Yasmina Baddou (born 1962), Moroccan politician
- Yasmina Benslimane, Moroccan feminist activist
- Yasmina Kadyrova (born 2004), Russian pair skater
- Yasmina Khadra (born 1955), Algerian author
- Yasmina Mesfioui (born 1976), Moroccan sport shooter
- Yasmina Mkrtycheva (born 2008), Uzbek rhythmic gymnast
- Yasmina Omrani (born 1988), Algerian track and field athlete
- Yasmina Praderas (born 1981), Spanish sound engineer
- Yasmina Reza (born 1959), French Iranian playwright, actress, novelist, and screenwriter
- Yasmina Siadatan (born 1981), British businesswoman of Iranian descent
- Yasmina Traboulsi (born 1975), French writer
- Yasmina Zaytoun (born 2002), Lebanese beauty pageant titleholder

=== Yasmine ===
- Yasmine (singer) (1972–2009), Belgian singer, presenter, and television personality
- Yasmine Abderrahim (born 1999), Algerian volleyball player
- Yasmine Akram (born 1981), Irish-Pakistani actress
- Yasmine Allas (born 1967), Somali actress and writer
- Yasmine Amhis (born 1982), French-Algerian particle physicist
- Yasmine Arrington (born 1994), American model
- Yasmine Azaiez (born 1988), British-born violinist of Tunisian descent
- Yasmine Belkaid (born 1968), Algerian immunologist
- Yasmine Belmadi (1976–2009), French actor of Algerian origin
- Yasmine Bladelius (born 1988), Swedish politician
- Yasmine Bleeth (born 1968), American actress
- Yasmine Boudjenah (born 1970), French politician
- Yasmine Al-Bustami, American actress
- Yasmine Chouikh (born 1982), Algerian screenwriter, film director, and journalist
- Yasmine Daghfous (born 2000), Tunisian fencer
- Yasmine Eriksson (born 1989), Swedish politician
- Yasmine Fouad (born 1975), Egyptian politician
- Yasmine Gooneratne (1935–2024), Sri Lankan poet, short story writer, university professor, and essayist
- Yasmine Hamdan (born 1976), Lebanese singer
- Yasmine Hamza (born 2003), Italian badminton player
- Yasmine Helmi (born 1978), Egyptian sport shooter
- Yasmine Jemai (born 1999), Tunisian footballer
- Yasmine Kabbaj (born 2004), Moroccan tennis player
- Yasmine Kandil, Egyptian-Canadian professor
- Yasmine K. Kasem (born 1993), American visual artist
- Yasmine Kassari (born 1970), Belgian-Moroccan film director
- Yasmine Kherbache (born 1972), Belgian lawyer and politician
- Yasmine Khlat (born 1959), Lebanese actress and writer
- Yasmine Kittles, American musician, actress, and performance artist
- Yasmine Klai (born 2002), French-Tunisian footballer
- Yasmine Lafitte (born 1973), Moroccan and French pornographic actress
- Yasmine Mansouri (born 2001), French tennis player
- Yasmine Al Massri (born 1978), Palestinian-French actress, dancer, video artist, and human rights advocate
- Yasmine Mathurin, Haitian Canadian filmmaker
- Yasmine El-Mehairy, Egyptian entrepreneur
- Yasmine Mohammed, Canadian university instructor, human rights activist, and author
- Yasmine Motarjemi (born 1955), Swiss-Iranian food safety specialist and whistleblower
- Yasmine Mouttaki (born 1997), Moroccan boxer
- Yasmine Mustafa (born 1982), American CEO, entrepreneur, and activist
- Yasmine Naghdi (born 1992), British ballet dancer
- Yasmine Nayar (born 1990), Swiss-Algerian pop singer
- Yasmine Niazy (born 1985), Egyptian pop singer
- Yasmine d'Ouezzan (1913–1997), French carom billiards player
- Yasmine Pahlavi (born 1968), wife of Reza Pahlavi II, Crown Prince of Iran
- Yasmine Petty, American model
- Yasmine Posio (born 1974), Swedish politician
- Yasmine El Rashidi (born 1977), Egyptian author
- Yasmine Rostom (born 1993), Egyptian Olympic rhythmic gymnast
- Yasmine Ryan (1983–2017), New Zealand journalist
- Yasmine Sabri (born 1988), Egyptian actress and model
- Yasmine Seale (born 1989), British-Syrian writer and literary translator
- Yasmine Zaki Shahab (born 1946), Indonesian anthropologist
- Yasmine Kimiko Yamada (born 1997), Swiss figure skater
- Yasmine Yamajako, Finnish singer
- Yasmine Zouhir (born 2005), French-Moroccan footballer

=== Yassamine ===
- Yassamine Mather, Iranian scholar and political activist

=== Yassmin ===
- Yassmin Abdel-Magied, Australian activist
- Yassmin Alers, American stage actor
- Yassmin Gramian, American politician
- Yassmin Hamdy (born 1993), Egyptian karateka
- Yassmina Karajah, Jordanian-Canadian filmmaker and screenwriter

=== Yazmeen ===
- Yazmeen Jamieson (born 1998), Jamaican footballer
- Yazmeen Ryan (born 1999), American soccer player

== Middle name ==
- Bibi Yasmeen Shah, Pakistani politician
- Dilruba Yasmeen Ruhee (born 1988), Bangladeshi model and actress
- Larissa Yasmin Behrendt (born 1969), Australian writer and legal academic

== Surname ==
- Farida Yasmin (journalist) (born 1963), Bangladeshi journalist
- Farida Yasmin (singer) (1940–2015), Bangladeshi singer
- Ghazala Yasmeen (born 1948), Pakistani announcer
- Nilufar Yasmin (1948–2003), Bangladeshi singer
- Rizwana Yasmeen (born 1990), Pakistani field hockey player and captain
- Sabina Yasmin (born 1953), Bangladeshi singer
- Samina Yasmeen (born 1950), Pakistani professor
- Sharifa Yazmeen, Egyptian-American playwright
- Thomas Yassmin (born 1999), Australian American football player

== Fictional characters ==
- Yasmin, a Bratz doll
- Yasmine, a Muppet character in Sesame Street seen from Season 54 onwards
- Yasmeen the Kayaking Fairy, a character in the British children's book series Rainbow Magic
- Yasmin Green, a character in the British soap opera Family Affairs
- Yasmine Gauvin / Codename: France a superhero in the comic book series The Ambassadors and Big Game
- Yasmin "Yaz" Khan, a companion of the Thirteenth Doctor in the BBC series Doctor Who
- Yasmine Maalik, a character in the British soap opera Hollyoaks
- Yasamin Madrani, a main character in the animated web series gen:LOCK
- Yasmeen Nazir, a character in the British soap opera Coronation Street
- Yasmina Ait Omar, a recurring character in the Belgian series wtFOCK
