= Al-Tuwaijri =

al-Tuwaijri or Altwaijri (Arabic: التويجري) is a surname. Notable people with the surname include:

- Abdulaziz al-Tuwaijri (1912–2007), Saudi soldier
- Abdulhakeem Al-Tuwaijri (born 1979), Saudi football manager
- Khaled al-Tuwaijri (born 1960), Saudi politician
- Mohammad Al-Tuwaijri, Saudi politician
- Yasmin Altwaijri, Saudi epidemiologist
