= Azaiez =

Azaiez (Arabic: عزيز) is an Arabic surname. Notable people with the surname include:

- Khaled Azaiez (born 1976), Tunisian footballer
- Mehdi Azaiez (born 1974), French Quranic studies scholar
- Walid Azaïez (born 1976), Tunisian footballer
- Yasmine Azaiez (born 11988), British-born violinist
