= Loma Linda University School of Public Health, Department of Nutrition =

Coordinates: 34.0532°N 117.2601°W

The Loma Linda University School of Public Health, Department of Nutrition is one of six departments at the School of Public Health at Loma Linda University. While nutrition was always a part of the curriculum at the university, the department was initiated when the School of Public Health began in 1963.

== Nut Studies ==
The Department of Nutrition has produced studies on the health effects and nutritional properties of nuts. Department Chair Dr. Joan Sabaté discovered the link between nut consumption and protection from the risk of cardiovascular disease. The outcomes of his research were published in 1993 in The New England Journal of Medicine. In 2010, findings from a pooled analysis of 25 intervention trials with nuts, compiled by Sabaté, were published by the Archives of Internal Medicine. Both the new findings and the original research suggest that consumption of nuts may improve blood lipid levels and provide heart health protection. The department has conducted research on almonds, peanuts, pecans, walnuts, and nuts in general. The research includes both clinical intervention and epidemiological studies. Results from 19 separate inquiries are available at the department website regarding their nut studies.

== Vegetarian Research ==
The Department of Nutrition at Loma Linda University has studied the nutrition and health effects of plant foods and plant-based dietary patterns. The areas of investigation include assessing the safety, adequacy, and optimal potential of vegetarian eating patterns as well as assessing the potential impact of animal and plant foods on nutrition, microbial contamination, sanitary concerns, and the environment.

Loma Linda University have organized the International Congress on Vegetarian Nutrition since 1987. Notable attendees of the First International Congress on Vegetarian Nutrition held on March 16–18, 1987 include Phyllis B. Acosta, Johanna T. Dwyer, Jeanne H. Freeland-Graves, Alice Garrett Marsh, Ulma Doyle Register and Kathleen Keen Zolber.

The 5th congress, held March 4–6, 2008, was attended by over 700 research and health professionals from over 40 countries. Dr. Joan Sabaté has chaired the last two congresses and Nutrition Department faculty have served as chair of the scientific program. Proceedings from these congresses have been published in The American Journal of Clinical Nutrition and are available through the congress website.

Two vegetarian resources have been produced from department research. Dr. Joan Sabaté is editor of the book Vegetarian Nutrition. This book contains expert summaries of various aspects of a plant-based diet. It provides not only ethical, moral, and religious viewpoints from different periods of history but also modern perspectives on health promotion and disease prevention. The department has also produced a Vegetarian Food Pyramid, a four-page brochure that includes guidelines for healthy vegetarian diets, serving guides, and other recommended lifestyle habits.

== Academics ==
The Department of Nutrition provides programs leading to the Master of Public Health (MPH) and the Doctor of Public Health (DrPH) degrees. These two degrees include a field practicum component and prepare students to sit for the registration examination of the Commission on Dietetic Registration to become a registered dietitian. The department also offers the Master of Science (MS) degree in nutrition through the Faculty of Graduate Studies in the areas of nutritional science and clinical nutrition.
