= Hulda Crooks =

20th-century American mountaineer

- Born: May 19, 1896; Saskatchewan
- Died: November 23, 1997 (aged 101); Loma Linda, California
- Occupations: Mountaineer, dietitian

Hulda Hoehn Crooks (May 19, 1896 – November 23, 1997) was an American mountaineer, dietitian and vegetarianism activist. Affectionately known as "Grandma Whitney" she successfully scaled 14,505-foot (4,421 m) Mount Whitney 23 times between the ages of 65 and 91. She had climbed 97 other peaks during this period. In 1990, an Act of Congress renamed Day Needle, one of the peaks in the Whitney area, to Crooks Peak in her honor.

== Biography ==
Hulda Hoehn was born in Saskatchewan, Canada, one of 18 children of a farming couple. She left the farm just before she turned eighteen and enrolled at Pacific Union College north of San Francisco and later at Loma Linda University. There she met and married Dr Samuel Crooks. She took up climbing in 1950, after the death of her husband, who had encouraged her to start after she suffered a bout of pneumonia.

On July 24, 1987, at the age of 91, she became the oldest woman to complete the ascent of Mount Fuji in Japan. Crooks was sponsored by Dentsu and a photograph was taken of her at the top of the mountain.

She hiked the entire 212 mile John Muir Trail in the high Sierras, completing the hike in segments over five years.

Hulda Crooks was a long-time resident of Loma Linda, California, and a Seventh-day Adventist. She often spent time with children in the community, encouraging them to appreciate nature and stay active. In 1991 Loma Linda dedicated a park at the base of the south hills as Hulda Crooks Park.

Early to bed and early to rise. Out jogging about 5:30am. Jog a mile and walk it back briskly. It takes me 12 minutes to jog the mile and 15 minutes to walk it. Do some upper trunk exercises, work in the yard, and walk to the market, and work

— Hulda Crooks describing life at 80

According to Congressman Jerry Lewis (R California), one of her hiking companions,

No mountain was ever too high for this gentle giant. With a twinkle in her eye, and purpose in her step, 'Grandma Whitney' showed the world that mental, physical and spiritual health is attainable at any age.

Crooks died in 1997, aged 101.

== Vegetarianism ==
Crooks became a lacto-ovo vegetarian at age 18 which she adhered to for the rest of her life. Her interest in healthy eating resulted in her studying dietetics and graduating from Loma Linda University in 1927.

Crooks worked as a medical researcher for Mervyn Hardinge, Dean of the Loma Linda University School of Public Health. She conducted scientific research on vegetarian diets and during 1963–1964 authored several papers on vegetarianism with Hardinge for the Journal of the American Dietetic Association.

In 1988 and 1989, Loma Linda University sponsored the "Annual Hulda Crooks Gala" to benefit medical students and established the Hulda Crooks Scholarship.

== Selected publications ==
- Nutritional Studies of Vegetarians III (The American Journal of Clinical Nutrition, 1958)
- Nutritional Studies of Vegetarians IV (The American Journal of Clinical Nutrition, 1962)
- Non-Flesh Dietaries II (Journal of the American Dietetic Association, 1963)
- Is a Nonflesh Diet Adequate?. In The Great American Nutrition Hassle. Mayfield Publishing Company (with Mervyn G. Hardinge, 1978)
- Carbohydrates in Foods (Journal of the American Dietetic Association, 1965)
- Nutritionally Adequate Vegetarian Diets. In Handbook of Nutritional Supplements (with Ulma Doyle Register, 1983)
- Conquering Life's Mountains (The Quiet Hour, 1996)
