= Phyllis B. Acosta =

American public health researcher

- Born: Phyllis Jean Brown Acosta; December 27, 1933; Shoal Creek Township
- Died: September 30, 2018 (aged 84); Cleveland, Tennessee
- Occupation: Public health researcher

Phyllis B. Acosta (December 27, 1933 – September 30, 2018) was an American public health researcher best known for her research on inherited metabolic disorders and vegetarian diets. She was a pioneer in developing nutritional therapy for the management of phenylketonuria.

== Biography ==
Acosta was born in Shoal Creek Township, Cherokee County, North Carolina. She obtained a B.A. in 1955 from Andrews University and a Doctor of Public Health in 1969 from the University of Southern California. She worked with Richard Koch at the University of California, Los Angeles during 1966–1970 to establish the first guidelines for nutrition management of phenylketonuria. She also had a Master's in Dietetics degree.

She started the first nutrition clinic to treat patients with inherited metabolic disorders at Emory University. She was chair of the Department of Nutrition and Food Science at Florida State University and was Director of Metabolic Diseases at Abbott Nutrition from 1987 until her retirement in 2003. At Abbott Nutrition she developed medical foods for individuals with metabolic disorders. She was the principal author of the Ross Nutrition Support Protocol Handbook which is cited as a resource for clinicians managing metabolic disorders. In 2010, she authored Nutrition Management of Patients with Inherited Metabolic Disorders. She published over 150 peer-reviewed papers.

In 1967, Acosta received the first Lydia J. Roberts Fellowship in Public Health Nutrition. She was a member of the American Dietetic Association and was named an Outstanding Dietitian by the Association in 1991.

She had three children with her husband. She was a Seventh-day Adventist until her later years and was then described as "of the Christian faith". She died in Cleveland, Tennessee, aged 84. The Genetic Metabolic Dietitians International established the Phyllis Acosta Scholarship Fund in her honor.

== Vegetarianism ==
Acosta was a lacto-ovo vegetarian. She co-authored Diet Manual: Utilizing a Vegetarian Diet Plan in 1965 for the Seventh-Day Adventist Dietetic Association. In 1987, she attended Loma Linda University's First International Congress on Vegetarian Nutrition.

She studied vegan and vegetarian diets with Alice Garrett Marsh of Andrews University and at Loma Linda University. She was a reviewer for the 1988 and 1993 American Dietetic Association position papers on vegetarian diets.

== Selected publications ==
- Diet Manual: Utilizing a Vegetarian Diet Plan (with Ardis Beckner, 1965)
- The Phenylalanine-Restricted Diet Recipe Book (with Ardis Beckner, 1966)
- Diet Management of PKU for Infants and Preschool Children (with Elizabeth Wenz, 1978)
- Nutrients in Vegetarian Foods (1984)
- Feeding the Vegan Infant and Child (1985)
- Availability of Essential Amino Acids and Nitrogen in Vegan Diets (1988)
- Nutrition Support Protocols: The Ross Metabolic Formula System (1997)
- Nutrient Management of Patients with Inherited Metabolic Disorders (2010)
