= La Wela =

"La Wela لا ويلاه"

Single by Yasmine Nayar
- Released: 2017
- Recorded: 2017
- Genre: Arabic pop
- Length: 4:37
- Label: Yasmine Nayar
- Producer(s): Yasmine Nayar

Yasmine Nayar singles chronology
"Eysh Eysh" (2016)	"La Wela لا ويلاه" (2017)	"Enchanté" (2016)

"La Wela" "('No and never') is a song recorded by the Algerian singer Yasmine Nayar in 2017 and released as a single in 2017. The song was a considerable success in its native Algeria and also managed to reach on the number one spot on a number of countries like Egypt, Syria, Jordan and Lebanon.
