= Constituency WR-08 =

Reserved seat in a Pakistani provincial assembly

- Constituency for the Khyber Pakhtunkhwa Assembly

Current constituency
- Member: Nagina Khan

Constituency WR-08 is a reserved seat for women in the Khyber Pakhtunkhwa Assembly.

== 2013 ==
- Nagina Khan

== See also ==
- Constituency PK-80 (Swat-I)
- Constituency PK-81 (Swat-II)
- Constituency PK-82 (Swat-III)
- Constituency PK-83 (Swat-IV)
- Constituency PK-84 (Swat-V)
- Constituency PK-85 (Swat-VI)
- Constituency PK-86 (Swat-VII)
- Constituency WR-20
