= Punishment narratives in the Quran =

Literary form in the Quran

Punishment narratives or narrative of divine retribution or pericope of retribution are a literary form present in the Qur'an of narratives recounting the destruction of a people in the past in response to a refusal to listen to a divine messenger .

== Historiography ==
The term was first used by Josef Horovitz in Koranische Untersuchungen in 1926.

== Literary scheme ==
This literary topos follows a usual pattern composed of a meeting between a messenger of God and a community. The messenger exhorts to repentance and the worship of God, while the community refuses the divine message and rejects the messenger, and in turn gets destroyed by God. In this scheme, it is a past destruction and not a promise for life after death. The messenger is saved, sometimes with some characters who followed him.

Many passages of the Quran follow this pattern. These stories are thus constructed to evoke the history of Noah, Lot, the Arab prophets, and some others anonymous groups. These passages mainly belong to the Meccan period. The oldest is found in Surah 91 and concerns the Thamud. This passage evokes the existence of a local legend telling of a sacrilege. If this people is evoked in pre-Islamic poetry, these evocations are mixed with later traditions. Jonah is the only case in the entire Quran where the community repents and escapes punishment.

== Interpretations ==
This type of story is intended to highlight divine power and prove the origin of what the messengers transmit.

The study of the different versions of theses stories can also allow, by highlighting the common points and the differences, to shed light on the process of composition of these passages. Thus, verses 59-157 of surah 7 show the knowledge of the other stories of Quranic punishment and are therefore more recent. Thus, in the Quran, different stories of punishment are similar, but it has also been noted that several versions of the same story, depending on the surahs, allegedly show "phenomena of rewriting".

The message of the messenger is always that of a strict monotheism and an eschatological expectation. It thus always reflects that of the life of Mohammad, which allowed the creation of the concept of "monoprophetism". "These references to past events in the Qur'an are, of course, meant to serve the role of warning and therefore have a didactic and morally edifying effect on the audience of the Qur'an.". Furthermore, these stories served as an encouragement for Muhammad and his companions to resist the unbelievers. This could explain the paradigm shift after the Hijrah and the loss of importance of these stories following Muhammad's rise to power.

In these stories, the messengers come from the people they meet and are rejected by them. This is in line with the prophetic narratives of the Old or New Testaments.

== See also ==
- Quranic counter-discourse
