= Vegetarian Diet Pyramid =

Nutrition guide for a healthy vegetarian diet

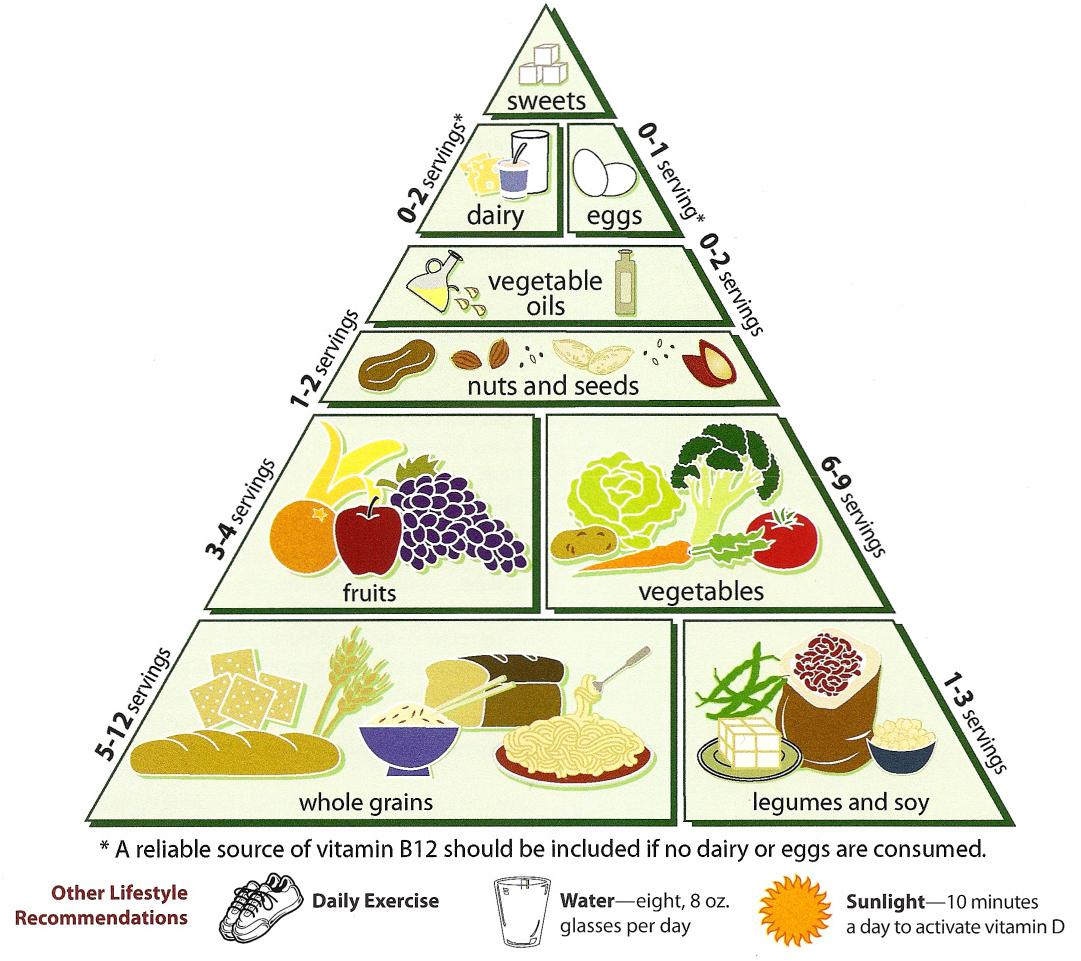
Loma Linda University Vegetarian Food Pyramid

This vegan food pyramid is based on suggestions from the American Dietetic Association.

Vegetarian Diet Pyramid is a nutrition guide that represents a traditional healthy vegetarian diet. Variations of this traditional healthy vegetarian diet exist throughout the world, particularly in parts of North America, Europe, South America and, most notably, Asia. Given these carefully defined parameters, the phrase "Traditional Vegetarian Diet" is used here to represent the healthy traditional ovo-lacto vegetarian diets of these regions and peoples. A pyramid was created by Oldways Preservation Trust in 1998 with scientific research from Cornell and Harvard University and specific reference to the healthy patterns of eating demonstrated by the Mediterranean Diet Pyramid.

This Vegetarian Diet Pyramid suggests the types and frequencies of foods that should be enjoyed for health. The pyramid is divided into daily, weekly, and monthly frequencies, but does not recommend serving sizes. The pyramid also has recommendations for daily physical activity and hydration.

Loma Linda University School of Public Health, Department of Nutrition developed The Vegetarian Food Pyramid in 1997 for presentation at the 3rd International Congress on Vegetarian Nutrition. The five major plant-based food groups (whole grains, legumes, vegetables, fruits, nuts and seeds) form the trapezoid-shaped lower portion of the pyramid. Optional food groups (vegetable oils, dairy, and sweets) form the triangle-shaped top portion of the pyramid. This version of the pyramid includes a table with recommended number of daily servings per daily calorie intake.

According to the 2010 Dietary Guidelines for Americans, healthful diets contain the amounts of essential nutrients and energy needed to prevent nutritional deficiencies and excesses. Healthful diets also provide the right balance of carbohydrates, fat, and protein to reduce risks for chronic diseases, and they are obtained from a variety of foods that are available, affordable, and enjoyable.

Meat contains complete proteins, but vegetarian protein sources are incomplete proteins and therefore a variety of protein rich foods must be consumed to create a complete protein profile. This method of combining a balance of incomplete vegetarian proteins to create a complete protein profile is known as complementary protein building. In recent decades, many vegetable proteins are recognized as having all nine essential amino acids, being complete proteins, leading the American Heart Association to suggest many people eat too much meat and dairy, recommending a long list of plant proteins.

The healthfulness of this pattern has been corroborated by epidemiological and experimental nutrition.

== See also ==
- Diet in Hinduism
