= SuperMama =

Parenting website

SuperMama is an Arabic parenting portal directed to mothers in the Middle East. It provides different types of written and visual localized content to mothers in the region, from getting pregnant, raising kids, managing home, and taking care of her health and beauty. The website has been online since October 2011. Supermama was included in the Forbes list of the most visited websites in the Middle East for 2021.

== History ==
SuperMama was established in October 2011 by entrepreneurs Yasmine El-Mehairy and Zeinab Samir as a source of information for mothers and mothers-to-be in Egypt and in MENA. The company is based in Cairo, Egypt.

== Awards ==
Year	Session	Outcome
2010	MIT Enterprise Forum Arabia Business Plan competition	Semifinalist
2011	NexGen Competition, a joint initiative between ITIDA, the USAID entrepreneurship program and the Danish foreign ministry	Winner
2011	eNNOVATION competition in Poland	Winner of both the judges award of 10,000 euros and the audience award
2011	Startup Demo at ArabNet in Cairo	Winner
2012	Google Ebda2 Competition in Cairo	Finalist
