= Self-referential discourse of the Quran =

Rhetorical device in the Qur'an

The self-referential discourse of the Quran is the set of rhetorical forms in which the Qur'an cites itself to varying degrees in a self-referential manner. These argumentative strategies aim to ensure its authority and support its divine origin.

== Historiography ==
Several researchers, such as A. Johns, T. Nagel, and A.-L. de Prémare, have already studied this dimension of self-reference of the Quran but without real exhaustiveness. In 2010, a thesis was defended, under the direction of Denis Gril, by Anne-Sylvie Boisliveau on the subject and partially published in 2014. It seeks to question the way in which the Quran self-designates itself and the purpose of these self-references.

== Quranic Terminology ==
=== Self-referential terminology ===
The Quran uses several terms to designate itself either as a work or for a part of itself. These are the words kitab, qurʾān, ḏhikr, āyāt, sūra and so on. The terminology used by the Quran often shows a "readaptation [...] of Jewish or Christian religious technical terms sometimes having a new meaning that is difficult to detect due to the fact that the Quran seeks to bring them a dimension of mystery and this in order to place itself de facto in the lineage of the previous holy Scriptures and to confer on itself a status of authority".

For example, of all the terms by which the Qur'an refers to itself, the term aya is one of the most complex to study, "because it is often used to refer to something other than a part of the text."

The term aya and its plural form appear 381 times in the Qur'an. In the Qur'anic text, it can refer to a section of the text, and when it does, "it is not in the common sense of 'verse' that the word has subsequently taken on in Islamic culture—except perhaps in one or two cases whose meaning is uncertain." Thus, the traditional understanding of this term, as with the term Sura', does not necessarily agree with its Qur'anic meaning.

=== Revelation, descent ===
Several terms are used to designate the divine origin of the Quran. Thus, if the term "revelation" seems, for Boisliveau, improper, the Quran uses a vocabulary to designate the action of descending, which allows it to impose its authority. Other Quranic terms express the idea that it emanates "unilaterally from God for the benefit of men, and at the same time as a clear and accessible word". This description allows the creation of a binary representation of the Quran and the construction of a "very positive" image of it.

== Self-reference as an argumentative strategy ==
These self-references are part of the argumentative strategies desired by the author or authors of the Qur'an to get its message across.

The first strategy is the insertion of the Qur'an into the discourse on natural phenomena, on eschatology and on divine omnipotence. This allows a parallel to be created with the Qur'anic text and to assimilate "from then on the "descent" of the Qur'an to a benefit". It is in this context that the discourses on the prophets of the past are inscribed, which are all presented according to the same pattern, and serve to defend the obligation to believe in the prophets.

The second strategy concerns the Holy Scriptures and joins the question of the self-referential vocabulary of the Quran which designates itself by specific terms which place it in the continuity of these. However, the Quran presents them "according to a conception which is proper to it", denying the concepts of Holy Scriptures as they are experienced in Judaism or in Christianity. "This discourse, which paradoxically declares these Writings to be true at the same time as it disqualifies them, allows the Quran both to show its belonging to the genre of the previous sacred Scriptures and to proclaim its superiority and thus affirm its monopoly of scriptural authority".

Finally, the last strategy concerns the prophetic figure. It includes accusations, from real or non-real adversaries, made against Muhammad. These accusations are refuted by the negation or accusation of the adversaries. These counter-discourses allow the latter to define himself, often in the negative. Muhammad is presented according to a classic prophetic type and parallels can be found with Noah or Moses.

These strategies use different rhetorical elements, such as tautology, asides, oaths... "These elements are combined in order to forcefully persuade the listener or reader of the Quran to submit to it completely". This allows the Quran to self-canonize itself by conferring on itself a higher status of authority.

== Diachronic approach ==
According to studies on the self-reference of the Quran, "this image that the Quran offers of itself can sometimes appear blurred or contradictory". This may be linked to the fact that these are mainly synchronic and have not always taken into account the diachronic and chronological development of the text. AS Boisliveau therefore conducted a diachronic study of the 33 surahs of the Quran considered to be the oldest. Nevertheless, for Terrier, the basic hypothesis of the absence of later modifications of the text and the use of the chronological orders of Al-Azhar and Nöldeke shows that this study still maintains "an ambivalent relationship with the Muslim tradition, being often less critical and more dependent on it than they want to say.

She noted the presence of two types of text, the divine order to recite a liturgical prayer and those to "recall aloud the actions of God". This ancient period shows that most of the characteristics of Quranic self-reference are absent. "It is indeed not a question here of a corpus encompassing all the words within fixed limits, nor of a sacred Scripture that God would have sent down to a true prophet."

The author distinguishes in the text itself the "text α", corresponding to the content of the reminder and the "text β" corresponding to the staging of this text and in a parallel manner for the prayers α' and β'. Boisliveau notes that the stagings are absent from the oldest texts showing an evolution towards the idea of divine dictation. Moreover, initially, only the text α and the injunctions of β were considered divine. This finds a parallel with the research of Sinai which showed that the idea of the celestial kitab is absent at the beginning of the Koran and appears progressively.

== See also ==
- Quranic counter-discourse
