= Quranic counter-discourse =

Rhetorical technique used in the Quran

Quranic counter-discourse, also known as Counter Direct Reported Discourse (CDRD) or "polemical rhetoric," is a rhetorical technique used in the Quran. It involves quoting or referencing the views of various opponents to argue for a different perspective or to counter those opposing viewpoints.

== Historiography ==
Several medieval authors have studied Qur'anic polemics, in particular al-Gazali, al-Ṭūfī and al Suyūṭī. Polemical forms in the Qur'an have also been studied by Angelica Neuwirth and Neal Robinson. Among these, this form of counter-discourse was identified as typically Qur'anic by Josef Van Ess in 1970. It was studied by Rosalind Gwynne Ward in 2004, then by Mehdi Azaiez as part of his thesis under the supervision of Claude Gilliot.

These polemical strategies demonstrate the capacity of the Quranic text to mobilize linguistic and rhetorical resources to convince its audience. These elements have, in particular, been studied linguistically. Conversely, the Muslim tradition has developed numerous exegetical and hagiographical narratives around them, which a critical analysis from the orientalist school views with suspicion. This apologetic approach remains prevalent in Arab universities.

== Literary scheme ==
This rhetorical form successively presents a discourse, called "counter-discourse", and the response made to it. It can be in the form yaqūlūna ... fa-qul (they say... tell them). Creating an antagonism of discourse, this schema "is part of an argumentative question with a view to seeking the assent of a person that one aims to convince in the context of a discursive conflict".

This rhetorical form is present in 588 verses of the Quran and 37 surahs do not have any. For Azaiez, the importance of these polemics increases as the Quranic chronology progresses, "as if the increase in this counter-discourse was the sign of a growing opposition to the Quran itself". This is one of the most important genres of the Quran.

Alfred-Louis de Prémare identified five major themes in Quranic polemics: "the messenger is only a poet or a soothsayer possessed by his demon, the second declares that the messenger only transmits texts through the Ancients, the third refutes doctrinal themes such as individual resurrection, judgment and punishment, the fourth argues for the manipulation of the texts of Scripture, the fifth, finally, underlines the fragmented and non-unified character of the text." Nevertheless, the answers are similar and are generally based on an argument from authority or ad hominem.

The Quranic passages using this rhetorical form can be divided into three groups, which evoke the past time; the present time of Muhammad and the eschatological time. They represent respectively 37.5, 46 and 16.5%.

== Approach to the context of the emergence of the Quran ==
From a historical point of view, the controversies brought about by this type of discourse have been studied by Chabbi and Prémare. These authors mainly see them as an image of the origins of Islam. The study of these counter-discourses allows, beyond the rhetorical aspect, to study the doctrinal oppositions at the time of the birth of Islam and the establishment of the boundaries of this new religion. This allows us to better understand the context of the emergence of the Qur'an. Thus, the presence of counter-discourses on the absence of divine procreation but none on polytheism supports the thesis of a predominantly monotheistic Arabia at that time.

Azaiez sees in intertextual studies a future extension for the study of this rhetorical form. It would allow to confront these counter-discourses with texts from late Antiquity and to seek concomitances to better understand its environment and its contacts. This rhetorical form is already present in the Bible. Placing it in a historical perspective, Prémare saw the Koran as the "fruit of a process of writing marked by the ideological, theological and political conflicts of a nascent Islam".

The study of these counter-discourses is supposed to shed light on the Qur'ans discursive developments. For example, in the eschatological counter-discourses, the Quran first proclaims a non-biblical belief before soliciting these as arguments.

== The construction of the opponent ==
The presence of counter-discourses in a text that is intended to be transcendent may seem paradoxical. "This paradox would therefore in reality be an effective strategy to refute the opponent's words."

These counter-discourses create a constructed image of the opponent, "drowned [...] in anonymity" and who can only be described by what the Quran presents. This aspect raises the question of this counter-discourse, between "faithful quotation or polemical artifice". For Pierre Larcher, "the Quranic discourse being frequently polemical, we hear the voice of the other, whether it is a historical adversary or an adversary constructed for the needs of the cause. The reported speech and the indistinctness of the opponent created a distance with the speaker. For Azaiez, "thus, to the question of the historian who wonders about the identity of the opponents of the Quran, we are inclined to believe that they are first and foremost the opponents of the Quran as the latter constructs and represents them".

== See also ==
- Self-referential discourse of the Quran
- Punishment narratives in the Quran
