= Frank Lewis Marsh =

American biologist and educator (1899–1992)

- Born: October 18, 1899; Aledo, Illinois
- Died: July 14, 1992 (aged 92)
- Education: Emmanuel Missionary College; University of Chicago; Northwestern University (MS); University of Nebraska (PhD)
- Known for: Educator and young Earth creationist
- Scientific career
- Fields: Biology
- Academic advisors: George McCready Price

Frank Lewis Marsh (18 October 1899, Aledo, Illinois – 14 July 1992) was an American Seventh-Day Adventist biologist, educator and young Earth creationist. In 1963 he was one of the ten founding members of the Creation Research Society.

== Biography ==
In his youth, Marsh desired to become a physician, but lacked the financial means, so he became first a nurse, then a teacher instead. He studied geology at Emmanuel Missionary College under George McCready Price, whose protégé he became. While teaching at a Seventh-day Adventist school in the Chicago area, Marsh studied advanced biology at the University of Chicago and in 1935 obtained an M.S. in zoology from Northwestern University. He joined the faculty of Union College in Lincoln, Nebraska, later completing a PhD in botany on plant ecology at the University of Nebraska in 1940.

Marsh was married to dietitian Alice Garrett Marsh. They had two children, Kendall and Sylvia.

In his book Fundamental Biology, Marsh described himself as a "fundamentalist scientist". He argued that modern human races are degenerate forms of first-created man and warned that the living world is the scene of a cosmic struggle between the Creator and Satan. Marsh claimed that Satan is a "master geneticist" and speculated that amalgamation and hybridization are his ways of destroying the original harmony and perfection among living things. Marsh viewed dark skin color as one of the "abnormalities" engineered in this way.

In Fundamental Biology, Marsh coined the term baramin for the Genesis "kind". In Evolution or Special Creation? (1947), Marsh argued for the scientific accuracy of the Bible and concluded: "surely the time is ripe for a return to the fundamentals of true science, the science of creationism". From the publication of this work onward, Marsh avoided mentioning Ellen G. White, co-founder of Seventh-day Adventism, as he believed such references would repel non-Adventist readers.

Marsh commented that "The Bible knows nothing about organic evolution. It regards the origin of man by special creation as a historical fact... In view of the subjectivity of the evidence upon which a decision on the matter of origins must be made, creationism and evolutionism should be respected as alternate viewpoints".

His creationist views have been criticized by biologists for having no scientific basis. For instance, Theodosius Dobzhansky said that Marsh assumes that all dogs, foxes, and hyenas are members of a single kind descending from a common ancestor in less than 6000 years, a speed of evolution far faster than any evolutionary biologist could conceive.

== Publications ==
- (1941) Fundamental Biology
- (1944) Evolution, Creation and Science
- (1947) Evolution or Special Creation?
- (c. 1950) Studies in Creationism
- (c. 1957) Life, Man and Time
- (1976) Variation and Fixity in Nature
- (1978) Prairie Tree Early Days on the Northern Illinois Prairie

== See also ==
- Creation biology
- Creation–evolution controversy
- Young Earth creationism
- Seventh-day Adventist Church
