= Pediatric Neurology (journal) =

- Discipline: Neurology, pediatrics
- Language: English
- Edited by: Yasmin Khakoo

Publication details
- History: 1985–present
- Publisher: Elsevier
- Frequency: Monthly
- Open access: Hybrid
- Impact factor: 3.2 (2023)

Standard abbreviations
- ISO 4: Pediatr. Neurol.

Indexing
- ISSN: 0887-8994 (print); 1873-5150 (web)
- OCLC no.: 642971339

Links
- Journal homepage; Online access; Online archive

Pediatric Neurology is a monthly peer-reviewed medical journal that covers neurological disorders of children and adolescents. It was established in 1985 and is published by Elsevier. The journal contains research articles, topical reviews, short clinical reports, and short commentaries. The editor-in-chief is Yasmin Khakoo (Memorial Sloan Kettering Cancer Center and Weill Cornell Medical School). Previous editors included Ken Swaiman (from 1985–2012) and E. Steve Roach (2012–2021).

== Abstracting and indexing ==
The journal is abstracted and indexed in:

- CAB Abstracts
- CINAHL
- Current Contents/Clinical Medicine
- Current Contents/Life Sciences
- EBSCO databases
- Embase
- Index Medicus/MEDLINE/PubMed
- Science Citation Index Expanded
- Scopus

According to the Journal Citation Reports, the journal has a 2023 impact factor of 3.2.
