= Bechwech =

"Bechwech بشويش"

Single by Yasmine Nayar
- Released: 2016
- Recorded: 2016
- Genre: Arabic pop
- Length: 4:02
- Label: Yasmine Nayar
- Producer(s): Yasmine Nayar

Yasmine Nayar singles chronology
| "Eysh Eysh" (2016) | "Bechwech بشويش" (2016) | "Enchanté" (2016) |

"Bechwech" "('slowly') is a song recorded by the Algerian singer Yasmine Nayar in 2016 and released as a single in 2016. The song was a considerable success in its native Algeria and also managed to reach on the number one spot on a number of countries like Egypt, Syria, Jordan and Lebanon.
