= Yasmin Altwaijri =

Epidemiologist

- Education: King Saud University, Tufts University
- Scientific career
- Fields: Epidemiology
- Workplaces: King Faisal Specialist Hospital and Research Centre
- Doctoral advisor: Johanna Dwyer

Yasmin Ahmed Almubarak Altwaijri (Arabic: ياسمين أحمد المبارك التويجري) is a Senior Scientist and the Head of Epidemiology Research at King Faisal Specialist Hospital and Research Centre (KFSH&RC) in Riyadh, Saudi Arabia. As the Head of Epidemiology Research, she studies the causes and effects of diseases and illnesses within a specific country, in her case Saudi Arabia. She studies the prevalence of conditions such as obesity and mental illness in Saudi society, and is active in advocating for social and political changes to promote better health.

== Education ==
Altwaijri studied Community Health at King Saud University in Riyadh, receiving her B.Sc. in 1992. After marrying, she and her husband moved to the United States to attend graduate school. Altwaijri studied with Johanna Dwyer, director of the Frances Stern Nutrition Center at Tufts University's Friedman School of Nutrition Science and Policy. She received her M.Sc. from Tufts University in 1996 and her Ph.D. in 2002. Her parents strongly encouraged her to have a professional career that would enable her to be financially independent.

== Career ==
After returning to Saudi Arabia from Boston in 2002, Altwaijri joined King Saud bin Abdulaziz University for Health Sciences. Next she joined King Faisal Specialist Hospital and Research Centre in Riyadh where she leads the epidemiology research center. She is considered one of the top senior scientists in the country.

Altwaijri is involved in designing and carrying out epidemiological studies of the Saudi population, with particular attention to women, children and adolescents.

One area of concern is the lack of pubertal growth standards for Saudi children. The only standards available to Saudi pediatricians have been based on pubertal characteristics of children in the United States. Altwaijri is developing epidemiological studies of Saudi children that will be sensitive to factors in Saudi life such as socioeconomic standards, diet, and geography.

She also researches risk factors such as obesity, smoking, hypertension, high blood cholesterol and lack of exercise, which affect chronic diseases. She emphasizes the importance of social determinants of health and strongly advocates for social and political changes that would promote more healthy lifestyles. She is particularly concerned about women, who are at a higher risk of developing obesity than Saudi men, in part because socio-cultural factors restrict opportunities for women to exercise and discourage women's participation in sports. Altwaijri advocates for the inclusion of a physical curriculum for girls as well as boys in schools; creation of safe neighborhood play spaces for both male and female children; safe areas where adult men and women can be physically active; and affordable health clubs for both women and men. She also supports regulation of food prices to promote the choice of healthy over unhealthy foods. To keep her children active, she enrolled them in competitive team swimming, where they became eligible to attend the AAU Junior Olympic Games.

Altwaijri is a Principal Investigator for the Saudi National Mental Health Survey, a broad-based investigation assessing the impact of mental illness in Saudi communities. No research into this area had been done previously in Saudi Arabia, even though the World Health Organization (WHO) reports that five of the ten most burdensome diseases in the world involve mental health. In addition to Saudi government and educational institutions, this research involves international collaboration with Harvard University, the University of Michigan, and the World Health Organization. The study, which was initiated in 2009, had the goal of visiting the homes of 5,000 men and women to interview people from across the country. 86% of interviewees were willing to participate.

=== Obesity in Saudi Arabia ===
Obesity, and specifically childhood obesity, is on the rise around the world. This trend is mostly seen in developed countries, but it is also seen in developing countries, including the Middle East, Central and Eastern Europe. Saudi Arabia has seen an increase in childhood obesity and one in every six children in Saudi Arabia is obese. These trends correlate to lack of exercise, problems with focusing at school, and a decrease in playing with other children. Among the adult population, there is a prevalence of 42.4% obesity in males and 31.8% obesity in females. This rise in obesity puts a major strain on the healthcare system in Saudi Arabia as it is a risk factor for more serious diseases, such as cardiovascular disease. It can be attributed to the recent strengthening of the economy in Saudi Arabia. The accelerating economy was accompanied by a more "westernized" diet with more nutritional concerns.

== Women in science ==
Altwaijri chairs the Saudi Women in Science Committee, a national network of female scientists from Saudi Arabia. She encourages Saudi women to enter scientific and technological fields, arguing that women scientists can use electronic forms of communication to collaborate and do significant work without "cross[ing] the boundaries of our societal norms and customs." She indicates that restrictions such as the ban on women drivers make it difficult for women to go to work or to visit a fitness center.

Altwaijri is one of thirty-five women featured in the book Arab Women Rising, which includes women from Tunisia to Saudi Arabia. She was included in the BBC's 2014 list featuring 100 Women internationally.
