= Abdulaziz al-Tuwaijri =

Saudi politician

- Succeeded by: Khaled al-Tuwaijri

Personal details
- Born: 1912
- Died: 2007 (aged 94–95)
- Occupation: Soldier, Politician
- Known for: Deputy Head of the National Guard, Chief of the Crown Prince's Court

Abdulaziz bin Abd al-Muhsin al-Tuwaijri (1912–2007), was a Saudi soldier and politician. He was deputy head of the National Guard under his friend and mentor Prince Abdullah bin Abdulaziz and was later chief of the Crown Prince's Court when the Prince was Heir Apparent and later Regent. He was succeeded by his son Khaled, who himself became de facto prime minister of Saudi Arabia.

== Career ==
Abdulaziz al-Tuwaijri was one of the editors of Al Qassim, a weekly nationalist paper, which had been launched by Abdullah Al Ali Al Sani in December 1959. Al-Tuwaijri first met Prince Abdullah in the 1960s, when the latter was made head of the National Guard. At the time, the Guard was an extremely small and disorganized force and the position was meant as a sop while King Saud and Crown Prince Feisal were locked in a deadly power struggle. Al-Tuwaijri advised the Prince to turn what might be a dead-end nominal position into a real opportunity to get real power.

Intrigued, Prince Abdullah brought Al-Tuwaijri on board as his deputy, and over the years the two created a modern and sophisticated force. They not only developed its military capabilities, but also ensured its members were provided with top-class housing, medical care and education. This transformed the National Guard into an independent empire loyal to Abdullah. To many the success of the National Guard was due to the hard work and foresight of al-Tuwaijri, who became Prince Abdullah's close confidant and special advisor.

While known to be completely loyal to the Saudi absolute monarchy, al-Tuwaijri was also known to have Ba'athist sympathies. He was friends with Egyptian President Gamal Abdel Nasser. During Saudi–Egyptian tensions over competing regional interests, al-Tuwaijri demonstrated his excellent political skills by acting as a go-between of Nasser and King Faisal and publicly supporting both sides. Al-Tuwaijri shied away from the media spotlight. Some joked that he did not exist because while they had heard of his influence they had never actually seen him.

Following the murder of King Faisal in 1975, Prince Abdullah was appointed second deputy prime minister, and al-Tuwaijri continued as his top aide and advisor, and when Abdullah became Crown Prince, he became chief of the Crown Prince Court. Abdullah kept him at his side when he became regent in the mid-1990s. He became the most powerful non-royal citizen in the country until he retired in 2005.
