= Yasmine Mustafa =

American entrepreneur

- ياسمين مصطفى
- Education: Bachelor of Business Administration (BBA)
- Alma mater: Temple University
- Occupations: Entrepreneur; CEO of ROAR for Good
- Organization(s): ROAR for Good; Girl Develop It (GDI); 123LinkIt
- Website: https://www.yasminemustafa.com/

Yasmine Mustafa (Arabic: ياسمين مصطفى; born 1982) is an American CEO, entrepreneur and activist in technology for women. She is based in Philadelphia.

== Early life ==
Mustafa was born in Kuwait, and lived there until she was eight years old. She was eight years old when the Gulf War began and was forced to evacuate with her family and move to America. After arriving in America, her younger brother was born. The family settled in Philadelphia, where Mustafa learned English and spent the rest of her childhood.

Her first job was working in a 7-Eleven store owned by her father.

She got into tech when she was 24 and interned at a tech consultancy firm while in the entrepreneurship program at Temple University in Philadelphia. She worked her way up at the firm and was offered a job by the company owner, Skip Shuda, after she graduated from college. While working at this tech company, she got the idea for her first company, 123LinkIt. Mustafa attended Temple University part-time, financing her own education and graduating summa cum laude in 2006.

== Professional life ==
Mustafa has started several companies including;

123LinkIt

In 2009, she started 123LinkIt, a company created to help writers make money off of their blogs. She was the CEO of the company until she sold it in 2011.

Girl Develop It (Philadelphia)

Mustafa also founded the Philadelphia chapter of Girl Develop It, a nonprofit organization that teaches web and software development to women. She learned about GDI from Twitter and signed up and completed one of their courses. After finishing her course, she approached the instructor (GDI's founder) and talked to her about expansion; she brought GDI to Philadelphia six months later.

ROAR for Good

Mustafa is the CEO and co-founder of ROAR (formerly ROAR for Good), which launched in 2015. Mustafa came up with the idea of ROAR when she was 30 years old and traveling in Spanish countries for six months. While traveling, she was told horror stories about women who had been sexually assaulted or harassed, and when she returned from her trip, she found out her neighbor had been severely beaten and raped. These stories made her realize the prevalence of violence against women, and she wanted to do something about it.

After spending some time research the issue, she and her team realized a technological solution was need that could help someone during an attack, but not be used against them. They came up with the idea for “Athena,” a stylish panic button designed to deter attackers with an audible alert message and notify pre-selected contacts of the wearer's location when pressed.

Since that time, ROAR's products and technologies have evolved, and today the company offers wearable panic buttons, direct-to-911 panic buttons, and underdesk panic buttons solutions. The company's evolution is a direct result of Yasmine's belief that no one should be afraid while trying to earn a wage.

== Other activities ==
In 2024, she sits on the board of Coded by Kids.

She also publishes a podcast focussing on business and media.

== Commendations ==
In 2016, Mustafa was recognized in BBC's annual 100 Women series, which recognizes significant achievements of women around the world.
