= Khaled al-Tuwaijri =

Former chief of the Saudi royal court (born 1960)

Khalid al-Tuwaijri
- Born: 1960 (age 65–66)
- Citizenship: Saudi Arabia
- Education: Law, Master's degree in Political Science, Master's degree in Islamic Criminal Law
- Occupation: Former chief of the Royal Court of King Abdullah of Saudi Arabia
- Known for: Being the highest ranking non-prince in the kingdom until his ousting by King Salman in 2015

Khalid al-Tuwaijri is a former chief of the Royal Court of King Abdullah of Saudi Arabia who was the highest ranking non-prince in the kingdom until his sacking in 2015 by King Salman.

As chief of the royal court, al-Tuwaijri became the most powerful official in the Saudi Royal Family as the King's gatekeeper and confidant, where he would be the first and last to see the king during decision-making meetings, and would control who and what information would be presented before the King.

== Biography ==
Al-Tuwaijri was born in 1960, and studied law in Saudi Arabia. He obtained a Master's degree in political science in the United States, and another in Islamic criminal law, on returning to Saudi Arabia. He is an author and poet.

He commissioned into the Saudi Arabian civil service in 1995, aged 35, and rotated across several positions until he became chief of the Crown Prince's Court, replacing his father Abdulaziz al-Tuwaijri, a decade later in early 2005. On his ascension, King Abdullah appointed him on 9 October 2005 as chief of the Royal Court, replacing another commoner, Mohammed bin Abdullah Al Nuweisir. In 2007, the King appointed him secretary-general of the Allegiance Council. In 2011, al-Tuwaijri cemented his power by replacing Prince Abdul Aziz bin Fahd as chief of the Cabinet Court, which would be merged with the Royal Court. This resulted in bringing all government business under his purview. As the secretary general, he had a say in the staffing of all the monarchy's senior positions.

Al-Tuwaijri also became chief of the Royal Guard, and as a signal mark of the King's trust and favour was given other court positions. As chief of the Royal Guard, al-Tuwaijri would be in charge of personal security of the King as well as the royal court at large.

By the time of King Abdullah's death, al-Tuwaijri had become unpopular with some senior princes, who described him as an "octopus," "the head of corruption", "the black box" and the "patron of the secularists" due to his huge influence and power on directing the royal court, and by extension the Kingdom's affairs. It was reported that Prince Mishaal, the then eldest surviving son of King Abdulaziz, used to refer to al-Tuwaijri as King Khalid because of his immense influence in the Royal Court in Riyadh.

Al-Tuwaijri was also denounced as the prime leader of the "Westernization project" in Saudi Arabia, and was accused of trying to "shield" the king by preventing most of the Royal Family members from meeting him in his role as gatekeeper to the King.

Several media sources reported the disappearance of al-Tuwaijri as soon as King Abdullah died, and many believed his removal was in effect a defeat of the liberal faction led by the late King and his most favoured son Miteb, Minister of the National Guard and a candidate for deputy crown prince.

== Arrest ==
On 4 November 2017, Khaled al-Tuwaijri was arrested in Saudi Arabia in a "corruption crackdown" conducted by a purported anti-corruption committee. Along with several senior princes, Khaled al-Tuwaijri was freed in January 2018.
