= Yasmina Benslimane =

Moroccan feminist and activist

- ياسمينا بن سليمان
- Born: Rabat, Morocco
- Education: University for Peace
- Occupation: Activist
- Website: yasminabenslimane.org

Yasmina Benslimane (Arabic: ياسمينا بن سليمان) is a Moroccan feminist activist and the founder of Politics4Her. She is known for her work advocating for gender equality, women's rights, and increased political participation and representation, particularly for young women and girls.

In 2023, Benslimane appeared on the Forbes 30 Under 30 list for Puerto Rico. Her work gained international attention, leading to her inclusion in the 100 Women (BBC) in the category of politics and advocacy.

== Career and activism ==
In 2017, Benslimane founded Politics4Her which focuses on key societal challenges, including climate justice, forced migration, gender-based violence, and peace-building. Her work, recognized internationally, has brought attention to these issues on platforms such as HuffPost and Al Jazeera.

Benslimane has spoken at several institutions, including the United Nations where she addressed the United Nations Trusteeship Council at the International Dialogue on Migration in March 2023.

== Awards and recognition ==
- Honored in the Forbes 30 Under 30 Local list for Puerto Rico, 2023.
- Featured in the 100 Women (BBC) in the category of politics and advocacy, 2023.
- Appointed as an African Youth Charter Hustler by the African Union and as a Young Leader by Women Deliver, 2020.
- Recognized by UN Women as a peace-builder in the Arab States, acknowledging her efforts in fostering peace and gender equality, 2020.
- Received the Emerging Leader Award from Saint Louis University in Madrid, 2022.

== Selected publications ==
- As SWANA feminists we are united for the liberation of Palestine, The New Arab
- Prioritizing Education and Gender Equality For Morocco's Earthquake Affected Women and Girls, United Nations Girls' Education Initiative
- We must invest in women and girls on the move to unlock their potential, UNICEF
