= Yasmine El-Mehairy =

Egyptian entrepreneur

- Born: Cairo, Egypt
- Education: Ain Shams University; University of Westminster; London Business School
- Known for: SuperMama

Yasmine El-Mehairy (Arabic: ياسمين المهيري) is an Egyptian entrepreneur and founder of the parenting website SuperMama. She was included in a 2014 volume compiled by the Wharton School of the University of Pennsylvania which featured 35 women who brought significant change to their chosen field.

== Early life and career ==
Born and raised in Cairo, El-Mehairy graduated from the Computer and Information College of Ain Shams University. After graduating with a Computer Science degree, El-Mehairy worked for IBM Cairo. While working there, El-Mehairy was granted a scholarship by the MBI Al Jaber Foundation to study at University of Westminster, and there, she studied Interactive Multimedia. In addition, she also studied business administration at the London Business School.

In 2011, El-Mehairy quit her job at an IT services company in Cairo to launch the website SuperMama together with Zeinab Samir and Sherine Al Samma. She also started a YouTube channel that focuses on female lifestyle.

== SuperMama ==
In October 2011, El-Mehairy launched the interactive parenting website SuperMama, the first website of its kind in the Arab world according to one of its backers, the Saudi media conglomerate MBC. According to El-Mehairy, the idea for the website arose after the pregnancy of her sister-in-law and aims to prepare future mothers for the challenges posed by motherhood. It seeks to raise awareness and discusses motherhood related issues while providing educational information.

== Recognition ==
El-Mehairy's work has been recognised with a number of awards, among which are first-place finishes at the NexGen IT Competition, the ArabNet Cairo Startup Demo Competition, and the eNovation competition. She was included in a 2014 volume compiled by the Wharton School of the University of Pennsylvania which featured 35 women who brought significant change to their chosen field. Her website SuperMama finished in first place at the Arab Business Projects Forum Competition while the website's team reached the semi-finals of the MIT Arab Enterprise Forum Business Plan Competition of 2010.

== See also ==
- SuperMama
