= Yasmin Abbasey =

Pakistani judge

Yasmin Abbasey is a retired Pakistani judge, who served in the Sindh High Court, where she was one of only two women judges at the time. Justice Abbasey previously served as judge in the lower courts. In the high court, most of her reported cases were in criminal law, despite her experience in administrative law, having served in Administrative Tribunals while serving as a puisne judge. She also served as Federal Law Secretary. She is also a former Federal Ombudsman for Harassment of Women at Workplace under the Harassment at Workplace Act, 2010.
