= Yasmeen Pir Mohammad Khan =

Pakistani politician

Yasmeen Pir Mohammad Khan MPA

Member of the Provincial Assembly of Khyber Pakhtunkhwa
- In office 2002–2018
- Constituency: WR-01 (appointed 2002); WR-20 (appointed 2013)

Personal details
- Born: 4 June 1954 (age 71) Utmanzai, Charsadda, Pakistan
- Party: Awami National Party (ANP)
- Occupation: Politician

Yasmeen Pir Mohammad Khan (Urdu: ياسمين پير محمد خان) is a Pakistani former politician. She served as a Member of the Provincial Assembly (MPA) of the Khyber Pakhtunkhwa Assembly, as a member of the Awami National Party (ANP). During her 2013–2018 term, she sat on three Standing Committees: Excise & Taxation; Population Welfare; and Transport.

While her constituency office was located in Saidu Sharif, Swat District, she occupied various constituency seats in the Khyber Pakhtunkhwa Assembly reserved for appointed (rather than elected) female MPAs, as assigned to her by the ANP: she was appointed to Constituency WR-01 from 2002 to 2007, then Constituency WR-20 from 2013 to 2018. While the 2013 to 2018 Assembly was her third consecutive appointment as an MPA, her constituency for 2008 to 2013 is not available.
