= Jeanne H. Freeland-Graves =

Jeanne H. Freeland-Graves is an American nutritionist, currently the Bess Heflin Centennial Professor at University of Texas at Austin. In 2007 she was awarded the Charles E. Ragus Award of the American Nutrition Association.
