= Yasmine d'Ouezzan =

French carom billiards player

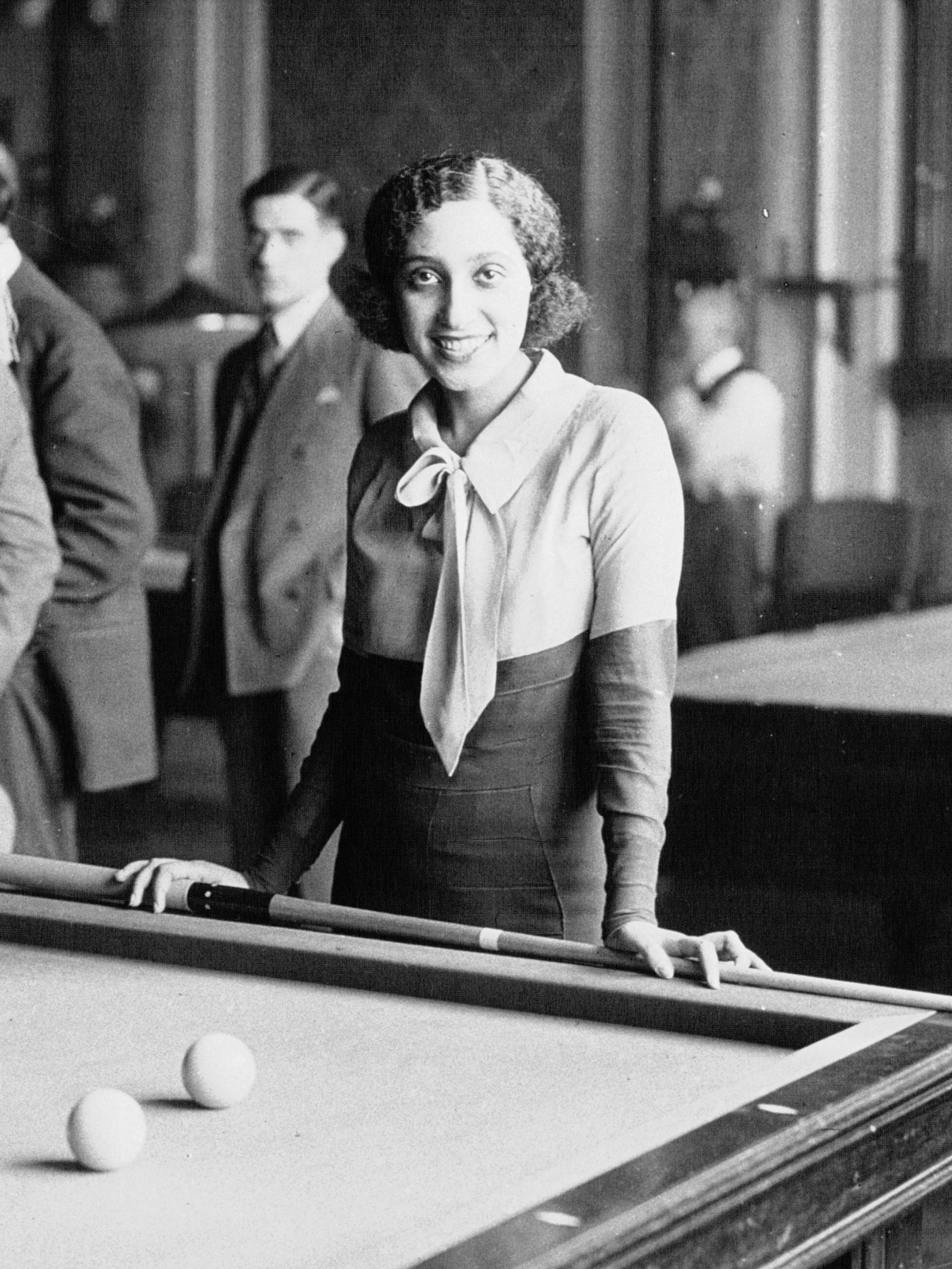
- Yasmine in 1932

Personal information
- Born: 9 January 1913 Saint-Étienne, France
- Died: 11 January 1997 (aged 84) Paris, France

Pool career
- Country: France

Tournament wins
- World Champion: 1932 (Carom billiards)

Yasmine d'Ouezzan (born 9 January 1913 in Saint-Étienne, France, died 11 January 1997 in Paris, France) was a French carom billiards player. D'Ouezzan was the first woman to win the women's French Billiards championship in 1932.

== Biography ==
The daughter of Moulay Brahim, a Moroccan chérif of the Ouezzan family, she became the first woman licensed by the French Billiards Federation in 1931, having trained with the professional Fouquet at the Billard Palace on the Boulevard des Capucines in Paris.

She won the inaugural women's title on 19 June 1932 and went on to win seven consecutive national titles before the Second World War interrupted her career.

In 2021, Catherine and François Schunck published a biography of her, Yasmine Moulay Brahim, princesse d'Ouezzan : une femme libre, through the publisher Secrets de pays.
