= Eysh Eysh =

"Eysh Eysh ايش ايش"

Single by Yasmine Nayar
- Released: 2016
- Recorded: 2016
- Genre: Arabic pop
- Length: 2:54
- Label: Yasmine Nayar
- Producer(s): Yasmine Nayar

Yasmine Nayar singles chronology
"Bechwech" (2016)	"Eysh Eysh ايش ايش" (2016)	"Enchanté" (2016)

"Eysh Eysh" "(What)" is a song recorded by the Algerian singer Yasmine Nayar in 2016 and released as a single in 2016. The song was a considerable success in its native Algeria and also managed to reach on the number one spot on a number of countries like Egypt, Syria, Jordan and Lebanon.
