= Yasmine Nayar =

Yasmine Nayar ياسمين نيار
- Birth name: Yasmine Nayar
- Born: July 24, 1990 (age 34); Algeria
- Genres: Arab pop, Arab Tarab, Arabic music, Algerian music, Middle Eastern music Dance
- Occupation(s): singer, actress, song writer
- Instrument(s): Guitar, drums, banjo, violin, harmonica, accordion, synthesizer vocals
- Years active: 2016–present
- Labels: Ajami Records
- Website: facebook.com/YasmineNayaronline

Yasmine Nayar (Arabic: ياسمين نيار) a Swiss - Algerian pop singer whose diverse vocal ability and style has attracted a following from different countries in the Arab world. Nayar started her music career at a young age; in 2016 she released her first single Bechwech. She released her second single Eysh Eysh in the same year.

== Discography ==
=== Singles ===
- Chkoun Gall ( 2018 )
- La Wela ( 2O17 )
- Eysh Eysh (Remix) (2017)
- Bechwech (2016)
- Eysh Eysh (2016)
- Enchanté song (2016)

== Videography ==
Official music videos
Year	Title	Director
2018	Chkoun Gall	Mahmoud Ramzi
2017	La Wela	Cristiano
2017	Eysh Eysh	Jad Shwery
2016	Bechwech	Ziad Khoury
