= Mehdi Azaiez =

French Quranic studies scholar

Mehdi Azaiez (born 1974) is a French Quranic studies scholar and professor of Islamic studies at the Catholic University of Louvain, Belgium. He is also a visiting professor at the Faculty of Theology and Religious Studies at Katholieke Universiteit Leuven.

== Biography ==
Mehdi Azaiez was born in Paris in 1974. He served as an assistant professor of Islamic theology at Katholieke Universiteit Leuven between 2014 and 2019. Before that, during 2012–2013, he taught Islamic studies and co-directed the international Qur’ân Seminar project at the University of Notre Dame in Indiana, United States. From 2013, he has been a member of the Publications and Research Committee for the International Quranic Studies Association. He also founded and edits the website Quran and Early Islam, which focuses on Quranic studies.

== Works ==
As author

- Le contre-discours coranique (The Quranic Counter-discourse) (2015)

As editor

- Le Coran: nouvelles approches (The Quran: New Approaches) (2013)
- The Qur'an Seminar Commentary / Le Qur'an Seminar. A Collaborative Study of 50 Qur'anic Passages / Commentaire collaboratif de 50 passages coraniques (2017)
- Le Coran : de la tribu à l’empire. Autour de l’œuvre de Jacqueline Chabbi (The Quran: from tribe to empire. Around the work of Jacqueline Chabbi) (2023)
- Qurʾānic Studies: Between History, Theology and Exegesis (2023)
- Itinerant Prophets:Rewritings, Appropriations and Metamorphoses of Prophetic Figures in the Religious, Literary and Historiographical Texts of Pre-modern Islam (2025) with Rémy Gareil and Iyas Hassan

== See also ==
- Quranic counter-discourse
