= Ulma Doyle Register =

American biochemist and Seventh-day Adventist

- Born: 4 February 1920; West Monroe, Louisiana
- Died: 17 July 1997 (aged 77); Loma Linda, California
- Occupation: Biochemist

Ulma Doyle Register (4 February 1920 – 17 July 1997) was an American biochemist, nutritionist, Seventh-day Adventist and vegetarianism activist known for his research on Vitamin B12. He was chairman of the Department of Nutrition at Loma Linda University School of Public Health.

== Biography ==
Register was born in West Monroe, Louisiana. He studied chemical engineering at Louisiana State University and obtained a B.S. degree from Madison College, Tennessee in 1942 and his M.S. degree from Vanderbilt University in 1944. He worked as a food chemist for Madison Foods, a company which manufactured meat alternatives. During his time at the company he became a vegetarian which he adopted for the rest of his life. He married Helen Hite in 1942. They had 3 daughters. His wife was a nutritionist at the San Bernardino County Department of Public Health.

In 1950, Register obtained a Ph.D. in biochemistry from University of Wisconsin and established a Vitamin B12 laboratory at Tulane University. In 1951, he joined Loma Linda College of Medical Evangelists Department of Biochemistry. In 1968, he became chair of the Department of Nutrition at the School of Public Health. His research demonstrated the nutritional adequacy of correctly formulated vegetarian diets, including essential amino acids.

During 1944–1992 he authored 62 scientific papers on nutrition. Register died from an accidental fall at his home in Loma Linda, California on 17 July 1997. The 1997 Third International Congress on Vegetarian Nutrition hosted by the Loma Linda University School of Public Health, Department of Nutrition recognized Register for his research on vegetarian diets. After his death, the School of Public Health established the U.D. Register Nutrition Research Fund.

== Vegetarianism ==
In 1972, Register was invited to speak on vegetarian diets at the 55th annual meeting of the American Dietetic Association and at their request he co-authored an education manual for dietitians on vegetarian diets. In 1974, he was invited by the Food and Nutrition Board of the National Research Council to write their statement on vegetarian diets.

In 1981, Register co-authored The Vegetarian Diet: Food For Us All with Lydia Sonnenberg and Kathleen Zolber, published by the American Dietetic Association. In 1987, he attended Loma Linda University’s First International Congress on Vegetarian Nutrition. Register was one of seven reviewers for the 1988 position of the American Dietetic Association on vegetarian diets.

== Selected publications ==
- The Vegetarian Diet: Scientific and Practical Considerations (1973)
- Safe Vegetarian Diets for Children (1977)
- It's Your World Vegetarian Cookbook (1981)
- The Vegetarian Diet: Food For Us All (with Lydia Sonnenberg and Kathleen Zolber, 1981)
- Nutritionally Adequate Vegetarian Diets (1983) In CRC Handbook of Nutritional Supplements.
- Vitamin B12 Studies in Total Vegetarians (Vegans) (1994)
