= Yasmin Khakoo =

Pediatric neurologist and editor (born 1964)

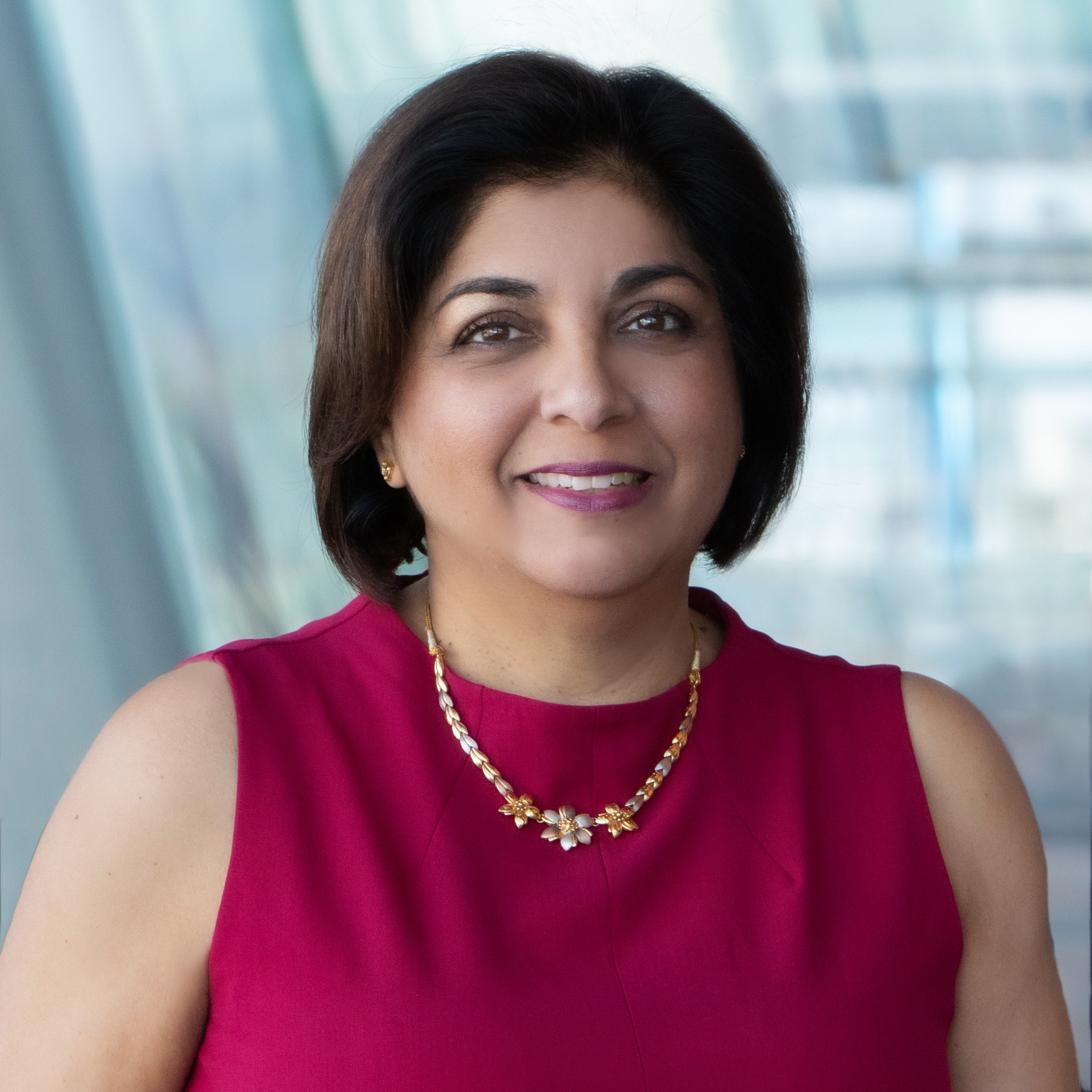
- Born: 1964 (age 61–62); New York City, New York State, U.S.
- Education: Barnard College, BA; Columbia University, MD
- Employer: Memorial Sloan Kettering Cancer Center
- Known for: Neurooncologist; Educator; Editor-in-Chief, Pediatric Neurology; President-Elect, Child Neurology Society
- Awards: Arnold P. Gold Foundation Humanism in Medicine Award, 2023; Elected Councilor for the East, Board of Directors, Child Neurology Society, 2023-2025; Pediatric Neurology Faculty Teaching Award, Weill Cornell Medical College; American Academy of Neurology Women Leading in Neurology Program 2019; Phi Beta Kappa
- Scientific career
- Fields: Neurooncology

Yasmin Khakoo (born 1964) is an Indian-American pediatric neuro-oncologist and editor-in-chief of the medical journal Pediatric Neurology 2022-2025. In 2023, she won the Arnold P. Gold Foundation Humanism in Medicine award of the Child Neurology Society for her mentorship and work with minorities and underserved communities. She is currently the President of the Child Neurology Society.

== Early life and education ==
Khakoo was born in the Bronx to parents of Indian and East African descent, and attended Riverdale County School in Riverdale, Bronx. She did her undergraduate studies at Barnard College, went to Columbia University for medical school, and then to the University of California, San Francisco for residency in pediatrics and child neurology.

== Career ==
Khakoo completed a fellowship in neurooncology at Memorial Sloan Kettering Cancer Center in New York City. She remained as a member and became child neurology director there in 2015.

Simultaneously she holds an academic position at Weill Cornell Medical College, where she became a full professor in 2020.

She is a fellow of the American Academy of Pediatrics and a fellow of the American Academy of Neurology, where she was selected for the "Women Leading in Neurology" program in 2019 and has served on the "Advancing Women in Academics" subcommittee since 2021. She served many years on the scientific selection and program planning committee for the Child Neurology Society, and was elected to the board as the councillor for the East, 2023-2025.

Scientifically, she focuses on neurocutaneous melanosis and is building a registry of children with this rare disease; paraneoplastic syndromes; and ependymomas.

She stepped into the role of editor-in-chief of Pediatric Neurology in 2022. Prior to that, she was on the editorial board of the Journal of Child Neurology, where she edited a special issue on pediatric neurooncology in 2016 and recorded a podcast as well.
