= Alice Garrett Marsh =

American dietitian

Alice G. Marsh
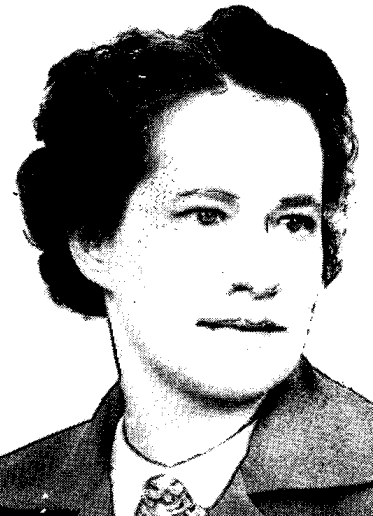
- Born: Alice Garrett; 20 February 1908; Berrien Center, Michigan
- Died: 26 July 1997 (aged 89); Berrien Springs, Michigan
- Occupation: Dietitian

Alice Garrett Marsh (20 February 1908 – 26 July 1997) was an American registered dietitian, Seventh-day Adventist and vegetarianism activist.

== Biography ==
Marsh was born in Berrien Center, Michigan. She obtained a B.S. in 1929 and a M.S. with a major in foods and nutrition from University of Nebraska in 1938. She worked as a dietitian at the Hinsdale Sanitarium (1929–1936) and was a research assistant at the University of Nebraska (1939–1944) under Ruth Leverton. Marsh was a professor of Home Economics at Union College (1947–1950). She authored the column "Nutrition in the News" for the Seventh-day Adventist magazine Life and Health (1944–1950).

She married biologist Frank Lewis Marsh on 21 May 1927. They had two children, Kendall and Sylvia. Marsh was employed as a nutrition researcher at Emmanuel Missionary College in 1950. In 1952, Marsh was studying haemoglobin and protein intake. In 1956, Marsh became chairwoman of the Home Economics Department at Andrews University.

Marsh was responsible for "Operation Nutrinaut" which was a study of the metabolic response of adolescent girls on a lacto-ovo vegetarian diet. It was conducted with Dwain L. Ford chair of the Chemistry Department. The project that started in 1963 was split into several phases that involved the study of sixteen young women on a "rigorously controlled diet" for 25 days. During the experiment, the subjects lived together on the third floor of the Life Sciences Building and their bodily excretions and blood samples were chemically analysed. More than 20,000 samples were collected over several years. Marsh, Ford and chief research assistant Dorothy K. Christensen published the results in the Journal of the American Dietetic Association in 1967. To date, the study is the largest collaborative research project that has been conducted at Andrews University.

Marsh retired in 1976. She was listed as a professor in the Home Economics Department at Andrews University until 1984.

She died in Berrien Springs, Michigan, aged 84.

== Vegetarianism ==
Marsh was known for her research on bone health and vegetarianism. In 1958, Marsh commented that lacto-ovo-vegetarian "is one of the world's very best diets".

Marsh attended Loma Linda University's First International Congress on Vegetarian Nutrition in 1987. She was one of seven reviewers for the 1988 position of the American Dietetic Association on vegetarian diets.

== Selected publications ==
- One Hundred Studies of the Calcium, Phosphorus, Iron, and Nitrogen Metabolism and Requirement of Young Women (with Ruth M. Leverton, 1942)
- Cortical Bone Density of Adult Lacto-Ovo-Vegetarian and Omnivorous Women (1980)
- About Nutrition (1986)
- Vegetarian Lifestyle and Bone Mineral Density (1988)
- Calcium Requirement and Diet (1989)
