= Kathleen Keen Zolber =

American dietitian

- Born: 9 December 1916; Walla Walla, Washington
- Died: 29 January 1999 (aged 82); Loma Linda, California
- Occupation: Dietitian

Esther Kathleen Keen Zolber (December 9, 1916 – January 29, 1999) was an American registered dietitian, Seventh-day Adventist and vegetarianism activist. She was president of the American Dietetic Association 1982–1983.

== Biography ==
Zolber was born Esther Kathleen Keen in Walla Walla, Washington. She obtained her BA in foods and nutrition from Walla Walla College in 1941 and after graduation worked as food service director and manager for the college store. Zolber obtained a master's degree from Washington State University in 1961 and returned to Walla Walla College as associate professor. She joined the Loma Linda University faculty where she taught at the School of Public Health's dietetic internship program. She received a PhD from University of Wisconsin–Madison in 1968.

She was associate professor of nutrition (1964–1972) at Loma Linda University, director of dietetic education (1967–1984), professor of nutrition (1973–1991), director of nutrition program (1984–1991) and director of dietetics at Loma Linda University Medical Center (1972–1984). In addition to teaching, Zolber was involved in nutritional research and was a dietetic technician on the health care team at Loma Linda University. Her articles were published in the Journal of the American Dietetic Association.

Zolber was a member of the California Dietetic Association and in 1978 received the Dolores Nyhus Memorial Award. She served on the Dietetic Internship Board and the board of directors of the American Dietetic Association (ADA). She was president of the ADA 1982–1983. While president she launched a capital campaign to establish the National Center for Nutrition and Dietetics.

Zolber married Melvin Zolber on September 19, 1937; they had no children. She was a member of the American Public Health Association, Delta Omega, Omicron Nu, and the Seventh-day Adventist Dietetic Association. In 1992, Zolber received the Marjorie Hulsizer Copher Award, the highest award given by the ADA.

== Vegetarianism ==
Zolber was a chairperson for Loma Linda University’s First International Congress on Vegetarian Nutrition in 1987. She was one of seven reviewers for the 1988 position of the American Dietetic Association on vegetarian diets.

== Selected publications ==
- Producing Meals Without Meat (1975)
- Diet Manual: Utilizing a Vegetarian Diet Plan (with Judy Dean Baloga, Marilyn Delinger, Margaret Kemmerer and Lydia Sonnenberg, 1978)
- The Vegetarian Diet: Food For Us All (with Ulma Doyle Register and Lydia Sonnenberg, 1981)
- Work Function Analysis of Vegetarian Entrée Production (1986)
