= Khaled Azaiez =

Tunisian footballer (born 1976)

Personal information
- Date of birth: 30 October 1976 (age 50)
- Place of birth: Tunisia
- Height: 1.87 m (6 ft 2 in)
- Position: Goalkeeper

Senior career*
Years	Team	Apps	(Gls)
1999–2006	Club Africain		
2006–2007	AS Marsa	15	(0)
2007–2008	Stade Gabésien	10	(0)

International career
2001–2004	Tunisia	5	(0)
Medal record
Men's football
Representing Tunisia
Africa Cup of Nations
Winner	2004 Tunisia
- * Club domestic league appearances and goals

Khaled Azaiez (Arabic: خالد عزيز; born 30 October 1976) is a Tunisian former professional footballer who played as a goalkeeper. He was part of the Tunisia national team squad that won the 2004 African Cup of Nations.

== Club career ==
Azaiez started his career at Club Africain, where he played for six seasons before moving to AS Marsa in 2006.

== International career ==
Azaiez played his first international match in 2001 and three years later was with the Tunisian national team to win the Africa Cup of Nations in 2004.

== Honours ==
Club Africain

- Tunisian Cup 1999–2000

AS Marsa

- Tunisian League Cup: 2006–07

Tunisia

- Africa Cup of Nations: 2004
