= Nagina Khan =

Pakistani politician

Nagina Khan MPA

Member of the Provincial Assembly of Khyber Pakhtunkhwa
- In office 29 May 2013 – 28 May 2018
- Constituency: Reserved seat for women

Nagina Khan (Urdu: نگینہ خان) is a Pakistani politician who served as a member of the 10th Provincial Assembly of Khyber Pakhtunkhwa.

== Education ==
Khan has a Master of Arts degree.

== Political career ==
Khan was elected to the Provincial Assembly of Khyber Pakhtunkhwa as a candidate of Pakistan Tehreek-e-Insaf on a reserved seat for women in the 2013 Pakistani general election. During her tenure as Member of the Khyber Pakhtunkhwa Assembly, she served as the Parliamentary Secretary of Khyber Pakhtunkhwa Assembly for Law and Parliamentary Affairs.

In May 2016, Khan joined a resolution to establish a Women's Caucus in the Provincial Assembly of Khyber Pakhtunkhwa. In March 2018, she was accused of horse-trading in the 2018 Senate election. Following which Imran Khan announced to expel her from the PTI and issued her a show cause notice to explain her position. In April 2018, she quit PTI and joined Pakistan Peoples Party.
