= Johanna T. Dwyer =

American nutrition scientist and dietician

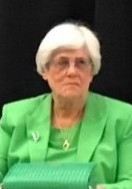
- Dwyer in 2019
- Education: Cornell University; Harvard School of Public Health; University of Wisconsin
- Scientific career
- Fields: Nutrition science, dietary supplements
- Workplaces: Harvard School of Public Health; Tufts University; National Institutes of Health

Johanna T. Dwyer is an American nutrition scientist and dietitian. She is a senior scientist at the National Institutes of Health's Office of Dietary Supplements and director of the Frances Stern Nutrition Center at Tufts Medical Center. Dwyer is a professor of nutrition at the Friedman School of Nutrition Science and Policy.

== Education ==
Dwyer completed undergraduate degree with distinction from Cornell University. She earned a D.Sc. and M.Sc. from the Harvard School of Public Health and an M.S. from the University of Wisconsin.

== Career ==
Dwyer was a faculty member of the Harvard School of Public Health. In 1969, she worked on the White House Conference on Food, Nutrition and Health. As part of the U.S. president's reorganization project, in 1976, Dwyer worked on the organization of nutrition research in the federal government. From 1980 to 1981, she was on the personal staffs of Richard Lugar (R-Indiana) and Barbara Mikulski (D-Maryland) as a Robert Wood Johnson Fellow.

At Tufts Medical Center, Dwyer is the Director of the Frances Stern Nutrition Center, Professor of Medicine (Nutrition) and Community Health at the Tufts University Medical School, and Professor of Nutrition at the Friedman School of Nutrition Science and Policy. She is also Senior Scientist at the Jean Mayer/USDA Human Nutrition Research Center on Aging at Tufts University.

Dwyer started in mid 2003 at as Dwyer a senior nutrition scientist at the National Institutes of Health (NIH) Office of Dietary Supplements (ODS) where she works under the Interagency Personnel Acquisition Program (IPA). At ODS her work involves the development of a Dietary Supplement Ingredient Database that will provide analytically substantiated values for key ingredients in dietary supplements. Dwyer directs activities on developing understanding of dietary supplement motivation and use on the part of Americans, and supervises a study involving secondary analyses of several large scale surveys of consumers on their motivations for the use of various dietary supplements.

Dwyer is the author or co-author of more than 200 original research articles and 280 review articles published in scientific journals on topics including preventing diet-related disease in children and adolescents; maximizing quality of life and health in the elderly; and vegetarian and other alternative lifestyles. In addition to her work as an academic and clinician, her interests in public policy and specifically nutrition policy have led to involvement and assignments in Washington, D.C. Work on such projects has included the organization of nutrition research in the Federal government of the United States, strengthening the role of human nutrition in the U.S. Department of Agriculture, and assuring that the national population-based nutrition surveys remain strong.

Dwyer has served as editor of the Nutrition Today. She is a registered dietitian.

== Awards and honors ==
In 1998, Dwyer was elected member of the Institute of Medicine, National Academy of Sciences. She is a fellow and past president of the American Institute of Nutrition and the Society for Nutrition Education and Behavior. She is a member of the Academy of Nutrition and Dietetics. In 2020, Dwyer received the Elaine R. Monsen Award for Outstanding Research Literature.
