= Yasmine Azaiez =

British-Tunisian violinist and composer

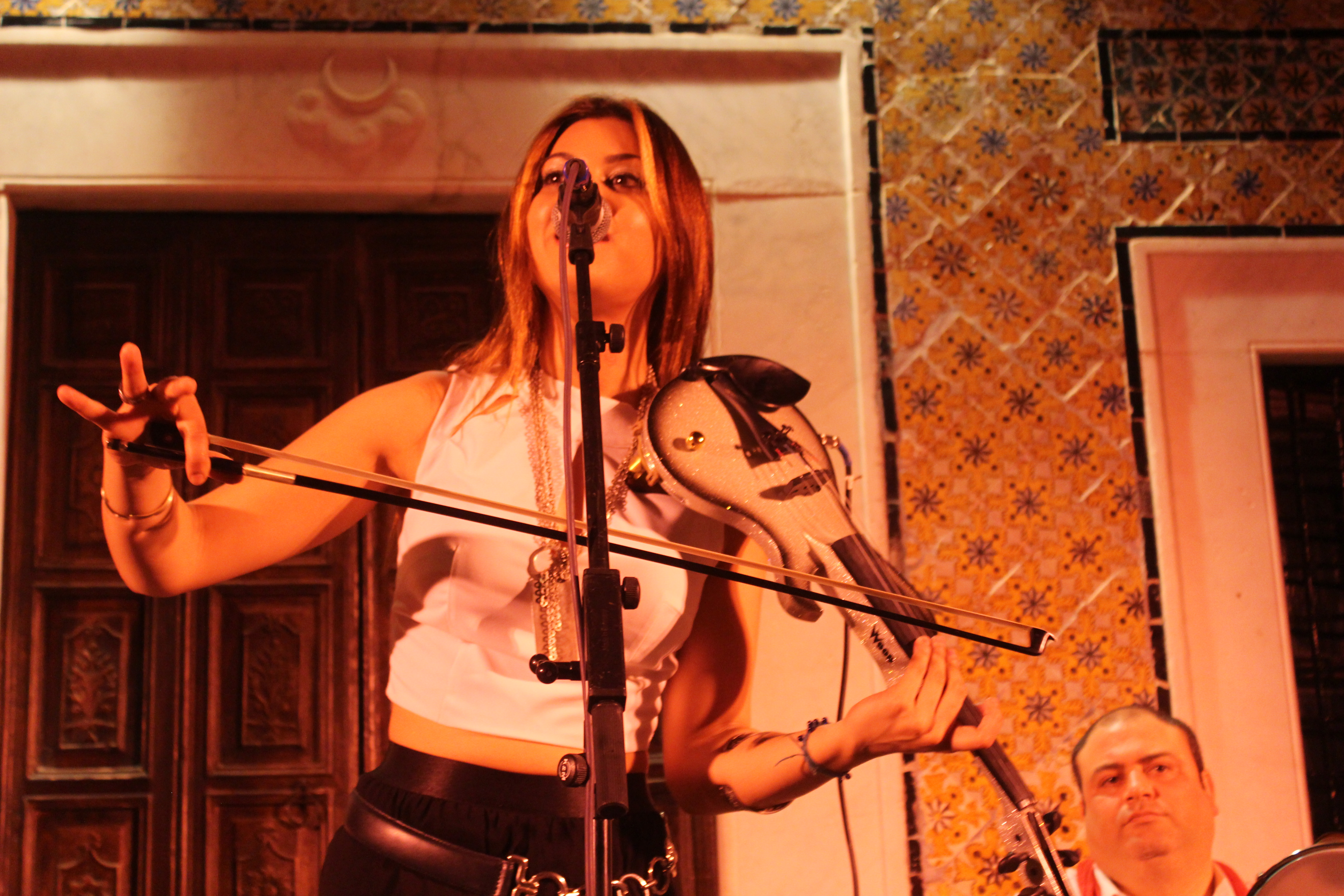
- Yasmine Azaiez on stage at the Medina Festival in Tunis in 2016

Background information
- Born: 16 October 1988 (age 37); London, England
- Genres: Jazz, Contemporary, Electronic, Oriental
- Occupations: Musician, actress, composer, singer
- Instrument: Violin
- Website: www.yasmineazaiez.net

Yasmine Azaiez (born 16 October 1988) is a British-born violinist of Tunisian descent who lives in Tunisia.

== Education ==
Azaiez began to play the violin when she was just four years old. When Yasmine was eight years old, she was accepted into the Yehudi Menuhin School in Surrey, England. She began performing on stage at around eleven years of age, and, when she was seventeen years old, she earned second place at the "Young Musician of the Year Competition" in Sevenoaks, Great Britain. The panel of that competition consisted of teachers from the Royal College of Music in London who praised her for her talent, professional approach, and stage presence. She continued her studies there until 2008. During her time at the Yehudi Menuhin School, she was an active participant in concerts put on by the school.

Azaiez moved to the United States when she was 18, having earned a spot at the New England Conservatory in Boston, Massachusetts. Later, in 2010, she was placed on the honor roll by the Dean of the Conservatory. In the same year, she was one of nine finalists in the Global Youth Violin Competition in Sydney, where she represented Africa and the Middle East.

== Musical Works and Performances ==
=== Albums and Discography ===
==== Fusion ====
'Fusion' was recorded in the United States in collaboration with keyboardist Shane Simpson, guitarist Phil Aelony, bassist Brad Barrett, drummer Steve Langone, percussionist Mohamed Abdelkader Bel Haj Kacem and saxophonist Dylan Sherry.

==== The 'Jazz' Album ====
The 'Jazz Album' was released on 13 November 2014.

1. Ode to Evan
2. Ode to Joe Morris
3. Black is the Color of my True Love's Hair
4. Ode to Self
5. Epistrophy
6. Ode to Cecil Taylor

==== After You Go ====
'After You Go' was released by The Wig & Panooc under Urban House Recordings on 10 June 2017 and features Yasmine Azaiez.

==== African Jasmine ====
On 20 January 2020 Yasmine released a new album (Live Session) African Jasmine, she came back with a new experience which brings new rhythms and sounds from the African continent.

The album contains five tracks:

1. Africa
2. Ble Bik
3. Blacker the Flower
4. Leila
5. African Jasmine

==== Music Videos ====
Yasmine has performed in Music Videos for her songs Neon Balloons and Fabulous.

=== Concerts and Tours ===
Azaiez has performed at well-known venues with well-known orchestras and musicians around the world. Notable sites include the Royal Albert Hall with Evgeny Kissin, The Merchant Taylors Hall alongside Sarah Chang, and the Sheldonian Theatre with Andras Schiff. In each of the aforesaid venues she played as a classical violinist. The Westminster Philharmonic, the Lebanese Symphony Orchestra, and the ‘ Balle de Vienne’ Orchestra have also featured her as a soloist in their concerts. Her work as an improviser has allowed her to collaborate with other globally recognized artists. She played with Naseer Shamma at the Cairo Opera House, Joe Morris at the Bimhuis, Quai de Branly in Paris, an dKinan Azmeh at the Royal Opera House in Muscat, as well as with Ramy Ayach, Agusti Fernandez, Rami Khalifa, Anthony Coleman, and Cory Pesaturo. Aside for performing for an audience, Yasmine also performed in a masterclass to Elvis Costello at the New England Conservatory in 2013 as well as masterclasses at the Royal Opera House of Oman, the Institute of Music in Tunisia, and at MIT in Massachusetts.

== In film ==
In the 2011 film Tunisians Stories, which was directed by Nada Mezni Hafaiedh, Yasmine plays the role of Shams, one of the main protagonists in the film. Along with acting in the film, Yasmine also composed the score for it. It was shown at festivals world-wide, including the Cannes Film Festival in 2012.
