= Stay (Friday Night Lights) =

- Friday Night Lights episode
- Episode no.: Season 4 Episode 6
- Directed by: Patrick Norris
- Written by: Bridget Carpenter
- Cinematography by: Todd McMullen
- Editing by: Stan Salfas
- Original release dates: December 9, 2009 (DirecTV); June 11, 2010 (NBC)
- Running time: 43 minutes

Guest appearances
- Zach Gilford as Matt Saracen; Minka Kelly as Lyla Garrity; Brad Leland as Buddy Garrity; Kim Dickens as Shelby Saracen; Steve Harris as Virgil Merriweather; Lorraine Toussaint as Birdie "Bird" Merriweather; Jeremy Sumpter as J.D. McCoy; Madison Burge as Becky Sproles

Episode chronology
← Previous "The Son"	Next → "In the Bag"
- Friday Night Lights (season 4)

"Stay" is the sixth episode of the fourth season of the American sports drama television series Friday Night Lights, inspired by the 1990 nonfiction book by H. G. Bissinger. It is the 56th overall episode of the series and was written by co-executive producer Bridget Carpenter, and directed by Patrick Norris. It originally aired on DirecTV's 101 Network on December 9, 2009, before airing on NBC on June 11, 2010.

The series is set in the fictional town of Dillon, a small, close-knit community in rural West Texas. It follows a high school football team, the Dillon Panthers. It features a set of characters, primarily connected to Coach Eric Taylor, his wife Tami, and their daughter Julie. In the episode, Matt and Julie leave for a musical festival in Austin, against her parents' protests. Meanwhile, Lyla visits Tim during her midterm break.

According to Nielsen Media Research, the episode was seen by an estimated 3.66 million household viewers and gained a 1.0/4 ratings share among adults aged 18–49. The episode received extremely positive reviews from critics, who praised the performances and character development, although some were divided over the ending.

== Plot ==
Julie (Aimee Teegarden) tells Matt (Zach Gilford) that she has tickets for the Austin City Limits Music Festival, but she hesitated in mentioning it due to his father's death. Matt states that he wants to go, feeling it should be a good distraction for his father's death. Tim (Taylor Kitsch) is visited by Lyla (Minka Kelly), who is staying for a while during midterm break. Even though things seem initially awkward between them, the two can't hold themselves back and rekindle their relationship.

Landry (Jesse Plemons) once again tries to flirt with Jess (Jurnee Smollett), and his tactics learned from his relationship with Tyra get him slapped. Vince (Michael B. Jordan) also tries to mend his past with Jess, but Virgil (Steve Harris) refuses to let him get involved again with his daughter. While watching a football game with Luke (Matt Lauria), he and Vince are approached by J.D. (Jeremy Sumpter) and other Panther team members, and Stan (Russell DeGrazier) is forced to intervene to prevent the conflict from escalating. Lyla hangs out with Tim, Billy (Derek Phillips) and Mindy (Stacey Oristano), although she admits that she does not plan in staying, causing melancholy between her and Tim due to knowing they will soon have to separate again.

Even though her parents disapprove of her going to Austin during school days, Julie decides to leave with Matt anyway. Tami (Connie Britton) angrily calls her daughter, who ignores her calls and does not tell Matt about her decision. Tami asks Landry for details, but he has limited knowledge of the event. Landry calls Matt to warn him, causing Matt to get mad at Julie for not telling him that her parents disapproved of the trip as he feels it will make him look bad. While strongly considering going to Austin to confront her daughter, Tami decides to not do it, although she confides in Eric (Kyle Chandler) that she is scared her daughter is leaving. At the festival, Julie finally admits that she fears Matt may leave Dillon, so he comforts her.

The Lions face off against the McNulty Mavericks, after Eric and the team make awkward TV interviews over the game. While the Lions show promise in the field, they still end up with a 14-7 loss. Even though both Tim and Lyla are now aware that they still love each other very much, Tim realizes that having her stay would hold her back from her dreams, so the two tearfully part ways again as Lyla returns to college. Matt drops off Julie at her house, where she cries as she apologizes to Tami for her actions. The following day, Matt is seen leaving Dillon, finally at peace with himself.

== Production ==
=== Development ===
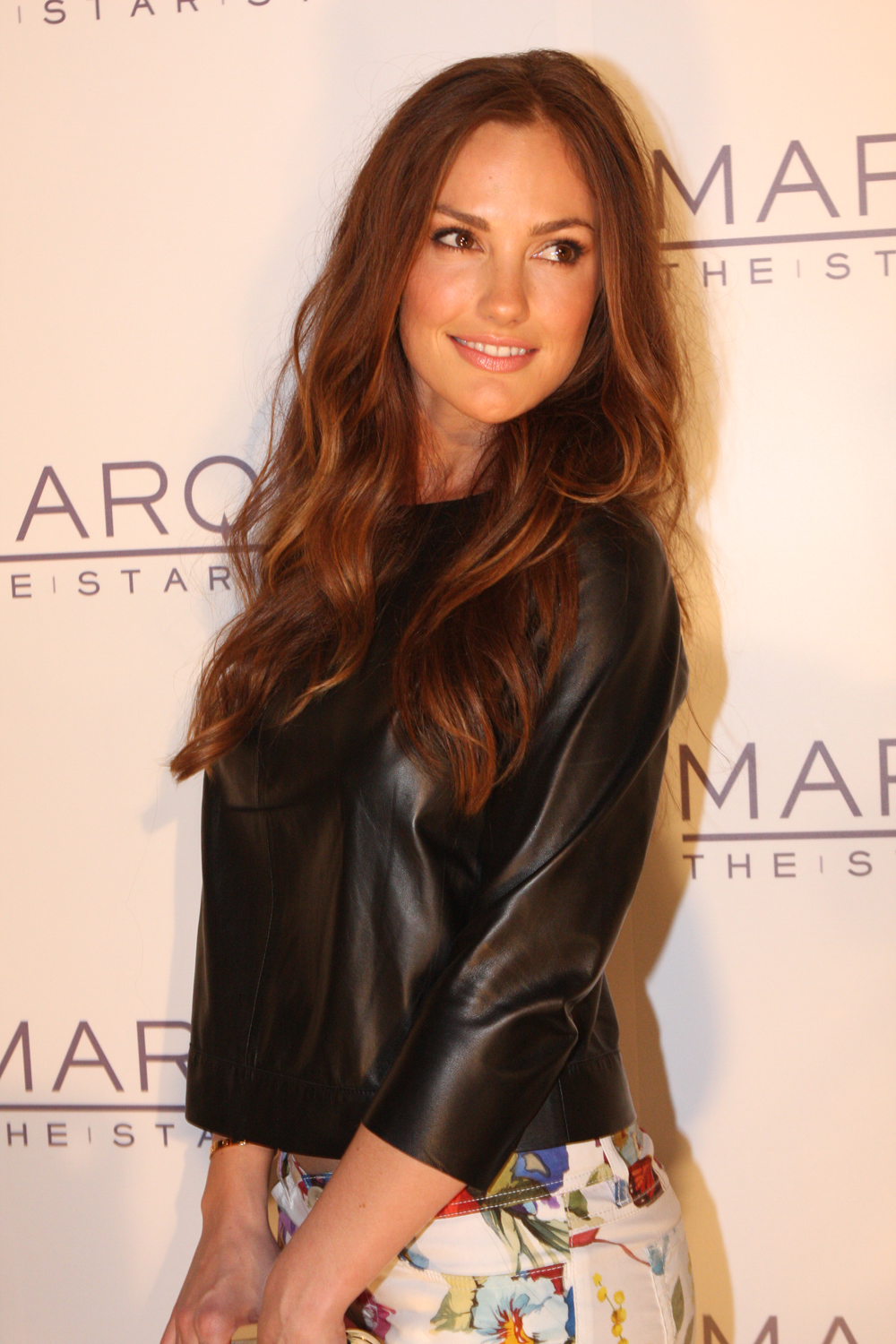
The episode marked Minka Kelly's last appearance in the series.

The episode was written by co-executive producer Bridget Carpenter, and directed by Patrick Norris. This was Carpenter's seventh writing credit, and Norris' fifth directing credit.

=== Casting ===
In April 2009, reports suggested that Minka Kelly would leave the series after the third season. Jason Katims confirmed that the episode would be Kelly's final appearance in the series, saying "I thought her final episode was so powerful. We talked about bringing her back, but I didn't really feel like anything we came up with beat the [Tim-Lyla] story in that episode, which I thought was really poignant. It wasn't a happy ending, but it was a really satisfying ending for me. It was a satisfying resolution to that story line."

== Reception ==
=== Viewers ===
In its original American broadcast on NBC, "Stay" was seen by an estimated 3.66 million household viewers with a 1.0/4 in the 18–49 demographics. This means that 1 percent of all households with televisions watched the episode, while 4 percent of all of those watching television at the time of the broadcast watched it. This was a 5% decrease in viewership from the previous episode, which was watched by an estimated 3.83 million household viewers with a 1.1/4 in the 18–49 demographics.

=== Critical reviews ===
"Stay" received extremely positive reviews from critics. Eric Goldman of IGN gave the episode a "good" 7.9 out of 10 and wrote, "While there was still plenty of angst to behold, 'Stay' certainly wasn't as heavy as 'The Son' – and nor would I want it to be. After an episode like that, you need some time to decompress, though on Friday Night Lights, that still means there's going to be plenty of emotional content."

Keith Phipps of The A.V. Club gave the episode an "A–" grade and wrote, "Under other circumstances, Matt would never leave Dillon without saying goodbye to his family and friends. But these aren’t other circumstances. In the end, leaving Dillon might be just another action he took while feeling he had no other choice." Ken Tucker of Entertainment Weekly wrote, "I thought this week's amazing romantic scenes between Taylor Kitsch and Minka Kelly were extraordinary; Kitsch in particular gave a tremendously subtle performance."

Alan Sepinwall wrote, "Last week's "The Son" was always going to be a tough act to follow, particularly in the Matt scenes. And "Stay" didn't help its cause by being fuzzy about many things Matt-related." Allison Waldman of TV Squad wrote, "All in all, a good episode - but I want to see Matt come back or call home in a future show. I need more closure on his story."

Andy Greenwald of Vulture wrote, "We forgot to go the Kleenex store this week, and we'd hate to ruin our new East Dillon hoodies with another week of deep, racking, TV-induced sobs. And so, 'Stay' — a good-but-not-great episode devoted to extended goodbyes." Matt Richenthal of TV Fanatic wrote, "It was understandable the show didn't wanna reach into the heavy, emotional well for Saracen two weeks in a row - and any episode would be a let down after "The Son" - but this ending felt too ambiguous."

Todd Martens of Los Angeles Times wrote, "On the bright side, he’ll be back for at least two episodes this season, and will remain, like other major characters who left, part of the Dillon narrative. But there won't be any time to sulk. Life, as Friday Night Lights continues to illustrate, will get in the way." Television Without Pity wrote, "Lyla comes back to town just long enough to remind herself how much she loves Tim Riggins and how much it won't ever work between them. They spend three days in his trailer and, oh, if only the whole world were a ochre-lit Airstream trailer in the warm early Texas fall."

=== Accolades ===
Minka Kelly submitted the episode for consideration for Outstanding Guest Actress in a Drama Series at the 62nd Primetime Emmy Awards. Patrick Norris also submitted this episode for consideration for Outstanding Directing for a Drama Series.
