= A Sort of Homecoming (Friday Night Lights) =

- Friday Night Lights episode
- Episode no.: Season 4 Episode 4
- Directed by: Christopher Misiano
- Written by: Etan Frankel
- Cinematography by: Todd McMullen
- Editing by: Angela M. Catanzaro
- Original release dates: November 18, 2009 (DirecTV); May 28, 2010 (NBC)
- Running time: 43 minutes

Guest appearances
- Zach Gilford as Matt Saracen; Alicia Witt as Cheryl Sproles; Brad Leland as Buddy Garrity; Kim Dickens as Shelby Saracen; Steve Harris as Virgil Merriweather; Jeremy Sumpter as J.D. McCoy; Madison Burge as Becky Sproles

Episode chronology
← Previous "In the Skin of a Lion"	Next → "The Son"
- Friday Night Lights (season 4)

"A Sort of Homecoming" is the fourth episode of the fourth season of the American sports drama television series Friday Night Lights, inspired by the 1990 nonfiction book by H. G. Bissinger. It is the 54th overall episode of the series and was written by Etan Frankel, and directed by Christopher Misiano. It originally aired on DirecTV's 101 Network on November 18, 2009, before airing on NBC on May 28, 2010.

The series is set in the fictional town of Dillon, a small, close-knit community in rural West Texas. It follows a high school football team, the Dillon Panthers. It features a set of characters, primarily connected to Coach Eric Taylor, his wife Tami, and their daughter Julie. In the episode, Eric tries to find a place to host a pep rally, while tensions arise between Vince and Luke. Meanwhile, Landry questions his friendship with Jess, and Matt accompanies Tim in hunting.

According to Nielsen Media Research, the episode was seen by an estimated 3.53 million household viewers and gained a 1.0/4 ratings share among adults aged 18–49. The episode received critical acclaim, with critics praising the performances, character development and ending.

== Plot ==
During practice, Vince (Michael B. Jordan) and Luke (Matt Lauria) continue arguing, upsetting Eric (Kyle Chandler), especially when Luke blames Vince for his wallet's disappearance. Tim (Taylor Kitsch) buys rifles to go out with Billy (Derek Phillips) during hunting season, but is disappointed when Billy has to decline to participate due to Mindy's pregnancy.

Eric is preparing a pep rally to raise funds for the Lions, planning to sell it as "a sort of homecoming" for the high school. Eric also meets with Buddy (Brad Leland), who reveals he left the Panthers due to Joe's change of regime. Eric visits Virgil (Steve Harris), questioning him about his past as a former football star. He asks Virgil to help with the pep rally and motivate the team, but Virgil is not interested in revisiting the past. Tami (Connie Britton) is told that there are not enough funds for a new school library, as many people have pulled out due to her decision in pushing Luke into East Dillon.

Devin (Stephanie Hunt) asks Julie (Aimee Teegarden) to accompany her to Steers, a gay bar. Devin reiterates that she does not have feelings towards Julie, but wants a friend to be with her as she has never visited one before. There, Julie notices Stan (Russell DeGrazier). Landry (Jesse Plemons) is invited by Jess (Jurnee Smollett) to a party, where he has fun with her friends. However, Jess is approached by Vince, and she rejects his advances by claiming that Landry is her boyfriend. The following day, Vince asks Landry about his "relationship" with Jess, but Landry denies anything. Later, Vince is confronted again by Luke over the wallett and they brutally fight until they are arrested by the police. While Luke is released, Vince will be sent to juvie, but Eric intervenes to prevent it.

After Jess talks with him, Virgil finally agrees in letting the BBQ host the pep rally. During the event, Landry kisses Jess, despite both agreeing that they are not dating. Matt (Zach Gilford) accompanies Tim in hunting, and the two bond as they share stories of their recent decisions. Matt opens up about his decision to stay in Dillon, finally confessing that it was because of Julie, while Tim states that college life was not suited for him and admits that, even though he let her go because their paths were different, he misses Lyla. At home, while watching over Lorraine (Louanne Stephens), Shelby (Kim Dickens) is visited by army representatives. Tim drops off Matt at Julie's house, wanting to apologize for an earlier discussion. However, a teary Julie tells Matt that his father has been killed in Iraq.

== Production ==
=== Development ===
The episode was written by Etan Frankel, and directed by Christopher Misiano. This was Frankel's first writing credit, and Misiano's first directing credit.

== Reception ==
=== Viewers ===
In its original American broadcast on NBC, "A Sort of Homecoming" was seen by an estimated 3.53 million household viewers with a 1.0/4 in the 18–49 demographics. This means that 1 percent of all households with televisions watched the episode, while 4 percent of all of those watching television at the time of the broadcast watched it. This was a 11% decrease in viewership from the previous episode, which was watched by an estimated 3.96 million household viewers with a 1.1/4 in the 18–49 demographics.

=== Critical reviews ===
"A Sort of Homecoming" received critical acclaim. Eric Goldman of IGN gave the episode an "amazing" 9 out of 10 and wrote, "Wow. How this show can continue to be this emotionally wrenching and involving is a mystery. Week after week, Friday Night Lights manages to feel genuine and moving in a way few TV series ever achieve."

Keith Phipps of The A.V. Club gave the episode a "B+" grade and wrote, "Saracen needs to get away more than Riggins, however, if only to unpack the resentment he feels toward Julie for imagining a life away from him and to finally admit he stayed in Dillon for her sake. The kid's got problems. And as the episode ends, we learn his troubles have just begun." Ken Tucker of Entertainment Weekly wrote, "Friday Night Lights committed some minor sins last night, but I'm willing to forgive almost all of them just for the sight of Tim Riggins in a hunting cap he wore with intentional ironic goofiness while on a hunting trip with Matt Saracen."

Alan Sepinwall wrote, "I'm not saying that the plotting in Friday Night Lights needs to be airtight all the time. It's a show about character, and place. It's just that the characters and their world felt as fuzzy as the storytelling for a lot of 'Some Kind of Homecoming.'" Allison Waldman of TV Squad wrote, "Life is what happens while you're busy making plans. Matt hasn't exactly been the architect of his future, but the Dillon former quarterback has been plugging along. This week found Saracen in the cross hairs emotionally."

Andy Greenwald of Vulture wrote, "Our jaws are on the floor. Our hearts are in our throats. And our hands are applauding the best episode yet in the sterling fourth season of the official Best Show on TV." Todd Martens of Los Angeles Times wrote, "Four episodes into its fourth season, Friday Night Lights continues to barrel helmet-first into big-picture issues, covering topics of gender, race and death Wednesday night." Television Without Pity gave the episode an "A" grade.
