= In the Skin of a Lion (Friday Night Lights) =

- Friday Night Lights episode
- Episode no.: Season 4 Episode 3
- Directed by: Patrick Norris
- Written by: Patrick Massett; John Zinman
- Cinematography by: Todd McMullen
- Editing by: Stephen Michael
- Original release dates: November 11, 2009 (DirecTV); May 21, 2010 (NBC)
- Running time: 43 minutes

Guest appearances
- Zach Gilford as Matt Saracen; Brad Leland as Buddy Garrity; D. W. Moffett as Joe McCoy; Madison Burge as Becky Sproles; John Diehl as Richard Sherman; Barry Tubb as Tom Cafferty

Episode chronology
← Previous "After the Fall"	Next → "A Sort of Homecoming"
- Friday Night Lights (season 4)

"In the Skin of a Lion" is the third episode of the fourth season of the American sports drama television series Friday Night Lights, inspired by the 1990 nonfiction book by H. G. Bissinger. It is the 53rd overall episode of the series and was written by co-executive producers Patrick Massett and John Zinman, and directed by Patrick Norris. It originally aired on DirecTV's 101 Network on November 11, 2009, before airing on NBC on May 21, 2010.

The series is set in the fictional town of Dillon, a small, close-knit community in rural West Texas. It follows a high school football team, the Dillon Panthers. It features a set of characters, primarily connected to Coach Eric Taylor, his wife Tami, and their daughter Julie. In the episode, Eric struggles in finding money for the Lions' new uniform. Meanwhile, Matt questions his internship, while Tim is worried about Becky's life.

According to Nielsen Media Research, the episode was seen by an estimated 3.96 million household viewers and gained a 1.1/4 ratings share among adults aged 18–49. The episode received very positive reviews from critics, with Kyle Chandler receiving critical acclaim for his performance.

== Plot ==
Eric (Kyle Chandler) makes the Lions participate in a fundraiser, in which they will move a car across town in order to get money for their new uniforms. However, Eric actually employs Tim (Taylor Kitsch) to pass money to pedestrians as "donations". Eric also has no support from the principal, who warns him that he cannot cancel any more games or the football program would be shut down.

Eric assigns Luke (Matt Lauria) as a defensive back, and also changes Landry (Jesse Plemons) to the kicker position. Tim helps him as part of the coaching staff, watching over Luke as the latter feels dejected. At the same time, Vince (Michael B. Jordan) is worried that Eric will select Luke as the running back. Eric is told by Buddy (Brad Leland) that Joe (D. W. Moffett) is suspecting that Buddy told Eric about the mailbox, and so Buddy starts getting paranoid that Joe may be watching over him. In a desperate attempt to find money for the uniforms, Eric makes a $3,000 check on behalf of the Taylors to several business partnerships, angering Tami (Connie Britton).

Matt continues visiting Richard Sherman (John Diehl), who only assigns him to collect scraps. He eventually has Matt drive him 200 miles to a bar, explaining that selfishness is the most important tool for an artist and that Matt must focus solely on himself to be successful. Tim continues giving rides to school to Becky (Madison Burge), although he is concerned about her encounters with a man whom he believes to be her boyfriend. Landry struggles with his new position, so Jess (Jurnee Smollett) helps him with the help of several kids.

Eric visits Luke at home, convincing him in "leading" the team by promising to make sure Luke's future is not impacted. He also apologizes to Tami for the check, and presents the Lions with their new uniforms. At a party with Joe's friends, Buddy admits that it was him who put the mailbox, twelve years before, and told Eric about it, stating he does not believe in what the Panthers represent now and thus not feeling part of them anymore, especially since Joe joined them. Julie (Aimee Teegarden) visits Richard's yard, who tells her that she is holding Matt back from his potential. Julie asks Matt about it, and he states that she should ignore him. The Lions are losing their next game; although Luke helps the team in intercepting, Vince is underperforming. Eric gets Landry to deliver a field goal, but he actually passes the football to Vince, who scores the first touchdown for East Dillon. While they still lose 27-6, they are happy at their improvement. Matt visits Richard, finding that he has made a winged sculpture with the scraps.

== Production ==
=== Development ===
The episode was written by co-executive producers Patrick Massett and John Zinman, and directed by Patrick Norris. This was Massett's eighth writing credit, Zinman's eighth writing credit, and Norris' fourth directing credit.

== Reception ==
=== Viewers ===
In its original American broadcast on NBC, "In the Skin of a Lion" was seen by an estimated 3.96 million household viewers with a 1.1/4 in the 18–49 demographics. This means that 1.1 percent of all households with televisions watched the episode, while 4 percent of all of those watching television at the time of the broadcast watched it. This was a slight decrease in viewership from the previous episode, which was watched by an estimated 3.97 million household viewers with a 1.3/5 in the 18–49 demographics.

=== Critical reviews ===
"In the Skin of a Lion" received very positive reviews from critics. Eric Goldman of IGN gave the episode a "great" 8.5 out of 10 and wrote, "At least we got to see Eric go off on Vince though, for first failing to block for Luke and then daring to talk back to Eric about it – Kyle Chandler is absolutely on fire this season when it comes to showing the fury of Eric Taylor unleashed."

Keith Phipps of The A.V. Club gave the episode a "B+" grade and wrote, "I'm not sure Friday Night Lights has drawn that great a distinction between the football madness of previous seasons and this one, but with Moffett as the figurehead, it doesn't necessarily have to. The way he looks over those glasses when confronted by Tami or Coach or, now, Buddy makes him the most punchable man on television." Ken Tucker of Entertainment Weekly wrote, "One of the best things about Friday Night Lights this season is one of the worst things happening to Coach Eric — his overwhelming feelings of frustration at his new job, his new team's lousy skills, his unconscious neglect of his family during these trying professional times. Kyle Chandler is playing all this material beautifully. Last night, it couldn't have been easy to do all that constant yelling at the team without becoming a hoarse nag, but Chandler pulled it off."

Alan Sepinwall wrote, "Having established the new world of East Dillon and its most notable residents over the first two episodes, a busier-than-usual Friday Night Lights gets to showing us how lost so many of our characters are in this new place and/or their new roles." Allison Waldman of TV Squad wrote, "There's so much that's right about Friday Night Lights this new season that it probably sounds like I'm overdoing it with the positive notices. However, the way they've shaken up Eric and Tami's life together in Dillon has been terrific."

Andy Greenwald of Vulture wrote, "The big headlines in East Dillon this week would be about how the football team doesn't have enough money to pay for new uniforms. Why do they need new uniforms? Oh, that's right. Because last week Coach, like an Iron John–reading Beavis, encouraged his team to burn their old ones in an oil drum. Way to plan ahead, Coach." Todd Martens of Los Angeles Times wrote, "The fourth season of Friday Night Lights continues to explore a sense of desperation, throwing its characters into unfamiliar and uncomfortable terrain. But it's doing so to great dramatic effect. Kyle Chandler's Eric Taylor has been tested before, but writers and producers are putting him through the wringer and adding a deeper dynamic to Eric’s marriage to Connie Britton's Tami." Television Without Pity gave the episode an "A–" grade.
