= After the Fall (Friday Night Lights) =

- Friday Night Lights episode
- Episode no.: Season 4 Episode 2
- Directed by: Michael Waxman
- Written by: Kerry Ehrin
- Cinematography by: Todd McMullen
- Editing by: Stan Salfas
- Original release dates: November 4, 2009 (DirecTV); May 14, 2010 (NBC)
- Running time: 43 minutes

Guest appearances
- Zach Gilford as Matt Saracen; Alicia Witt as Cheryl Sproles; Brad Leland as Buddy Garrity; D. W. Moffett as Joe McCoy; Steve Harris as Virgil Merriweather; Jeremy Sumpter as J.D. McCoy; Madison Burge as Becky Sproles; John Diehl as Richard Sherman

Episode chronology
← Previous "East of Dillon"	Next → "In the Skin of a Lion"
- Friday Night Lights (season 4)

"After the Fall" is the second episode of the fourth season of the American sports drama television series Friday Night Lights, inspired by the 1990 nonfiction book by H. G. Bissinger. It is the 52nd overall episode of the series and was written by consulting producer Kerry Ehrin, and directed by producer Michael Waxman. It originally aired on DirecTV's 101 Network on November 4, 2009, before airing on NBC on May 14, 2010.

The series is set in the fictional town of Dillon, a small, close-knit community in rural West Texas. It follows a high school football team, the Dillon Panthers. It features a set of characters, primarily connected to Coach Eric Taylor, his wife Tami, and their daughter Julie. In the episode, Eric loses support among the football team, while Tami faces controversy due to a loophole. Meanwhile, Tim tries to find a new home while Matt works with a local artist.

According to Nielsen Media Research, the episode was seen by an estimated 3.97 million household viewers and gained a 1.3/5 ratings share among adults aged 18–49. The episode received very positive reviews from critics, who praised the performances, themes and storylines. For her performance, Connie Britton received a nomination for Outstanding Lead Actress in a Drama Series at the 62nd Primetime Emmy Awards.

== Plot ==
Eric (Kyle Chandler) is harshly criticized for deciding to forfeit the game, to the point that pedestrians place signs with the word "quitter" on his yard. Buddy (Brad Leland) takes Eric to an empty field, where running back Luke Cafferty (Matt Lauria) "lives". Luke was in the Panthers JV team, but Buddy has discovered that he is actually eligible to play for East Dillon and lied about his address to continue with the Panthers.

Matt is assigned to serve an internship under the eye of local artist Richard Sherman (John Diehl). Matt is disgusted by Richard's erratic behavior, as he only has him collect scraps in his backyard. Tim (Taylor Kitsch) works for Billy (Derek Phillips) at the repair shop, complaining that he has not been paid due to the lack of clients. During an argument, Billy assigns him to take his truck and tow a client who just called. The client is revealed to be Becky (Madison Burge), who wants a ride to school. Landry (Jesse Plemons) accidentally hits the bike of student Jess Merriweather (Jurnee Smollett). Later, Landry finds her working at a BBQ with her father, Virgil (Steve Harris).

Tami (Connie Britton) informs Luke that his lie has been discovered, and that he will need to attend East Dillon the following day. A devastated Luke complies, despite having worked to play for the Panthers. This upsets Joe (D. W. Moffett) and Wade (Drew Waters), as it means the Panthers' previous win will be forfeited. They try to get her to change her mind, with Joe going as far as to say that Eric knew about the open field in previous seasons and could result in their previous championships forfeited. She confronts Eric about the mailbox, with Eric denying being involved. Tami visits Joe with his friends at a diner, telling him she remains committed to her plan and that he can go ahead with his threat, upsetting his friends. During a school conference, Tami is booed by the students.

Eric starts losing support in the team, especially from Landry, with Vince (Michael B. Jordan) not showing up to practice. He visits Vince's mother and gives her $20 to give him his location. As he awaits for him at a gas station, he converses with a pedestrian (Mike Leach), who tells him that he needs to find his "inner pirate." When Vince ignores him, Eric decides to implement a Saturday night practice. As he laments on the open field, he is visited by Tim, who offers to help him in anything he needs. Vince angrily returns the $20 to Eric, telling him he should not have been involved. Eric asks Vince to once again reconsider and not quit on him.

On Saturday night, the Lions surprisingly show up at practice, much to Eric's relief, and are joined by Luke too. After apologizing to the team for deciding to forfeit the game and preventing them to have their chance to prove themselves until the end, Eric burns the previous game tapes on a dumpster, proclaiming that their new path is the present. The team accepts Eric's proposition, and they join in burning their jersey shirts. At a bar, Tim tells Cheryl (Alicia Witt), the bartender, about his homelessness. Cheryl offers him to live temporarily in a trailer in her backyard for $100 a month, which he accepts. Eric joins Tami at the couch, who admits that despite feeling bad over being booed, she felt good about standing up to Joe and his friends. Eric finally admits to having lied about the mailbox and apologizes.

== Production ==
=== Development ===
The episode was written by consulting producer Kerry Ehrin, and directed by producer Michael Waxman. This was Ehrin's ninth writing credit, and Waxman's fifth directing credit.

== Reception ==
=== Viewers ===
In its original American broadcast on NBC, "After the Fall" was seen by an estimated 3.97 million household viewers with a 1.3/5 in the 18–49 demographics. This means that 1.3 percent of all households with televisions watched the episode, while 5 percent of all of those watching television at the time of the broadcast watched it. This was a slight increase in viewership from the previous episode, which was watched by an estimated 3.90 million household viewers with a 1.2/5 in the 18–49 demographics.

=== Critical reviews ===
"After the Fall" received very positive reviews from critics. Eric Goldman of IGN gave the episode a "great" 8 out of 10 and wrote, "Eric having the team burn their uniforms, as a way of symbolizing a new beginning, was an effective visual – but the entire time I was thinking, "How the hell will he replace them?!" That being the case, I was glad to see that fact was immediately brought up in the final scene."

Keith Phipps of The A.V. Club gave the episode an "A–" grade and wrote, "there's the moment when Coach starts to pick the team up again, the whole team, even those who walked out after his tirade last week it seems, by burning the game tapes and the uniforms and everything left to remind them of the half-assed squad they were before and hopefully never will be again. But it's going to take a lot of pirate spirit and if I know the show at all it's going to make sure we see just how tough it is to climb back from the bottom." Ken Tucker of Entertainment Weekly wrote, "I thought this was a highly satisfying entry. Give me a little more Joe McCoy and a dollop more Buddy Garrity, and we'll have ourselves a helluva season."

Alan Sepinwall wrote, "By the end of the episode, it looks like both sides are willing to learn more about the other - Eric recognizes he made a mistake in giving money to Vince's mom, and Vince gets the team to show up for the special practice - but this isn't going to come easy for anybody." Allison Waldman of TV Squad wrote, "The burning of the game tapes and the team jerseys was a symbolic way to bring them all back together. Now Eric just has to worry about finding new uniforms for his players."

Andy Greenwald of Vulture wrote, "So now we've got the band team back together! They just need some new uniforms. And (we're guessing) a new name. Bravo." Matt Richenthal of TV Fanatic wrote, "kudos to the show for slowing integrating news characters. The snippets we got of Luke and Jess this week made us anxious to learn more about them."

Todd Martens of Los Angeles Times wrote, "‘You’ve got to find your inner pirate,’ a crackpot at a gas station had earlier said to a down-in-the-dumps Eric. Indeed, the Taylors flashed their swords in Episode 2, but this fight is just beginning." Television Without Pity gave the episode an "A+" grade.

=== Accolades ===
Connie Britton submitted the episode to support her nomination for Outstanding Lead Actress in a Drama Series at the 62nd Primetime Emmy Awards.
