= List of Friday Night Lights characters =

Friday Night Lights is an American television drama series that aired on NBC and DirecTV's The 101 Network from 2006 to 2011. The series is based on the non-fiction book of the same name. Set in the fictional town of Dillon, Texas, the show focuses on a high school varsity football team. Several characters in the series are adapted from individuals depicted in the original book.

== Cast ==
Main cast of Friday Night Lights
Actor	Character	Season				
Actor	Character	S1	S2	S3	S4	S5
Kyle Chandler	Eric Taylor	Main	Main	Main	Main	Main
Connie Britton	Tami Taylor	Main	Main	Main	Main	Main
Aimee Teegarden	Julie Taylor	Main	Main	Main	Main	Main
Taylor Kitsch	Tim Riggins	Main	Main	Main	Main	Recurring
Jesse Plemons	Landry Clarke	Main	Main	Main	Main	Guest
Zach Gilford	Matt Saracen	Main	Main	Main	Recurring	Recurring
Minka Kelly	Lyla Garrity	Main	Main	Main	Guest	
Adrianne Palicki	Tyra Collette	Main	Main	Main		Guest
Scott Porter	Jason Street	Main	Main	Recurring		Guest
Gaius Charles	Brian "Smash" Williams	Main	Main	Recurring		
Michael B. Jordan	Vince Howard				Main	Main
Jurnee Smollett	Jess Merriweather				Main	Main
Matt Lauria	Luke Cafferty				Main	Main
Madison Burge	Becky Sproles				Recurring	Main
Grey Damon	Hastings Ruckle					Main

== Main characters ==
- Eric Taylor (Kyle Chandler) — The varsity football coach of the Dillon Panthers, a character inspired by real-life coach Gary Gaines. Initially, Taylor struggles to adjust to the fervent football culture in Dillon. He faces conflicting advice from local supporters. At the end of Season 1, after leading the team to the state tournament, he accepts a higher-level coaching job at a Texas college but returns to Dillon early in Season 2. By the end of Season 3, political maneuvers lead to his job loss, prompting a move to the underfunded East Dillon High as the head coach of its disbanded football team, the East Dillon Lions. Taylor rebuilds the football program there, leading the team to a State Championship before relocating to Philadelphia in support of his wife, Tami.
- Tami Taylor (Connie Britton) — The wife of Eric Taylor and mother of Julie Taylor. She starts as the guidance counselor at Dillon High School, gives birth to her second daughter, Gracie Belle, in Season 2, and becomes the principal in Season 3. She remains at Dillon High after her husband moves to East Dillon in Season 4. Following an incident involving an abortion, Tami resigns as principal and plans to become the guidance counselor at East Dillon. In Season 5, she accepts a position as Dean of Admissions at the fictional Braemore College in Philadelphia.
- Julie Taylor (Aimee Teegarden) — The eldest daughter of Eric and Tami Taylor, she begins as a freshman at Dillon High School and becomes the girlfriend of Matt Saracen. Despite an interview at Boston College, Julie stays in Dillon. By the Season 4 finale, she and Matt break up, but they reconnect in Season 5 when she visits him in Chicago. Eventually, Matt proposes to Julie, who happily accepts, and they are seen living together in Chicago in the series finale.
- Matt Saracen (Zach Gilford) — The Dillon Panthers' quarterback and later wide receiver, struggles with abandonment issues. His mother left when he was young, and his father is often absent due to military service. Saracen is based on Mike Winchell. He graduates at the end of Season 3 but stays in Dillon until moving to Chicago in Season 4 to pursue a career in art. He wore the number 7 jersey, which Tim Riggins frequently refers to him by.
- Tim Riggins (Taylor Kitsch) — The Panthers' fullback/running back, is a troubled character based on Don Billingsley. Known for his heavy drinking and womanizing, he has tumultuous relationships with Lyla Garrity and Tyra Collette. In the Season 4 finale, Riggins takes the fall for an illegal chop shop operation to protect his brother. As a Dillon Panther, he wore the number 33.
- Landry Clarke (Jesse Plemons) – A nerdy freshman, he is the best friend of Matt Saracen and eventually joins the football team in Season 2 as a slot receiver and backup tight end. He forms a band and falls in love with Tyra Collette. Landry, based on Brian Chavez, also exhibits traits of Jerrod McDougal. In Season 4, he becomes a key player for the East Dillon Lions, making the winning field goal against the Panthers in the season finale. Landry goes to Rice University in Houston in Season 5. As a Dillon Panther he wore the number 85, and as an East Dillon Lion he wore the number 21.
- Tyra Collette (Adrianne Palicki) — A former 'bad girl' at Dillon High, she grows into a more responsible and studious young woman under Tami Taylor's mentorship. She dates Tim, Landry and cowboy named Cash. Aspiring to break free from stereotypes, Tyra is accepted into the University of Texas and expresses a desire to enter politics by the series finale.
- Jason Street (Scott Porter) — Once the star quarterback of the Panthers, he becomes paralyzed from the chest down in the first episode. He takes an interest in quad rugby and briefly serves as an assistant coach for the Panthers. He eventually moves to New Jersey to be around his newborn son and baby mama, whom he eventually marries, and manages to become a sports agent. Street's jersey number was 6.
- Lyla Garrity (Minka Kelly) — Daughter of Buddy Garrity, Jason Street's initial girlfriend and former cheerleader captain, she struggles with her relationship with Jason following his accident before eventually breaking up. She turns to religion after her parents' divorce and later dates Tim Riggins. Lyla leaves for Vanderbilt University at the end of Season 3 but returns for a brief appearance in Season 4.
- Brian "Smash" Williams (Gaius Charles) — Brian "Smash" Williams, the Panthers' former running back, he aims for an NFL career to support his family. His character is based on Boobie Miles. Smash faces challenges, including a steroid scandal and a racial altercation. Injured between Seasons 2 and 3, he ultimately joins Texas A&M University with Coach Taylor's support. As a Dillon Panther he wore the number 20.
- Luke Cafferty (Matt Lauria) – Introduced in Season 4 as a replacement for Tim Riggins at tailback of the Panthers. Initially a standout on West Dillon High's junior varsity team, Luke is transferred to East Dillon High after it's discovered he falsified his address to play for West Dillon. Unlike other parents, his are unsupportive of his football pursuits. He impregnates Becky Sproles in Season 4 during a one-night-stand, but they eventually fall in love and develop a strong relationship. In Season 5, Luke struggles with whether to attend a Division III college for football after not receiving offers from larger schools. Advised by Tim Riggins, he focuses on winning the state championship, which his team goal. Eight months later, Luke enlists in the Army. He wore number 4 as a Dillon Panther and number 44 as an East Dillon Lion, earning the nickname "Fours" from Tim Riggins.
- Vince Howard (Michael B. Jordan) – Introduced in Season 4, he is a talented athlete with no previous football experience who joins the East Dillon football team to avoid juvenile detention. After helping his mother enter drug rehab, Vince becomes the team's quarterback, leading them to victory against the Panthers in the Season 4 finale. He also starts a relationship with Jess Merriweather. In Season 5, Vince faces challenges with the attention from colleges and becomes arrogant. His father, who is often present at games, pressures him about college choices, causing tension. Coach Taylor benches Vince due to his behavior, affecting the team morale. Vince eventually matures and leads the Lions to the state championship. Initially involved with a troubled crowd, Vince supports his mother and stands up to his father. Eight months later, he becomes the new quarterback of the Dillon Panthers after the Lions are disbanded. Vince wore the number 5 jersey for the East Dillon Lions.
- Jess Merriweather (Jurnee Smollett) – She is introduced in Season 4 as an East Dillon student. Her father, a former state-championship-winning quarterback for the East Dillon Lions, grew to resent the sport and the team. Jess works at her family's restaurant and takes care of her three younger brothers. By the end of Season 4, she begins a relationship with Vince Howard after briefly dating Landry. In Season 5, Jess realizes she wants to become a coach and starts shadowing Coach Taylor. Her relationship with Vince faces challenges due to his increasingly arrogant behavior, but they reconcile before the Lions go to the state championship when he recognizes his mistakes. Later, Jess informs Coach Taylor that she is moving to Dallas due to her father's business success, and Coach Taylor offers to recommend her to a coach in Dallas. Eight months later, she is shown to be part of the coaching staff of a football team in Dallas.
- Becky Sproles (Madison Burge) – She is an East Dillon student and aspiring beauty queen. In Season 4, she has a one-night-stand with Luke Cafferty which gets her pregnant. She eventually decides to undergo an abortion, receiving support from Tim Riggins. This decision causes controversy for Tami Taylor, eventually leading to her resignation from principal of West Dillon High. In Season 5, Becky and Luke grow closer and fall in love for real, starting a relationship. She also moves in with Billy Riggins and his wife Mindy after her mother leaves and she faces mistreatment from her stepmother. By the series finale, Becky moves back with her mother but promises to stay in touch with Billy and Mindy. Becky is notable for being the only main character who was initially a recurring character before being promoted.
- Hastings Ruckle (Grey Damon) – He is introduced in Season 5 when Buddy Garrity, Eric Taylor, Luke Cafferty, and Vince Howard convince him to join the East Dillon football team instead of the basketball team. He becomes a talented receiver and contributes to the team's state championship victory. It remains unclear whether he joins the Dillon Panthers "super team" after the Lions are disbanded in the series finale or returns to playing basketball for East Dillon. As an East Dillon Lion, he wore the number 88.

== Recurring characters ==
=== Introduced in Season 1 ===
- Buddy Garrity (Brad Leland) – Owner of a popular Chevrolet dealership in Dillon and an influential alumnus and booster club. He has three children, Lyla, Tabby, and Buddy Jr., with his ex-wife Pam. A former college football player for the Texas Longhorns. Buddy's loud and pragmatic demeanor initially causes friction with Coach Taylor, though they eventually develop a cooperative relationship. Buddy's affair with Angela Collette leads to a contentious divorce. In the third season, disillusioned by Joe McCoy's takeover of the Panthers, Buddy shifts his allegiance to the East Dillon Lions, where he significantly contributes by securing sponsorships and hosting a pro-Lions radio show. Later, he sells his dealership and opens a bar in East Dillon. His ex-wife sends their son, Buddy Jr., to live with him after behavioral issues arise. Ultimately, when the Dillon Independent School District consolidates the football teams, Buddy returns to the Panthers as the booster club president. The series finale shows him embracing his role with the Panthers, symbolized by his placement of a sign in the coach's office that reads "Clear Eyes. Full Hearts. Can't Lose." honoring Coach Taylor.
- Buddy Garrity Jr. (Jeff Rosick and Joey Truty) – son of Buddy Garrity and the younger brother of Lyla Garrity. Initially depicted as a young child, Buddy Jr. begins acting out and showing disrespect for authority after moving to California. Consequently, his mother sends him back to Texas to live with his father. To help him straighten out, Buddy Jr. joins the East Dillon Lions football team, where he wears the number 42. However, an injury sidelines him for much of the season. Eventually, he becomes part of the consolidated Dillon super-team.
- Tabby Garrity (Kate Krause) – daughter of Buddy Garrity and the sister of Lyla Garrity and Buddy Garrity Jr. Initially presented as a young child, Tabby moves to California with her mother and stepfather following her parents' divorce. She returns to Dillon in Season 3 to visit her father and sister, though she initially struggles to show respect towards her father. After this visit, Tabby does not appear again in the series.
- Pam Garrity (Merrilee McCommas) – wife of Buddy Garrity, and the mother of Lyla, Buddy Jr., and Tabby. She divorces Buddy in Season 1 after discovering his affair with Angela Collette. In Season 2, Pam remarries a man named Kevin, and between Seasons 2 and 3, they relocate to California with Buddy Jr. and Tabby. In Season 5, due to Buddy Jr.'s behavioral issues, Pam sends him back to Dillon to live with Buddy
- Billy Riggins (Derek Phillips) — Older brother and legal guardian of Tim Riggins, assuming this role due to the absence of their parents. Initially poised to attend college on a golf scholarship, Billy sacrifices this opportunity to care for Tim. Like his brother, he played for the Dillon Panthers. Billy marries Mindy Collette, the older sister of Tim's ex-girlfriend Tyra, at the end of Season 3. He starts a car repair business named Riggins Rigs. Facing financial pressure, especially with Mindy's pregnancy, Billy opens a chop shop in Season 4. When Tim takes the blame for the illegal operation, Billy becomes a coach at East Dillon and supports Becky Sproles during Tim's incarceration. In Season 5, Billy and Mindy learn they are expecting twins. In the series finale, Billy is depicted as a coach for the newly consolidated Dillon Panthers super-team.
- Walt Riggins (Brett Cullen) – Father of Tim and Billy Riggins. He abandoned the family just as Billy was about to attend college. In Season 1, Tim seeks him out for a signature on a document, and Walt appears to attempt a reconciliation. Despite Tim's efforts to reconnect, Walt's true nature is revealed when he steals a camera used to record football games, affirming Billy's warnings about their father.
- Lorraine Saracen (Louanne Stephens) — Grandmother to Matt Saracen and requires special care due to her dementia. Acting as a motherly figure, she has been a primary caregiver in Matt's life since his father is often absent. Her condition necessitates significant responsibility from Matt, impacting his personal life and decisions.
- Henry Saracen (Brent Smiga) – The father of Matt Saracen, divorced Matt's mother when Matt was young and enlisted in the US Army, serving in Iraq. His prolonged absences left Matt without a father figure, leading him to seek guidance from Coach Taylor and his friend Landry. The strained father-son relationship culminates in Henry's death from an IED in Iraq, explored in the emotionally charged episode "The Son," where Matt grapples with his feelings of anger and loss, ultimately acknowledging his father's service to the country at the funeral.
- Corrina Williams (Liz Mikel) — Mother of Brian "Smash" Williams. She works as a nurse and plays a crucial role in her son's life, balancing her support for his football dreams with a strong emphasis on education. She discovers steroids in Smash's room and informs Coach Taylor, momentarily jeopardizing his career. Corrina also informs Tami Taylor of her pregnancy at the end of Season 1. She and her daughters exit the series after Smash leaves for college.
- Sheila & Noannie Williams (Whitney MCCauley & Nieko Mann) – Older and younger sisters of Smash Williams, respectively. Their roles in the series are minor, with their family dynamics and interactions primarily supporting Smash's storyline.
- Waverly Grady (Aasha Davis) — The preacher's daughter, is a former girlfriend of Smash Williams. Their relationship ends due to the challenges posed by Waverly's bipolar disorder.
- Reverend Grady (Sid Johnson) – A preacher in town and Waverly's father, contributing to the portrayal of Waverly's family and social environment.
- Mitchell and Joanne Street (Mark Nutter and Katherine Willis) — Jason Street's parents. Their professions are not specified. Following Jason's injury, they mortgage their house to cover medical expenses and home renovations, leading them to sue Coach Taylor for compensation. This decision creates household tension, as Jason views Taylor as a mentor and is close to his parents. The Streets, depicted as an "All-American" family, are dedicated to Jason, their presumed only child, and regularly supported him at football games. After Jason moves to New York City in Season 3, they are no longer mentioned.
- Herc (Kevin Rankin) — Athlete who shares the same spinal cord injury as Jason Street. They meet as roommates in the rehab center, where Herc mentors Jason and introduces him to quad rugby. They later become roommates and collaborate on a real estate venture before Jason departs for the northeast.
- Angela Collette (Dana Wheeler-Nicholson) — Mother of Tyra Collette and former mistress to Buddy Garrity. Her affair with Buddy contributes to the breakdown of his family life, revealing his repeated infidelities to Lyla's mother over the years.
- Mindy Collette-Riggins (Stacey Oristano) – Tyra Collette's hard-edged sister and Billy Riggins's wife. She works as a stripper at The Landing Strip and, unlike Tyra, embraces a "trashy" image. Initially a minor character, Mindy's role expands in the final two seasons, revealing her empathetic nature. She acts as a sister figure to Becky, has a son named Stevie with Billy, and is expecting twins in Season 5.
- Mac MacGill (Blue Deckert) — Offensive coordinator for the Dillon Panthers. Initially tense with Eric Taylor due to his expectation of becoming head coach, Mac makes controversial comments leading to a team walkout in Season 1. He later defends Smash Williams during a brawl incident. After a heart attack in Season 3, Mac takes a leave and is replaced by Wade Aikmen. He declines a job offer from Coach Taylor at East Dillon in Season 4. By Season 5, Mac becomes the head coach of the Dillon Panthers, but his status after the football season is uncertain. It could be possible he retired from coaching.
- Coach T.C. Crowley (Timothy Crowley) – Assistant coach for the Dillon Panthers from Seasons 1-4. He joins Coach Taylor at East Dillon, becoming his right-hand man. A disagreement over player conduct briefly puts him at odds with Taylor and Coach Riggins. Crowley returns to the Dillon Panthers "super team" in the series finale after the East Dillon football program shuts down.
- Coach Spivey (Aaron Spivey-Sorrells) – Assistant coach for the Dillon Panthers who joins the East Dillon Lions in Season 5. Known for his motivational skills, he returns to the Panthers "super team" in the series finale following the closure of the East Dillon football program.
- Bobby "Bull" Reyes (Walter Perez) – An outside linebacker for the Dillon Panthers, appearing early in Season 1. He participates in vandalizing a rival quarterback's car and later assaults Kurt Kaster. Initially claiming racism as the motive, Reyes admits the truth to Coach Taylor, who then removes him from the team. Reyes is not seen or mentioned after this incident. As a Panther, he wore number 40.
- Bradley Cole (James Powers) - A defensive end for the Dillon Panthers, characterized by his quiet demeanor and background presence. In "Full Hearts," he is involved in a confrontation with Tim Riggins following rumors of Tim's affair with Lyla, spurred by misinformation about Tim's altercation with Jason Street. Cole later facilitates Matt and Julie's use of his family's lake house for a significant moment. Tim's return to the team prompts Cole to receive Riggins's apology in "Seeing Other People." He appears throughout Seasons 1 and 2 but is absent from Season 3 onwards, presumably due to graduation. As a Dillon Panther he wore either the number 56 in Season 1 and the number 55 in Season 2.
- Ray “Voodoo” Tatum (Aldis Hodge) — A Louisiana resident brought to Dillon by Buddy Garrity to temporarily replace Matt Saracen as the Panther quarterback after Hurricane Katrina displaced him. Despite initial success, his refusal to bond with teammates and insubordination lead to his expulsion from the team during halftime of a crucial game. The Panthers subsequently forfeit a game he led them to win. Tatum reappears as the quarterback for West Cambria in the State Final against the Panthers at the end of Season 1, attempting to provoke Smash Williams. As a Panther and later a Mustang, he wears number 9.
- Jackie Miller (Brooke Langton) – Single mother to Bo Miller who moves in next door to the Riggins brothers with her son, Bo. She becomes romantically involved with both Tim and Billy Riggins, causing tension between the brothers in Season 2. Jackie leaves the series after her breakup with Billy.
- Bo Miller (Jae Head) – Jackie's son and an admirer of Tim Riggins. After being bullied, Tim teaches him self-defense, strengthening their bond. Tim gives Jackie tickets for the state final, ostensibly for Bo.
- Suzy (Alexandra Holden) – A tattoo artist who briefly engages in a flirtation with Jason Street, witnessed by Lyla, causing strain in their relationship.
- Kurt Kaster (Brent McGregor) – A longtime friend of Matt and Landry who is hospitalized after being assaulted by Bobby Reyes following a disagreement about football. Landry's reluctance to intervene strains his friendship with Matt.
- Mayor Lucy Rodell (Libby Villari) – staunch supporter of the Dillon Panthers, playing a prominent role in local politics and events.
- Slammin' Sammy Meade (David Cowgill) – serves as the commentator for football games in Dillon, providing colorful commentary and analysis.
- Lois (Megan Moser) – A friend of Julie Taylor, initially preferred by Tami over Tyra Collette.

=== Introduced in Season 2 ===
- Gracie Belle Taylor (Madilyn Landry) – Younger Daughter of Eric and Tami Taylor
- Bill McGregor (Chris Mulkey) — Former head coach of the Dillon Panthers. He replaced Coach Taylor at the beginning of season 2 after the latter left for TMU. Known as the "Tennessee Tyrant" for his militant style of coaching, in contrast to Taylor's more casual style.
- Chad Clarke (Glenn Morshower) — Father of Landry Clarke, Dillon Panthers alumnus, and police sergeant for the Dillon Police Department. He tries to protect Landry when he gets into trouble in Season 2.
- Mary Clarke (Carol Farabee) – Mother of Landry Clarke.
- Santiago Herrera (Benny Ciaramello) — upon his release from juvenile detention. Despite his troubled past, Santiago demonstrates academic prowess, which is noted by then-guidance counselor Tami Taylor. Buddy Garrity extends a helping hand by offering Santiago employment and accommodation, leading to the development of a paternal bond between the two. Santiago's athletic talents are recognized when he joins the football team, excelling as a standout defensive player, notably wearing the number 59 as a Dillon Panther. However, due to the disruption caused by a writers' strike, Santiago's storyline is abruptly abandoned in the subsequent season, resulting in the character's disappearance from the series altogether.
- Carlotta Alonso (Daniella Alonso) – introduced as a live-in nurse enlisted to assist Matt and Lorraine during Lorraine's declining mental health. Despite Matt's existing relationship, he develops romantic feelings for Carlotta. Eventually, he ends his relationship to pursue one with Carlotta, who initially resists but later reciprocates his affections. Their relationship progresses to a physical level, resulting in Carlotta taking Matt's virginity. However, their romance is short-lived as Carlotta decides to return to her family in Guatemala, prompting the end of their relationship.
- Shelley Hayes (Jessalyn Gilsig) – Tami Taylor's sister, portrayed as immature, arrives to assist after Gracie's birth. Her actions prompt Julie to reflect on her own behavior. Subsequently, she transitions into a career as a real estate agent.
- Noelle Davenport (Jana Kramer) – The sister of a former Panther player, who had graduated two years before Season 2, enters a relationship with Smash during this season. Their interracial relationship faces disapproval from both sets of parents. Alongside Smash's sister Noannie, they encounter harassment from teenagers during a movie outing, which leads to Smash defending their honor. As a consequence, Smash receives a three-game suspension.
- Chris Kennedy (Matt Czuchry) – A Christian youth leader, who is also a DJ on a Christian radio station, meets Lyla when she joins their group in Season 2. Their relationship develops into a romantic one, despite Tim Riggins' unwanted attention towards Lyla. However, in Season 3, the character is absent from the storyline due to Lyla's relationship with Tim, which takes precedence in the narrative.
- Erin Street (Tamara Jolaine) – A waitress encounters Jason after a failed blind date and ends up sleeping with him, resulting in her pregnancy. Despite initial plans for abortion due to her young age, Jason, realizing the unlikelihood of conception due to his paraplegia-related fertility issues, urges her to keep the child. In Season 3, she gives birth to their son, Noah, and maintains a relationship with Jason, although they do not reside together. Eventually, she relocates to New Jersey with Noah to live with her parents, prompting Jason to pursue a job in New York. After securing an entry-level position at a sports agency, Jason commits to supporting her and their child. By Season 5, Jason reveals that they are married, and she expresses a desire to expand their family.
- Isabella (Kathleen Hays) - A woman who Jason is set up on a blind date with, but abandons after finding she has odd sexual preferences, having Erin tell her he has left.
- Glenn Reed (Steven Walters) – A teacher at Dillon High School develops a friendship with Tami Taylor upon her return from maternity leave. In Season 4, he kisses Tami while intoxicated during a happy hour event. Overcome with guilt, he confesses the incident to Tami's husband, Eric, feeling ashamed of his actions.
- Anton "The Swede" (Alejandro Rose-Garcia, later known as the musician Shakey Graves) – A lifeguard stationed at the pool where Julie works catches her attention at the outset of Season 2. Julie becomes romantically interested in him. Following the birth of Gracie Belle and amidst the challenges of her home life, Julie decides to end her relationship with Matt and pursue a connection with "The Swede." However, Julie discovers, as warned by Tami, that "The Swede" is not interested in a committed relationship and leads a carefree lifestyle, causing her distress.
- Noah Barnett (Austin Nichols) – A young teacher joins Dillon High School in Season 2, where Julie forms a friendship with him after learning about the reality of her relationship with "The Swede." Tami misinterprets their rapport as a romantic interest and confronts the teacher, leading to strained relations between Tami and Julie.
- Guy Raston (Joey Oglesby) – Tim Riggins seeks refuge with a methamphetamine dealer after departing his home and being ousted from Tyra's residence. The dealer permits Tim to stay provided he tends to his ferrets. Upon awakening to the dealer wielding a firearm, Tim opts to leave. Later, Tim pilfers funds from the dealer to settle his mortgage, leading to confrontation. Despite repayment facilitated by Lyla, tensions persist, resulting in a strained relationship. In Season 3, Billy endeavors to vend stolen copper wire to the dealer, but encounters obstacles.
- Jean Binnel (Brea Grant) – In Season 2, Landry embarks on a brief relationship with a girl who becomes aware of his complex dynamics with Tyra. Sensing the tension, she confronts Landry, insisting that he make a choice between her and Tyra. Ultimately, Landry decides to pursue a romantic relationship with Tyra, opting to end things with the other girl.
- Lauren Davis (Kim Smith) – Following his split from Julie, Matt briefly enters into a relationship with a cheerleader. However, his feelings for Carlotta develop, prompting him to seek advice from Smash on how to navigate the breakup. Smash suggests proposing an open relationship, which Matt follows through with. As a result, the cheerleader, named Lauren, ends their relationship.
- Adam Hughes (Garrett Graham) - A boy who makes racist comments about Noelle and Noannie, resulting in Smash beating him up and being punished legally for it.
- Roberta "Bobbie" Roberts (Alanna Ubach) – The coach of the girls' soccer team at Dillon High School is known for her persistent requests for equipment when Taylor assumes the role of athletic director. She consistently seeks resources to support the team's needs.
- Morris "Mo" McArnold (Peter Berg) – Mo, Tami's former high school sweetheart, who she left to be with Eric, returns to Dillon as a real estate developer aiming to purchase shopping centers. Despite the passage of time, Mo remains attracted to Tami. Tensions escalate when Mo accuses Eric of "stealing" Tami from him, sparking a confrontation between the two men. Eric's jealousy over Mo's lingering feelings for Tami exacerbates the conflict, leading to a heated altercation between them.
- Kevin Turner (Taylor Nichols) - Pam's partner, later husband, following her divorce from Buddy, is named Kevin. The family, excluding Lyla, relocates to California between Season 2 and Season 3. Kevin is characterized as a hipster and a vegetarian. His influence leads to Buddy Jr. and Tabby adopting disrespectful behavior towards their father in Season 3. Additionally, Buddy insinuates that the marijuana Pam accuses Buddy Jr. of using originates from Kevin.

=== Introduced in Season 3 ===
- Shelby Saracen (née Garrett) (Kim Dickens) — Mother of Matt Saracen,. Shelby was largely absent from Matt's life until his struggles with his grandmother prompted him to seek her out to sign papers for his legal emancipation. She eventually stays in Dillon with Matt and his grandmother, Lorraine, who takes some time to accept Shelby's help.
- J.D. McCoy (Jeremy Sumpter) — talented quarterback who joins the varsity team as a freshman, eventually replacing Matt Saracen as the starter. His father, Joe McCoy, attempts to bribe Coach Taylor to start J.D. He struggles to relate to older teammates due to his straight-laced habits. In the fourth season, J.D. becomes arrogant as Joe becomes President of the Booster Club and Wade Aikmen becomes head coach. By the fifth season, J.D. is no longer the starting quarterback for the Panthers, having left Dillon after a loss to East Dillon. As a Panther, he wore the number 12. His increasing arrogance makes him the secondary antagonist of Season 4..
- Joe McCoy (D. W. Moffett) – J.D. McCoy's father and a beer distributor. He attempts to bribe Coach Taylor into starting J.D. and is controlling of his son's life, restricting his diet and social interactions. Joe's actions escalate, leading to Coach Taylor's replacement by Wade Aikmen. In Season 4, as head of the booster club, Joe antagonizes Tami Taylor and announces his divorce from Katie. In Season 5, Joe, J.D., and Wade have left Dillon, making Joe the main antagonist of Seasons 3 and 4.
- Katie McCoy (Janine Turner) – J.D. McCoy's mother and Joe's wife. She is less controlling of J.D.'s life and encourages him to focus on activities other than football. In Season 3, she befriends Tami Taylor, but their friendship ends after the Taylors call CPS. By Season 4, Joe announces their impending divorce.
- Wade Aikmen (Drew Waters) – J.D. McCoy's personal coach, hired by Joe McCoy. He temporarily replaces Mac McGill after a heart attack and later becomes head coach of the Panthers, replacing Coach Taylor. By Season 5, Wade, along with Joe and J.D., has left Dillon. It is implied that he was a self-centered coach.
- Jamarcus Hall (Sinqua Walls) – A player introduced in Season 3 who replaces Tim Riggins as fullback. Jamarcus forges his parents' signatures to play football, but his father pulls him from the team, citing a lack of interest in football and a career that requires frequent relocations. With Eric and Tami's persuasion, Jamarcus is given another chance and gains the respect of his teammates. He does not appear in Seasons 4 and 5, possibly due to his family's relocation. As a Panther, he wore the number 1.
- Devin Boland (Stephanie Hunt) – A new student in Season 3 who joins Landry's band. After Landry kisses her, she reveals she is a lesbian, but they maintain their friendship. In Season 4, she attends East Dillon High and becomes friends with Julie. Her parents' divorce is mentioned. Her last name was shown as "Corrigan" in Season 3 credits, possibly due to her parents' divorce.
- Madison Balman (Whitney Hoy) – A girl interested in J.D. McCoy in Season 3. Katie McCoy approves of their relationship, but Joe sees it as a distraction. Initially, J.D. ends their relationship under his father's pressure but later resumes it. In Season 4, Madison is not seen, suggesting they broke up due to J.D.'s increasing arrogance.
- Cash Waller (Zach Roerig) – A cowboy who dates Tyra in Season 3. Initially charming, he is later revealed to have a gambling problem and a temper.
- Paul Dunley (David Born) – The superintendent for Dillon High. He aligns with Tami Taylor's views but acknowledges the need to appease the community for funding.
- Clint Trucks (Brandon Smith) - The vice principal at Dillon High. He discourages Tyra from aiming for certain colleges and disapproves of her campaign. Tami Taylor defends Tyra but agrees with Trucks' opinion.
- Jimmy Adler (Caleb Landry Jones) - The drummer for Landry's band.
- Grant Halbert (Scottie Jefferies) - A former football player for Westerby turned sports agent in New York. He initially seeks information from Jason Street about Wendell Foley, a former teammate who went pro. Impressed by Jason's ability to persuade Wendell to sign with him, Grant helps Jason secure an entry-level position at his firm.
- Wendell Foley (Galen Flemons) - A former Panther who went pro and introduces Jason Street to Grant Halbert. Jason convinces Wendell to sign with Grant, leading to Jason's employment at Grant's firm.

=== Introduced in Season 4 ===
- Levi Burnwell (Troy Hogan) – Introduced in season 4, Levi Burnwell is an alumnus and the principal of East Dillon High. He was formerly a teacher at West Dillon High before East Dillon's reopening. Despite viewing football as a financial burden for East Dillon High, Levi frequently attends games to support the Lions.
- Dallas Tinker (LaMarcus Tinker) – Known by his last name, Tinker is a key player for the East Dillon Lions, part of a core group that includes Vince Howard, Luke Cafferty, Hastings Ruckle, and Buddy Garrity, Jr. He has shown camaraderie, such as helping Luke mend a fence on his parents' farm. In Season 5, he trades his rally girl, Becky, to Luke in exchange for a pig. Tinker eventually joins the Dillon super-team and wears the number 79. His teammates often call him "Tink."
- Coach Stan Traub (Russell DeGrazier) – Assistant coach for the East Dillon Lions during seasons 4 and 5. He is also the manager of a local Sears store and was formerly a standout Pop Warner coach. Stan is known for echoing the words of fellow coaches. By the season finale, his future with football coaching remains uncertain.
- Regina Howard (Angela Rawna) – The mother of Vince Howard, Regina is a former drug addict who, after being helped into rehab by her son, strives to turn her life around.
- Calvin Brown (Ernest James) – A friend of Vince Howard in Season 4. Calvin joins the football team but is expelled by Coach Taylor after refusing to apologize for fighting. He is involved in criminal activities and influences Vince to borrow money from his boss, Kennard. Calvin is later shot and killed by rival neighborhood thugs, prompting Vince to attend his memorial and face pressure to seek revenge. During the brief time that he was an East Dillon Lion, he wore the number 23.
- Kennard Royce (Cedric Neal) – A thug in East Dillon who employs Calvin and Vince, teaching them to steal cars. Kennard loans Vince money to get his mother into rehab, creating a debt Vince must repay. After Calvin's death, Kennard pressures Vince to seek revenge but ultimately spares him, deeming him unworthy. In Season 5, Kennard demands repayment, leading to a confrontation with Vince's father, Ornette.
- Cheryl Sproles (Alicia Witt) – The mother of Becky Sproles and a bartender in West Dillon. She has a brief relationship with Tim Riggins and allows him to rent a trailer on her property. Having had Becky in high school, Cheryl is determined that Becky does not repeat her mistakes. When Becky becomes pregnant, Cheryl insists on an abortion. She later works on a casino boat, leaving Becky in the care of her father and stepmother.
- Bull Sproles (Lee Stringer) – Becky Sproles' father and a truck driver. He visits in Season 4, gets Becky a dog, but is revealed to have another child with another woman. He fights with Tim Riggins over this revelation and leaves. In Season 5, he returns to look after Becky while her mother is away, but struggles with parenting, prompting Becky to live with the Riggins family.
- Virgil "Big Merry" Merriweather (Steve Harris) – Father of Jess Merriweather and her three brothers, Virgil owns and operates Ray's BBQ in East Dillon. A former East Dillon Lions state champion, he initially opposes Coach Taylor's football program but later supports it, offering advice and employment to Vince Howard.
- Bird Merriweather (Lorraine Toussaint) – Jess, Andre, Caleb and Darius' aunt, and Virgil's sister. She manages his restaurant in Season 5 while he is in Dallas on a work trip.
- Andre Merriweather (Charlie Quary) – Jess Merriweather's younger brother, who plays peewee football.
- Caleb Merriweather (Isaac Smith) – Jess Merriweather's younger brother. He plays peewee football.
- Darius Merriweather (Josh Levi) – Jess Merriweather's younger brother, who also plays peewee football.
- Tom Cafferty (Barry Tubb) – Luke Cafferty's father, a cattle rancher. He supports his son through various challenges, including a teenage pregnancy. In Season 5, he is proud of Luke's success on the football field but is initially uneasy about Luke's relationship with Becky.
- Margaret Cafferty (Kathleen Griffith) – Luke Cafferty's mother, who is deeply upset by Becky's decision to have an abortion, blaming Tami Taylor, which contributes to Tami losing her job. Despite this, she and Tom support Luke's football career and relationship with Becky in Season 5.
- Ryan Lowry (Matt Barr) – A partner with "Habitat for Humanity." Julie Taylor briefly dates him in Season 4 after her breakup with Matt Saracen. He leaves for a project in Arizona.
- Coach Granger (John Swasey) - A coach for the East Dillon Lions in Season 4 who quits after a confrontation with Calvin Brown.
- Ken Shaw (Nnamdi Asomugha) - A detective with the East Dillon Police Department. His brother was a player under Coach Taylor. Ken intervenes to keep Vince Howard out of juvenile detention, allowing him to play football instead.
- Elden Crumpler (Lawrence Gilliard Jr.) – A former gangster turned community worker. He assists in improving conditions at Carroll Park and supports Coach Taylor's initiatives.

=== Introduced in Season 5 ===
- Ornette Howard (Cress Williams) – Vince Howard's father, a former drug dealer who returns to Dillon after serving time in prison. Despite initial rejection from Vince, Ornette becomes involved in his life, often clashing with Coach Taylor over Vince's future.
- Doreen Sproles (Heather Kafka) – Becky Sproles' stepmother, who struggles to care for her when Becky's mother is away. Eventually, Becky moves in with the Riggins family due to the tension at home.
- Epyck Sanders (Emily Rios) – A troubled student at East Dillon High living in a foster home. Despite Tami Taylor's efforts to help her, Epyck's behavioral issues lead to her arrest and transfer to another school.
- Maura Friedman (Denise Williamson) – A student at East Dillon High who becomes involved with Vince Howard, leading to a conflict with Jess Merriweather.
- Derek Bishop (Gil McKinney) – Julie Taylor's college history TA with whom she has an affair. When discovered by his wife, Julie returns home to recover from the fallout.
- Laurel Sachs (Lynn Blackburn) - A history teacher at East Dillon High who befriends Tami Taylor. She becomes involved in the incident leading to Epyck Sanders' arrest.
- Bob Short (Akin Babatunde) - Owner of a gardening store in East Dillon who hires Regina Howard, supporting her efforts to rebuild her life.
