= Toilet Bowl (Friday Night Lights) =

- Friday Night Lights episode
- Episode no.: Season 4 Episode 8
- Directed by: Michael Waxman
- Written by: Derek Santos Olson
- Cinematography by: Todd McMullen
- Editing by: Angela M. Catanzaro
- Original release dates: January 6, 2010 (DirecTV); June 25, 2010 (NBC)
- Running time: 43 minutes

Guest appearances
- Brad Leland as Buddy Garrity; Steve Harris as Virgil Merriweather; Madison Burge as Becky Sproles

Episode chronology
← Previous "In the Bag"	Next → "The Lights in Carroll Park"
- Friday Night Lights (season 4)

"Toilet Bowl" is the eighth episode of the fourth season of the American sports drama television series Friday Night Lights, inspired by the 1990 nonfiction book by H. G. Bissinger. It is the 58th overall episode of the series and was written by Derek Santos Olson, and directed by producer Michael Waxman. It originally aired on DirecTV's 101 Network on January 6, 2010, before airing on NBC on June 25, 2010.

The series is set in the fictional town of Dillon, a small, close-knit community in rural West Texas. It follows a high school football team, the Dillon Panthers. It features a set of characters, primarily connected to Coach Eric Taylor, his wife Tami, and their daughter Julie. In the episode, the Lions prepare in facing one of the worst teams in the football season. Meanwhile, Tami and Julie travel to Boston, while Tim tries to find money to buy the open field.

According to Nielsen Media Research, the episode was seen by an estimated 3.54 million household viewers and gained a 1.1/5 ratings share among adults aged 18–49. The episode received positive reviews from critics, who praised the performances and tone, although some criticized the pacing and over-abundance of storylines.

== Plot ==
The Lions will face the Campo Park Timberwolves, which is the other worst performer in the football season, prompting media to call the game "toilet bowl." Tim (Taylor Kitsch) meets with the owner of the open field, who states that the price is $85,000, and it could be $75,000 if he pays half the purchasing price upfront.

Landry (Jesse Plemons) tries to get Jess (Jurnee Smollett) to go on a date with him, as she does not want to call it a "date". She also tries to avoid Vince (Michael B. Jordan), thinking that, even though she clearly feels something for him, it could never work between them. While helping Mindy (Stacey Oristano), Tim discovers that Billy (Derek Phillips) has been ignoring her calls, and she suspects he may have an affair. Tim confronts Billy at the shop, only to discover that Billy is working with one of Vince's criminal friends to help him use the shop to break down stolen cars for money. Tim also tries to help Luke (Matt Lauria), whose injury may impact his practice. Tim gets him to see a specific doctor to give him better medication.

Tami (Connie Britton) and Julie (Aimee Teegarden) leave for Boston to find possible colleges for Julie. While Tami is excited over her prospects, Julie is not exactly enthralled with the experience. During a discussion, Julie finally expresses that she feels lost after her break-up with Matt, and Tami comforts her before her interview with a Boston College representative. Julie successfully completes the interview, although Tami tells her she is proud of her no matter her decision.

During the game, the Lions impress by winning during the second half. As they approach the final seconds, the Timberwolves make a comeback and start leading the game. Despite his injury, Luke manages to score a touchdown. This allows the Lions to win 23-21, marking their first win of the season. After the game, Jess decides to go out with Landry to make Vince jealous. Tim takes Becky (Madison Burge) to see the open field, where the two share a kiss. Then, Tim visits Billy, asking to be involved in his scheme, as he could get the money needed for the field in just a couple of months.

== Production ==
=== Development ===
The episode was written by Derek Santos Olson, and directed by producer Michael Waxman. This was Olson's first writing credit, and Waxman's sixth directing credit.

== Reception ==
=== Viewers ===
In its original American broadcast on NBC, "Toilet Bowl" was seen by an estimated 3.54 million household viewers with a 1.1/5 in the 18–49 demographics. This means that 1.1 percent of all households with televisions watched the episode, while 5 percent of all of those watching television at the time of the broadcast watched it. This was a slight increase in viewership from the previous episode, which was watched by an estimated 3.43 million household viewers with a 1.0/4 in the 18–49 demographics.

=== Critical reviews ===
"Toilet Bowl" received positive reviews from critics. Keith Phipps of The A.V. Club gave the episode a "B" grade and wrote, "Still, for an episode that set up the back-half of the season, I can't say I'm terribly excited — yet — about where the season's headed. There were some really fine moments here, however, like that funny opening as Tami and Julie prepare for the trip and Buddy's mission to get the East Dillon game broadcast on a station with little use for English, much less fútbol de Norteamericano."

Ken Tucker of Entertainment Weekly wrote, "Friday Night Lights has now reached the point where its new characters have earned equal footing with fan favorites such as Tim Riggins and Landry. And it's about time, since I think we're about half-way through the season, aren't we?"

Alan Sepinwall wrote, "Friday Night Lights doesn't need to audition for me to get it to watch the rest of this season or all of next. It already nailed the job, way back in the pilot episode. I just want it to be working as well as it can going into the home stretch." Allison Waldman of TV Squad wrote, "I'd like to see Becky save Tim. I'd like to see Tim get the $85,000 for the 25 acres. I'd like to see a happy ending for Tim, but I don't know how that's going to happen."

Andy Greenwald of Vulture wrote, "This episode wasn't really a 'corker,' per se. Merely another quality brick in what is shaping up to be an outstanding season." Television Without Pity gave the episode an "A" grade.
