= East of Dillon =

- Friday Night Lights episode
- Episode no.: Season 4 Episode 1
- Directed by: Peter Berg
- Written by: Jason Katims
- Cinematography by: Todd McMullen
- Editing by: Ron Rosen
- Original release dates: October 28, 2009 (DirecTV); May 7, 2010 (NBC)
- Running time: 43 minutes

Guest appearances
- Zach Gilford as Matt Saracen; Alicia Witt as Cheryl Sproles; Brad Leland as Buddy Garrity; D. W. Moffett as Joe McCoy; Jeremy Sumpter as J.D. McCoy; Madison Burge as Becky Sproles

Episode chronology
← Previous "Tomorrow Blues"	Next → "After the Fall"
- Friday Night Lights (season 4)

"East of Dillon" is the first episode of the fourth season of the American sports drama television series Friday Night Lights, inspired by the 1990 nonfiction book by H. G. Bissinger. It is the 51st overall episode of the series and was written by executive producer Jason Katims, and directed by series developer Peter Berg. It originally aired on DirecTV's 101 Network on October 28, 2009, before airing on NBC on May 7, 2010.

The series is set in the fictional town of Dillon, a small, close-knit community in rural West Texas. It follows a high school football team, the Dillon Panthers. It features a set of characters, primarily connected to Coach Eric Taylor, his wife Tami, and their daughter Julie. In the episode, Eric adjusts to his new job at East Dillon, while Tim and Matt struggle in their new lives.

According to Nielsen Media Research, the episode was seen by an estimated 3.90 million household viewers and gained a 1.2/5 ratings share among adults aged 18–49. The episode received critical acclaim, with critics praising Kyle Chandler's performance, writing and new storylines. For his performance, Kyle Chandler received a nomination for Outstanding Lead Actor in a Drama Series at the 62nd Primetime Emmy Awards.

== Plot ==
Eric (Kyle Chandler) starts his tenure as head coach for the East Dillon Lions football team, although the field house proves to be in shambles. Landry (Jesse Plemons) joins the team after he is informed that he will have to attend East Dillon. Eric is unimpressed by the team's performance, and asks them to re-evaluate their place. Later, he is visited by an old friend, now working as a cop. He brings over Vince Howard (Michael B. Jordan), a teenager who has been arrested multiple times. He asks him to help Vince in his life, or he will be sent to juvie.

Three weeks later, Tami (Connie Britton) faces controversy due to the redistricting plans. Matt (Zach Gilford) has chosen not to go to the School of the Art Institute of Chicago, instead going to the Dillon Tech community college and working as a pizza delivery man. At a party, Matt gets into a fight with J.D. (Jeremy Sumpter) when he harasses Julie (Aimee Teegarden). Tim (Taylor Kitsch) decides to drop out of San Antonio State and moves back in with Billy (Derek Phillips) and Mindy (Stacey Oristano). However, Billy is angry at Tim's decision, as his presence will impact his life with Mindy and their incoming child.

While buying equipment at Sears, Eric meets Stan Traub (Russell DeGrazier), a former coach who has been trying to contact him about a possible job offer and decides to hire him as an assistant coach for East Dillon. Tensions arise when Landry and another player get into a fight when the latter insults Eric. When the player refuses to apologize, Eric kicks him out of the team and tells those who do not want to be part of the team to leave. This causes 18 players to walk out, concerning Stan. Tim has a one-night stand with a woman named Cheryl Sproles (Alicia Witt). Tim meets her daughter Becky (Madison Burge) and tries to give her a ride to school but his truck breaks down.

On Friday, Julie tells her parents that she has decided to move to East Dillon High, upsetting Tami. Both Dillon teams play on the same night with different scenarios; the Panthers easily win their game, while the Lions have an awful performance and the poor equipment results in many injured players by halftime. Seeing the players' weak state, Eric informs the referee that they will forfeit the game, ending with a 45-0 loss for East Dillon. Eric walks back to the locker room as locals jeer at him for his decision.

== Production ==
=== Development ===
The episode was written by executive producer Jason Katims, and directed by series developer Peter Berg. This was Katims' eighth writing credit, and Berg's second directing credit.

== Reception ==
=== Viewers ===
In its original American broadcast on NBC, "East of Dillon" was seen by an estimated 3.90 million household viewers with a 1.2/5 in the 18–49 demographics. This means that 1.2 percent of all households with televisions watched the episode, while 5 percent of all of those watching television at the time of the broadcast watched it. This was a 11% decrease in viewership from the previous episode, which was watched by an estimated 4.36 million household viewers with a 1.3/4 in the 18–49 demographics.

=== Critical reviews ===
"East of Dillon" received critical acclaim. Eric Goldman of IGN gave the episode a "great" 8.8 out of 10 and wrote, "Once again, I marvel at the fact that I even still have the privilege of writing about Friday Night Lights. Seriously, this show has defied the odds to a spectacular extent, and the fact that it is now in Season 4 (with Season 5 already ordered) is just awesome. And as usual, this show is awesome as well."

Keith Phipps of The A.V. Club gave the episode an "A–" grade and wrote, "Will this team even be in shape to play a game in next week's episode? We're entering a season where that's not even a given, and it’s an exciting place to be." Ken Tucker of Entertainment Weekly wrote, "For FNL fans, the most rewarding scenes, as directed with crisp briskness by Peter Berg, were those that caught us up with key characters."

Alan Sepinwall wrote, "While characters like Eric, Tim and Landry are all struggling to walk into situations they think are familiar, but really aren't, 'East of Dillon' felt very familiar in a good way. The colors of the uniforms have changed, as have some of the faces, but this is still the show we know and love so well." Jonathan Toomey of TV Squad wrote, "The real beauty of Friday Night Lights has always been its authenticity, especially when it comes to handling a character's departure to make way for fresh blood. No one stays around forever and Dillon High doesn't have one of those nine year programs so often seen on TV shows. As a result, dramatic moments are just that - dramatic - and not cheesy. The show has always done a great job at capturing the heartache that comes with saying goodbye."

Andy Greenwald of Vulture wrote, "All in all, a rip-roaring start to a new season of a consistently brilliant show, one that feels both familiar and completely new. Building a school (and a football team) from scratch is a bold play for the series, but it seems like the right move, assuming they’ve cast all the new characters as well as they have Vince." Matt Richenthal of TV Fanatic wrote, "Foremost, following this week's episode, is Vince. A troubled, quiet youth, he clearly seeks discipline and a father figure. Will Eric provide that for him? So far, so good."

Todd Martens of Los Angeles Times wrote, "Losing, on field and off, is embraced in the season premiere. The Lions are bad, so bad they forfeit a game for the safety of their players. Heck, as for rock bottom, Taylor's Lions are still looking up at it. But if the Season 4 premiere is any indication, rooting for the underdogs won't be difficult at all." Television Without Pity gave the episode an "A" grade.

=== Accolades ===
Kyle Chandler submitted the episode to support his nomination for Outstanding Lead Actor in a Drama Series at the 62nd Primetime Emmy Awards. Peter Berg also submitted this episode for consideration for Outstanding Directing for a Drama Series.
