= Thanksgiving (Friday Night Lights) =

- Friday Night Lights episode
- Episode no.: Season 4 Episode 13
- Directed by: Michael Waxman
- Written by: Jason Katims
- Cinematography by: Todd McMullen
- Editing by: Ron Rosen; Stephen Michael
- Original release dates: February 10, 2010 (DirecTV); August 6, 2010 (NBC)
- Running time: 45 minutes

Guest appearances
- Zach Gilford as Matt Saracen; Brad Leland as Buddy Garrity; D. W. Moffett as Joe McCoy; Dana Wheeler-Nicholson as Angela Collette; Jeremy Sumpter as J.D. McCoy; Barry Tubb as Tom Cafferty; Madison Burge as Becky Sproles

Episode chronology
← Previous "Laboring"	Next → "Expectations"
- Friday Night Lights (season 4)

"Thanksgiving" is the thirteenth episode and season finale of the fourth season of the American sports drama television series Friday Night Lights, inspired by the 1990 nonfiction book by H. G. Bissinger. It is the 63rd overall episode of the series and was written by executive producer Jason Katims, and directed by producer Michael Waxman. It originally aired on DirecTV's 101 Network on February 10, 2010, before airing on NBC on August 6, 2010.

The series is set in the fictional town of Dillon, a small, close-knit community in rural West Texas. The fourth season follows a high school football team, the underfunded and poorly supported East Dillon Lions. It features a set of characters, primarily connected to Coach Eric Taylor, his wife Tami, and their daughter Julie. In the episode, Taylor's Lions and his former team, the Dillion Panthers face off in a decisive game. Meanwhile, Tami's career hangs in the balance, while Tim and Billy face possible jail time for the stolen cars.

According to Nielsen Media Research, the episode was seen by an estimated 3.56 million household viewers and gained a 1.1/5 ratings share among adults aged 18–49. The episode received critical acclaim, with critics praising the performances, writing, character development and tone.

== Plot ==
The Lions and the Panthers prepare for their game, attracting huge media attention. Tim (Taylor Kitsch) and Billy (Derek Phillips) are questioned by their lawyer over the stolen cars, and the lawyer states that he can reduce sentencing to 1–5 years if they declare themselves guilty of the charges. Julie (Aimee Teegarden) visits Lorraine (Louanne Stephens) to invite her to a Thanksgiving dinner, only to be surprised when Matt (Zach Gilford) appears.

Tami (Connie Britton) arrives at a press conference with the written apology. However, she dismisses the apology and simply says that she helped Becky (Madison Burge) with full intent. This forces the board to set up a meeting, excluding Tami, as they debate on what to do next. Tami confides in Eric (Kyle Chandler) that she fears losing her job. Eric is also told by Luke (Matt Lauria) that he is considering a transfer to another school with full scholarship. Eric is not agitated by the news, reminding Luke that his decision to not mention the injury jeopardized his career. He then has Luke be present with the uniform during the game, but tells him he will not play.

Matt tries to explain Julie his decision to leave and apologizes once again for doing it that way, but she remains mad over him for never calling her. Matt later visits Landry (Jesse Plemons) for help, but he has his own problems: his relationship with Jess (Jurnee Smollett) ended because she confessed to him that she has feelings for Vince (Michael B. Jordan), which is also affecting their teamwork at the Lions. Landry is also mad at Matt for not contacting him ever since he left for Chicago. Tim is visited by Becky, who scolds him for his robberies and admits that her mother was right in not trusting him. At the Thanksgiving dinner with the Taylors, Billy gives a toast for all the blessings, lamenting his decisions. Tim once again visits Becky, telling her that he knows what to do. He asks her if he can earn her forgiveness, and she says he can.

During the game, the Lions manage to hold off the Panthers despite being behind by a few points, although Landry misses a crucial extra point during the first half. As J.D. (Jeremy Sumpter) starts getting nervous, Eric gets Luke in the game and instructs Vince to use a new technique. With just 14 seconds left, the Lions are still losing 22-24. While managing to run for a few yards, Luke is aggressively hit and is forced to leave for the remainder of the game. Eric then gets Landry back on to make a 45-yard field goal, something he has never accomplished. Despite the pressure, Landry manages to hit the mark, earning the win for the Lions and preventing the Panthers from going to the playoffs.

Tami is told that she is being given six months of administrative leave, which her lawyer disputes. However, Tami instead decides to resign and become a counselor at East Dillon High. Matt and Julie eventually reconcile and he invites her to come join him in Chicago for a weekend, but she declines, feeling that, being there with him, she might fall in love also with the city and abandon her dreams. Tim tells Billy that he will take the hit for the robberies to avoid Billy from going to prison so that he can be with his newly formed family, despite Billy's protests. Billy takes him to county jail, where Tim surrenders. Matt makes amends with Landry, and leaves back for Chicago with him instead of Julie.

== Production ==
=== Development ===
The episode was written by executive producer Jason Katims, and directed by producer Michael Waxman. This was Katims' tenth writing credit, and Waxman's seventh directing credit.

== Reception ==
=== Viewers ===
In its original American broadcast on NBC, "Thanksgiving" was seen by an estimated 3.56 million household viewers with a 1.1/5 in the 18–49 demographics. This means that 1.1 percent of all households with televisions watched the episode, while 5 percent of all of those watching television at the time of the broadcast watched it. This was a 14% increase in viewership from the previous episode, which was watched by an estimated 3.12 million household viewers with a 0.9/4 in the 18–49 demographics.

=== Critical reviews ===
"Thanksgiving" received critical acclaim. Eric Goldman of IGN gave the episode a "great" 8 out of 10 and wrote, "While perhaps not quite living up to the notably high standards set by previous season finales for this series, "Thanksgiving" still ended Friday Night Lights' fourth season on a compelling, if not perfect, note."

Keith Phipps of The A.V. Club gave the episode an "A" grade and wrote, "Togetherness has a way of vanishing, too. The episode ends with Saracen, Chicago-bound and Julie-less again and looking sad even with an excited Landry by his side. Will we see him again? As Friday Night Lights heads into its fifth final season, his character's future remains unclear, a football sailing toward some landing place we can't yet make out." Ken Tucker of Entertainment Weekly wrote, "Seeing that close-up of Zach Gilford gave me pause: If there's one thing this hour didn't do, it was to raise the stakes for new characters such as Vince or Jess or anyone else on the Lions team. But I'm sure the producers will remedy this as soon as the fifth season commences. If there's one thing we've learned, it's that when we speak of Friday Night Lights and its ratings-cursed, quality-blessed existence, all things come to those who wait."

Alan Sepinwall wrote, "FNL season four lived up to the expectations created in the season three finale - not just in terms of what happened, but in terms of how good so much of it was." Allison Waldman of TV Squad wrote, "In all, it was a wonderful season. Just 13 episodes, but a transition was made involving major characters - like Tim and Matt - while others reaffirmed their commitment."

Matt Richenthal of TV Fanatic gave the episode a 4 star out of 5 rating and wrote, "The season four finale tried to cram a whole lot into just one hour, as the first half was filled with so many scenes, involving so many characters and storylines, that I had to grab my neck to keep my head from spinning. It all felt a bit jumbled, which goes along with one criticism I've had throughout this ambitious season." Andy Greenwald of Vulture wrote, "beat for beat, this was easily the best season of Friday Night Lights since the first and one of the most compelling, complete seasons of any program anywhere in the last few years." Television Without Pity gave the episode an "A" grade.

=== Accolades ===
Jason Katims submitted this episode for consideration for Outstanding Writing for a Drama Series at the 62nd Primetime Emmy Awards.
