= The Lights in Carroll Park =

- Friday Night Lights episode
- Episode no.: Season 4 Episode 9
- Directed by: Christopher Misiano
- Written by: Patrick Massett; John Zinman
- Cinematography by: Todd McMullen
- Editing by: Ron Rosen
- Original release dates: January 13, 2010 (DirecTV); July 2, 2010 (NBC)
- Running time: 43 minutes

Guest appearances
- Steve Harris as Virgil Merriweather; Brad Leland as Buddy Garrity; D. W. Moffett as Joe McCoy; Lawrence Gilliard Jr. as Elden; Matt Barr as Ryan Lowry; Madison Burge as Becky Sproles

Episode chronology
← Previous "Toilet Bowl"	Next → "I Can't"
- Friday Night Lights (season 4)

"The Lights in Carroll Park" is the ninth episode of the fourth season of the American sports drama television series Friday Night Lights, inspired by the 1990 nonfiction book by H. G. Bissinger. It is the 59th overall episode of the series and was written by co-executive producers Patrick Massett and John Zinman, and directed by Christopher Misiano. It originally aired on DirecTV's 101 Network on January 13, 2010, before airing on NBC on July 2, 2010.

The series is set in the fictional town of Dillon, a small, close-knit community in rural West Texas. It follows a high school football team, the Dillon Panthers. It features a set of characters, primarily connected to Coach Eric Taylor, his wife Tami, and their daughter Julie. In the episode, Eric tries to help building bigger security for the team. Meanwhile, Becky discovers she is pregnant, while Julie hangs out with a new friend.

According to Nielsen Media Research, the episode was seen by an estimated 3.46 million household viewers and gained a 1.1/5 ratings share among adults aged 18–49. The episode received very positive reviews from critics, who praised the performances and handling of its subject matter.

== Plot ==
Eric (Kyle Chandler) visits Carroll Park to look for Dallas Tinker, one of his players who has been skipping practice. As he deals with a gang, gunshots are heard and the police arrive to check on a 12-year-old who got shot. Vince (Michael B. Jordan) tries to apply for a job, but the interview is declined due to his criminal past.

Becky (Madison Burge) is shocked to discover that her one-night-stand with Luke (Matt Lauria) resulted in her getting pregnant. She does not disclose this to Tim (Taylor Kitsch), feeling she does not want to repeat her mother's mistakes by getting pregnant in her teenage years. She reveals the pregnancy to Luke, asking for money to get an abortion. Luke agrees to help her in the payment, but also expresses doubt over the idea. Julie (Aimee Teegarden) enrolls in a Habitat for Humanity position, working with a boy named Ryan (Matt Barr). During one of their meetings, they share a kiss.

Buddy (Brad Leland) visits Virgil (Steve Harris), revealing that he has met with the mayor to impose bigger security in Carroll Park. Virgil mocks Buddy's idea, feeling that he cannot save the crime-ridden area. Instead, he gets Buddy and Eric in touch with Elden (Lawrence Gilliard Jr.), a former gang member who can help them. During this, Eric is approached by Glenn (Steven Walters), apologizing for kissing Tami (Connie Britton), something that Eric didn't know. Eric talks with Tami over the problem, and both reconcile as Tami called out Glenn for his act. While discussing some J.D.'s recent problematic behaviors at school, Tami discovers that Joe (D. W. Moffett) and Katie have separated.

As Elden and his gang help in putting lights on Carroll Park, Landry (Jesse Plemons) tells Vince that he is now dating Jess (Jurnee Smollett) and he will have to accept it. The Lions then play a friendly game with Elden's gang to celebrate the new lights. Eric is impressed with one of Elden's players, and offers him in joining the team the following year. Becky confronts Tim over regretting their kiss, feeling that it wasn't a mistake. Tim expresses that Becky just ignored him after the kiss, confusing him, and he doesn’t want to ruin their current relationship. Becky finally admits her pregnancy, and cries over Tim's shoulder.

== Production ==
=== Development ===
The episode was written by co-executive producers Patrick Massett and John Zinman, and directed by Christopher Misiano. This was Massett's ninth writing credit, Zinman's ninth writing credit, and Misiano's second directing credit.

== Reception ==
=== Viewers ===
In its original American broadcast on NBC, "The Lights in Carroll Park" was seen by an estimated 3.46 million household viewers with a 1.1/5 in the 18–49 demographics. This means that 1.1 percent of all households with televisions watched the episode, while 5 percent of all of those watching television at the time of the broadcast watched it. This was a slight decrease in viewership from the previous episode, which was watched by an estimated 3.54 million household viewers with a 1.1/5 in the 18–49 demographics.

=== Critical reviews ===
"The Lights in Carroll Park" received very positive reviews from critics. Keith Phipps of The A.V. Club gave the episode a "B+" grade and wrote, "Of course, being movies about having babies, each had a practical reason for their characters to go through with the pregnancy: Without it, there's no movie. That's not true of Friday Night Lights, which has the chance to deal with the situation with all the accompanying thorns. It gets points just for taking it on, even more for handling it well, so far at least."

Ken Tucker of Entertainment Weekly wrote, "Friday Night Lights ventured more thoroughly than ever this week into the neighborhoods of the East Dillon school district. It was a nervy move, letting Coach Eric be our wary guide to the area, as he saw the outcome of a stray shooting while walking through the Carroll Park of the episode's title."

Alan Sepinwall wrote, "Madison Burge and the writers have made Becky the most clearly-established of the four new characters this season, and I can understand how she might wind up accidentally repeating her mother's history, even though I was surprised to realize she had sex with Luke after she ran into him at the liquor store in 'The Son.' But I'm wary of where this story goes over the rest of the season." Allison Waldman of TV Squad wrote, "This was a typical episode of Friday Night Lights, layered with character development and conflicts, emotions out of whack, and problems that seem to crop up out of nowhere. It's a lot like life."

Andy Greenwald of Vulture wrote, "Other than sounding like a lost seventies urban crime flick starring Gene Hackman and John Cazale, 'The Lights in Carroll Park' is an extremely strong episode that — no doubt unintentionally — keeps Riggins in the background, allowing the other characters their shine." Matt Richenthal of TV Fanatic gave the episode a 4.6 star rating out of 5 and wrote, "kudos to the writers for avoiding another cliche and even acknowledging it during the episode: the white man that gets inspired by seeing one incidence of violence and wants to suddenly make a difference. Eric was aware of this perception and made it clear his goal was more modest - let's get the lights turned on and go from there." Television Without Pity gave the episode an "A" grade.
