= Injury List (Friday Night Lights) =

- Friday Night Lights episode
- Episode no.: Season 4 Episode 11
- Directed by: Seith Mann
- Written by: Kerry Ehrin
- Cinematography by: Todd McMullen
- Editing by: Stephen Michael
- Original release dates: January 27, 2010 (DirecTV); July 23, 2010 (NBC)
- Running time: 43 minutes

Guest appearances
- Zach Gilford as Matt Saracen; Alicia Witt as Cheryl Sproles; Brad Leland as Buddy Garrity; Glenn Morshower as Chad Clarke; Madison Burge as Becky Sproles

Episode chronology
← Previous "I Can't"	Next → "Laboring"
- Friday Night Lights (season 4)

"Injury List" is the eleventh episode of the fourth season of the American sports drama television series Friday Night Lights, inspired by the 1990 nonfiction book by H. G. Bissinger. It is the 61st overall episode of the series and was written by consulting producer Kerry Ehrin and directed by Seith Mann. It originally aired on DirecTV's 101 Network on January 27, 2010, before airing on NBC on July 23, 2010.

The series is set in the fictional town of Dillon, a small, close-knit community in rural West Texas. It follows a high school football team, the Dillon Panthers. It features a set of characters, primarily connected to Coach Eric Taylor, his wife Tami, and their daughter Julie. In the episode, Tami gets involved in a controversial manner, while Julie is finally called by Matt. Meanwhile, Tim buys the land, and Luke struggles with his injury.

According to Nielsen Media Research, the episode was seen by an estimated 3.49 million household viewers and gained a 1.0/4 ratings share among adults aged 18–49. The episode received very positive reviews from critics, with praise towards the performances, although the subplots each drew different reactions.

== Plot ==
The Lions will face the Panthers within two weeks, but Eric (Kyle Chandler) is more focused on the next game. Luke (Matt Lauria) picks up medicine from the doctor, but is told that it will be his last supply. In Chicago, Matt (Zach Gilford) is shown living in a small apartment.

Tim (Taylor Kitsch) buys the open field, and decides to take Becky (Madison Burge) and Cheryl (Alicia Witt) out to celebrate. Becky is suspicious of the payment, as Tim says that he got it from Buddy (Brad Leland). Later, a drunk Cheryl tries to kiss Tim at his trailer, but he advices her not to make the same mistake again. Julie (Aimee Teegarden) is finally called by Matt for the first time since he left, but she excuses herself to hang up the call as she feels too overwhelmed to talk to him. Eventually, when he calls her again, she finally confronts him about never calling her, feeling that, since he left that way, their relationship didn't mean anything for him even though they were together for years. Matt admits he screwed up very bad and apologizes, telling her he misses her, but Julie is too angry and refuses to forgive him, hanging up again.

Tami (Connie Britton) is confronted by Luke's parents, as they feel she influenced Becky in getting an abortion, and they object to the board for her behavior. At the meeting, Tami explains that she never advised Becky in getting it and she simply wanted to help her with her crisis. The following day, she is informed that the board voted 5-1 in her favor. Luke gets into an argument with his mother over her meeting, and then leaves to get Oxycontin from local drug dealers, unaware that Dallas is watching him. Landry (Jesse Plemons) gets Jess (Jurnee Smollett) to dine with his parents, although the dinner proves to be an uncomfortable experience.

Before the game against Westcott, Dallas asks Luke about his visit, and he reveals his injury. Dallas promises not to say anything. However, Luke is severely injured during the game, ending his season. Vince (Michael B. Jordan) continues helping his friends in getting money, but is shocked when one of them is killed in front of him. Tami is called by a reporter, who asks about the board decision. Tim joins Becky in watching a movie, but Cheryl arrives and believes they had sex. Despite Becky's pleas, Cheryl kicks Tim out of the house, telling him he will amount to nothing. Becky visits him at the shop, telling him her mother is wrong and he accomplished so much and thanking him for always being there for her, and they bid farewell. Jess arrives home and finds Vince waiting for her. When she asks what happened, he breaks down in tears on her shoulder after telling her about his friend being killed.

== Production ==
=== Development ===
The episode was written by consulting producer Kerry Ehrin, and directed by Seith Mann. This was Ehrin's tenth writing credit, and Mann's second directing credit.

== Reception ==
=== Viewers ===
In its original American broadcast on NBC, "Injury List" was seen by an estimated 3.49 million household viewers with a 1.0/4 in the 18–49 demographics. This means that 1 percent of all households with televisions watched the episode, while 4 percent of all of those watching television at the time of the broadcast watched it. This was a 5% decrease in viewership from the previous episode, which was watched by an estimated 3.65 million household viewers with a 1.0/4 in the 18–49 demographics.

=== Critical reviews ===
"Injury List" received very positive reviews from critics. Eric Goldman of IGN gave the episode a "great" 8 out of 10 and wrote, "A lot was going on in this episode, including the notable reveal that the Lions were two weeks away from facing the Panthers – a face off we've all been waiting to see, and that I presume will end the season, which clearly is not leading (nor should it lead) towards the Lions making it anywhere near State."

Keith Phipps of The A.V. Club gave the episode an "A–" grade and wrote, "This was another wrenching episode, even by the standards set by last week's “I Can't,” but no moment got to me quite as much as Becky's “Goodbye, Tim Riggins” address after she watched her mother throw him out for reasons I’m not even sure Cheryl believed." Ken Tucker of Entertainment Weekly wrote, "Don't get me wrong, I love Friday Night Lights and I'm completely absorbed in the way Coach Eric is grappling with the challenge of building the Lions up from the ground. But this week's episode gathered some of my least favorite subplots and really ran with them, with varying degrees of success."

Alan Sepinwall wrote, "The end of these 13-episode seasons can really sneak up on you. It wasn't until after I had watched and written about last week's "I Can't" that it occurred to me that we only had three episodes left to go. But with the East vs. West Dillon game coming up, and all the big, unsettling developments of 'Injury List,' it's impossible to not realize that the end of the season is barreling towards all our characters like a freight train." Allison Waldman of TV Squad wrote, "This was a rough episode of Friday Night Lights, filled with frustrating actions, characters doing things that make you want to yell at the screen, situations that shouldn't be happening at all. But this is Dillon, Texas and there's a world of drama going on even in a town seemingly as mundane as this one. It's not really just about football. It's about life."

Andy Greenwald of Vulture wrote, "While the relentlessly heavy drama of 'Injury Report' might make it a little harder to make jokes, that's a price we're happy to pay for a season that has given us paper cuts from thumbing through our thesaurus looking up synonyms for 'consistently phenomenal.'" Matt Richenthal of TV Fanatic gave the episode a 4.6 star rating out of 5 and wrote, "Luke may have been the Lions player to leave tonight's episode with a hip flexor, but he was far from the only casualty on an installment aptly titled 'Injury List.'" Television Without Pity gave the episode an "A" grade.

=== Accolades ===
Seith Mann submitted this episode for consideration for Outstanding Directing for a Drama Series at the 62nd Primetime Emmy Awards.
