= In the Bag (Friday Night Lights) =

- Friday Night Lights episode
- Episode no.: Season 4 Episode 7
- Directed by: Stephen Kay
- Written by: Ron Fitzgerald
- Cinematography by: Todd McMullen
- Editing by: Stephen Michael
- Original release dates: December 16, 2009 (DirecTV); June 18, 2010 (NBC)
- Running time: 43 minutes

Guest appearances
- Kim Dickens as Shelby Saracen; Alicia Witt as Cheryl Sproles; Barry Tubb as Tom Cafferty; Madison Burge as Becky Sproles

Episode chronology
← Previous "Stay"	Next → "Toilet Bowl"
- Friday Night Lights (season 4)

"In the Bag" is the seventh episode of the fourth season of the American sports drama television series Friday Night Lights, inspired by the 1990 nonfiction book by H. G. Bissinger. It is the 57th overall episode of the series and was written by producer Ron Fitzgerald, and directed by Stephen Kay. It originally aired on DirecTV's 101 Network on December 16, 2009, before airing on NBC on June 18, 2010.

The series is set in the fictional town of Dillon, a small, close-knit community in rural West Texas. It follows a high school football team, the Dillon Panthers. It features a set of characters, primarily connected to Coach Eric Taylor, his wife Tami, and their daughter Julie. In the episode, Julie tries to move on after Matt leaves Dillon, while Eric appoints Vince as quarterback. Meanwhile, Tim is introduced to Becky's father, while Tami goes out with Glenn.

According to Nielsen Media Research, the episode was seen by an estimated 3.43 million household viewers and gained a 1.0/4 ratings share among adults aged 18–49. The episode received positive reviews from critics, who praised the performances and character development.

== Plot ==
Julie (Aimee Teegarden) is still devastated over Matt's departure, often spending the day waiting for him to call. Tami (Connie Britton) finds that Dillon has been awarded by the National Blue Ribbon Schools Program. Eric (Kyle Chandler) tells the Lions that Vince (Michael B. Jordan) will now be quarterback, to Vince's delight.

Eric is approached by the police as they suspect Vince is hiding a gun in his locker. He is forced to let them check, but they do not find anything. Eric chastises Luke (Matt Lauria) for constantly missing practice, as Luke is very busy helping his father (Barry Tubb) with fixing a fence at his ranch. Luke stands up to his father, proclaiming he will only help with the fence after school, upsetting him. Tami accepts an invitation by Glenn (Steven Walters) to celebrate her award, so he takes her to a bar to sing karaoke. As Tami prepares to leave, a drunken Glenn suddenly kisses her on the lips. He apologizes, but she downplays it. The following day, they talk about the event at school, and they both reconcile their friendship.

Mindy (Stacey Oristano) starts feeling bad, so Tim (Taylor Kitsch) and Billy (Derek Phillips) take her to a hospital, where the doctor says that she needs to stay for a few weeks as the final months of the pregnancy approach. Struggling to pay the medical bills, Billy accepts one of Mindy's co-workers' suggestion at throwing a party at his repair shop to raise funds. At home, Tim sees as Becky (Madison Burge) welcomes his father, who arrives for a visit. However, he and Cheryl (Alicia Witt) are on very bad terms and often argue over his absence. To complicate matters, Tim finds that the father now has another family, something that Becky does not know.

To distract herself, Julie enrolls into an academic club, alongside Landry (Jesse Plemons) and Jess (Jurnee Smollett). She proves to be fierce and very pressuring over her other classmates, worrying Landry. While visiting Lorraine (Louanne Stephens) and Shelby (Kim Dickens), Julie is heartbroken to discover that Matt already called them from Chicago. She cries in Tami's shoulders, lamenting that Matt moved on from her. She sets out to continue with the academic club, delivering a correct answer during a game while on tears. During this, Landry waits to meet with Tyra at a certain location, but is frustrated when she never shows up nor calls him.

At the fundraiser, Billy meets with one of Vince's friends, who offers him a chance in making money if he works for him, interesting him. Tim bluntly tells Becky about his father's new family, causing her to cry. Becky's father confronts Tim and they engage in a fight. The following day, the father leaves the house in shame. Vince visits Eric to give him the gun, promising that he will do better. The Lions help Luke in fixing the fence, pleasing his father. However, Luke accidentally hurts his hip when cattle pushes the gate over him. Landry asks Jess to go on a date with him, saying that he is over Tyra. Tim gets the father's dog out to the field to release him, where he is fascinated by the landscape on sale.

== Production ==
=== Development ===
The episode was written by producer Ron Fitzgerald, and directed by Stephen Kay. This was Fitzgerald's first writing credit, and Kay's first directing credit.

== Reception ==
=== Viewers ===
In its original American broadcast on NBC, "In the Bag" was seen by an estimated 3.43 million household viewers with a 1.0/4 in the 18–49 demographics. This means that 1 percent of all households with televisions watched the episode, while 4 percent of all of those watching television at the time of the broadcast watched it. This was a 7% decrease in viewership from the previous episode, which was watched by an estimated 3.66 million household viewers with a 1.0/4 in the 18–49 demographics.

=== Critical reviews ===
"In the Bag" received positive reviews from critics. Eric Goldman of IGN gave the episode a "good" 7.5 out of 10 and wrote, "This episode certainly had its ups and downs. There were some strong, poignant moments, but there were others that felt uncharacteristically false for this show – including the off screen character assassination of two original Friday Night Lights characters."

Keith Phipps of The A.V. Club gave the episode an "A–" grade and wrote, "Friday Night Lights is a show that loves football and high school sports, but it also repeatedly questions them, too, from the library vs. Jumbotron debate to its portrayal of a town whose football enthusiasm borders on monomania." Ken Tucker of Entertainment Weekly wrote, "All in all, another plot-crammed episode. Maybe too crammed? Maybe not enough forward-narrative momentum?"

Alan Sepinwall wrote, "Lots going on here. Lots of characters in flux, and lots of potential for the latter half of the season." Allison Waldman of TV Squad wrote, "Friday Night Lights is a show that's as much about subtle touches as it is about bone-crunching hits on the football field. This episode was all about pain, but not just the kind that requires a doctor's touch. Julie felt it, as did Landry, Becky, Vince and Tim in their own ways."

Andy Greenwald of Vulture wrote, "New people, new situations. The only thing that isn't new is how much we're loving it. Is the season more than halfway over already?" Matt Richenthal of TV Fanatic gave the episode a 4.8 star rating out of 5 and wrote, "Another week, another great episode of Friday Night Lights." Television Without Pity wrote, "So Matt's gone, baby, gone, and Julie copes by drowning herself - and a commandeered Landry - in extracurriculars, including Academic Smackdown, which Julie attacks like the WWE product it's named for."
