= Friday Night Lights season 4 =

Friday Night Lights
- Season 4
- Season 4 DVD cover
- No. of episodes: 13

Release
- Original network: The 101 Network (first run); NBC (network)
- Original release: October 29, 2009 – February 10, 2010

Season chronology
- ← Previous; Season 3 Next → Season 5

The fourth season of the American serial drama television series Friday Night Lights commenced airing in the United States and Canada on October 28, 2009. It was the second season to be aired on DirecTV's The 101 Network. The 13-episode season concluded on The 101 Network on February 10, 2010, and then began its run on NBC on May 7, 2010, which concluded on August 6, 2010. The fourth season was released on DVD in region 1 on August 10, 2010.

The season focuses on the reopened East Dillon High School and the East Dillon Lions football team.

== Cast ==
=== Main cast ===
- Kyle Chandler as Eric Taylor
- Connie Britton as Tami Taylor
- Taylor Kitsch as Tim Riggins
- Jesse Plemons as Landry Clarke
- Aimee Teegarden as Julie Taylor
- Michael B. Jordan as Vince Howard
- Jurnee Smollett as Jess Merriweather
- Matt Lauria as Luke Cafferty

=== Recurring cast ===
- Zach Gilford as Matt Saracen
- Brad Leland as Buddy Garrity
- Madison Burge as Becky Sproles
- Alicia Witt as Cheryl Sproles
- Jeremy Sumpter as J.D. McCoy
- Derek Phillips as Billy Riggins
- Louanne Stephens as Lorraine Saracen
- Kim Dickens as Shelby Saracen
- Stacey Oristano as Mindy Riggins
- Blue Deckert as Mac McGill
- Steve Harris as Virgil Merriweather
- Dana Wheeler-Nicholson as Angela Collette
- Angela Rawna as Regina Howard
- Minka Kelly as Lyla Garrity
- D.W. Moffett as Joe McCoy

== Season synopsis ==
Coach Taylor works to establish a football program at the poorly-funded East Dillon High School. Most of the players have not played football before, adding to the difficulties. Landry Clarke ends up in the boundaries of East Dillon and plays football there, eventually becoming the kicker of the team. Vince Howard, a troubled teen, is brought onto the team by Coach Taylor and eventually becomes quarterback. Both Landry and Vince compete for the attention of the same girl, Jess Merriweather. Jess's father is a former East Dillon player that Coach Taylor tries to get more involved in the program, along with other former East Dillon players. The new star Panthers player Luke Cafferty is transferred to East Dillon after it is revealed he does not live in Dillon High boundaries. Tim Riggins quits college and moves back to Dillon to work with his brother Billy in their car repair shop. Billy and his new wife Mindy don't let him live in their home, so Tim moves out into a trailer. The trailer is on the property of a woman Tim slept with previously, and while living there he befriends her daughter Becky Sproles. Becky has a crush on him, but he treats her more like a sister. Tami Taylor continues to navigate politics as the principal of Dillon High as she becomes unpopular by the transfer of Luke to East Dillon and when she is wrongly accused of telling a student to get an abortion. Matt Saracen goes to Dillon Tech, but eventually moves to Chicago, much to the dismay of his girlfriend, Julie Taylor. Julie is now a senior in High School, and decided to attend East Dillon to set an example that there is nothing wrong with the school. J.D. McCoy becomes heavily arrogant, and bullying (unlike the shy, and strait-laced teammate he was the previous season). The season charts the uphill battle of the East Dillon Lions football team, ultimately culminating in a win against rival Dillon High School which keeps the Dillon Panthers out of the year’s playoffs.

== Fictional game results ==
Fictional game results
Opponent	Result	Score	Record	Episode No.	Episode
Regular season^{[a]}
South King Rangers	Loss	0–45^{[b]}	0–1	1	"East of Dillon"
South Milbank Rattlers	Loss	6–27^{[c]}	0–2	3	"In the Skin of a Lion"
South Pines Tigers	Loss	14–24	0–3	5	"The Son"
McNulty Mavericks	Loss	7–14	0–4	6	"Stay"
Campbell Park Timberwolves	Win	23–21	1–4	8	"Toilet Bowl"
Wescott Warriors	Loss	0–7^{[d]}	1–5	11	"Injury List"
Dillon Panthers	Win	25–24^{[e]}	2–5	13	"Thanksgiving"

^{a} At the beginning of season five of Friday Night Lights, it is revealed that the East Dillon Lions' record during the season represented above was two wins and eight losses. Thus, three games (all losses) were not included in episodes. Public high schools in Texas typically play a ten game regular season.
^{b} Down 45–0, the Lions forfeited the game at halftime due to injuries.
^{c} Down 27–0, the Lions score a touchdown. It's not shown if the extra point was converted.
^{d} The Lions are down 7–0 at one point. The final score was not shown.
^{e} Landry Clarke kicks the game-winning field goal to beat the Panthers, and the Panthers therefore do not make the playoffs.

== Episodes ==
No. overall	No. in season	Title	Directed by	Written by	Original release date	U.S. viewers (millions)
51	1	"East of Dillon"	Peter Berg	Jason Katims	October 28, 2009 (DirectTV); May 7, 2010 (NBC)	3.90
Coach Taylor assembles his new team at East Dillon. Tami adapts to the new and unsettling atmosphere of West Dillon. Matt deals with life after football. East Dillon Lions face a tough time on the field in their first game of the season.
52	2	"After the Fall"	Michael Waxman	Kerry Ehrin	November 4, 2009 (DirectTV); May 14, 2010 (NBC)	3.97
Coach tries to reenergize the broken spirits of his team as he gains a new player. Tami takes a stand that ruffles feathers. Matt meets a local artist. Tim is kicked out by Billy and Mindy and moves into a trailer.
53	3	"In the Skin of a Lion"	Patrick Norris	Patrick Massett & John Zinman	November 11, 2009 (DirectTV); May 21, 2010 (NBC)	3.96
Coach betrays Tami's trust during a financial decision. Tensions rise between Luke and Vince, and the Lions get new uniforms.
54	4	"A Sort of Homecoming"	Christopher Misiano	Etan Frankel	November 18, 2009 (DirectTV); May 28, 2010 (NBC)	3.53
The boosters go after Tami. Eric learns about East Dillon's history during Homecoming Week. Matt goes hunting with Tim and discovers terrible news. Julie and Devin go to a gay bar. Landry and Vince become involved with Jess.
55	5	"The Son"	Allison Liddi-Brown	Rolin Jones	December 2, 2009 (DirectTV); June 4, 2010 (NBC)	3.83
Eric, Tami, Julie, and Landry rally around Matt during a family crisis; Vince jeopardizes his football career in order to support his family; and Becky and Tim become closer.
56	6	"Stay"	Patrick Norris	Bridget Carpenter	December 9, 2009 (DirectTV); June 11, 2010 (NBC)	3.66
Eric devises a game plan against the number one team in Texas; the McNulty Mavericks. Matt and Julie go to a music festival in Austin; and Tim reunites with Lyla.
57	7	"In the Bag"	Stephen Kay	Ron Fitzgerald	December 16, 2009 (DirectTV); June 18, 2010 (NBC)	3.43
Vince wins the quarterback position; Tami soothes Julie; Luke sustains an injury; Landry makes a move on Jess; Tim runs into Becky's father.
58	8	"Toilet Bowl"	Michael Waxman	Derek Santos Olson	January 6, 2010 (DirectTV); June 25, 2010 (NBC)	3.54
Eric realizes that East Dillon's problems aren't only on the field; Julie and Tami take a college trip to Boston; Luke's injury takes its toll; Tim makes a decision that could backfire.
59	9	"The Lights in Carroll Park"	Christopher Misiano	Patrick Massett & John Zinman	January 13, 2010 (DirectTV); July 2, 2010 (NBC)	3.46
Eric runs into shady characters while trying to clean up a run-down park; Julie befriends someone new; Jess and Landry's romance heats up.
60	10	"I Can't"	Ami Canaan Mann	Bridget Carpenter	January 20, 2010 (DirectTV); July 9, 2010 (NBC)	3.65
Tim puts Tami in a tough spot; Julie asks a friend to dinner; Vince's mom has a health crisis; Luke's parents look for ways to help him; and Eric is urged to change his coaching style.
61	11	"Injury List"	Seith Mann	Kerry Ehrin	January 27, 2010 (DirectTV); July 23, 2010 (NBC)	3.49
The team has trouble focusing; Tami gets involved in a controversial matter; Julie receives an upsetting phone call; Tim makes a big purchase.
62	12	"Laboring"	Adam Davidson	Rolin Jones	February 3, 2010 (DirectTV); July 30, 2010 (NBC)	3.12
Eric decides to bench Luke; Tami tries to pacify her critics; the Riggins brothers adjust to new developments.
63	13	"Thanksgiving"	Michael Waxman	Jason Katims	February 10, 2010 (DirectTV); August 6, 2010 (NBC)	3.56
The Lions prepare for the upcoming game against the West Dillon Panthers, which will decide whether or not the Panthers will go to the playoffs. The Taylors host Thanksgiving dinner. Eric advises Vince to act more selfishly; A very special visitor surprises Julie and Landry; Tim makes a tough call and goes to prison for Billy so that he can raise his family.

== Reception ==
=== Critical response ===
On Rotten Tomatoes, the season has an approval rating of 100% with an average score of 8.9 out of 10 based on 27 reviews. The website's critical consensus reads, "In its penultimate season, Friday Night Lights continues the raw, heartfelt drama fans expect while adding a few fresh narrative twists." On the review aggregator website Metacritic, the fourth season scored 87 out of 100, based on 18 reviews, indicating "Universal acclaim". Matthew Gilbert of The Boston Globe wrote "the NBC series certainly has been one of TV's most emotionally honest and stirring works, and it remains so as it enters its fourth season." Verne Gay of Newsday praised several elements, calling it "quirky, funny, smart" and has "wonderful acting". Matt Roush of TV Guide lauded the series' authenticity, saying "you can't help but get emotionally involved in the lives of these instantly recognizable and compelling characters." Kris King of Slant Magazine praised the series, despite the change of setting and characters, saying, "On a whole, the new season of Friday Night Lights manages to retain its depth and heart-wrenching warmth despite a sea change in its structure and characters."

=== Accolades ===
For the 62nd Primetime Emmy Awards, Kyle Chandler and Connie Britton received their first nominations for Outstanding Lead Actor in a Drama Series and Outstanding Lead Actress in a Drama Series, respectively. Rolin Jones was nominated for Outstanding Writing for a Drama Series for the episode "The Son", and the series received its fourth consecutive nomination for Outstanding Casting for a Drama Series.
