= Laboring (Friday Night Lights) =

- Friday Night Lights episode
- Episode no.: Season 4 Episode 12
- Directed by: Adam Davidson
- Written by: Rolin Jones
- Cinematography by: Todd McMullen
- Editing by: Angela M. Catanzaro
- Original release dates: February 3, 2010 (DirecTV); July 30, 2010 (NBC)
- Running time: 43 minutes

Guest appearances
- Brad Leland as Buddy Garrity; Dana Wheeler-Nicholson as Angela Collette; Lorraine Toussaint as Birdie "Bird" Merriweather; D. W. Moffett as Joe McCoy; Jeremy Sumpter as J.D. McCoy; Madison Burge as Becky Sproles

Episode chronology
← Previous "Injury List"	Next → "Thanksgiving"
- Friday Night Lights (season 4)

"Laboring" is the twelfth episode of the fourth season of the American sports drama television series Friday Night Lights, inspired by the 1990 nonfiction book by H. G. Bissinger. It is the 62nd overall episode of the series and was written by supervising producer Rolin Jones, and directed by Adam Davidson. It originally aired on DirecTV's 101 Network on February 3, 2010, before airing on NBC on July 30, 2010.

The series is set in the fictional town of Dillon, a small, close-knit community in rural West Texas. It follows a high school football team, the Dillon Panthers. It features a set of characters, primarily connected to Coach Eric Taylor, his wife Tami, and their daughter Julie. In the episode, the Lions and the Panthers get into a conflict ahead of their game. Meanwhile, Vince considers a risky move, and Tim accompanies Billy during his child's birth.

According to Nielsen Media Research, the episode was seen by an estimated 3.12 million household viewers and gained a 0.9/4 ratings share among adults aged 18–49. The episode received critical acclaim, with critics praising the performances, emotional tone, writing and character development.

== Plot ==
The Panthers and the Lions prepare for their incoming day, which will take place on Black Friday and requires the Lions' field to be properly staged. Julie (Aimee Teegarden) fails in convincing Tami (Connie Britton) in allowing her to go to New Orleans for a trip with Habitat for Humanity. Vince (Michael B. Jordan) visits the family of his deceased friend, Calvin. Jess (Jurnee Smollett) suggests he should talk to the police, but he refuses, intending to get revenge on Calvin's death.

While talking with Becky (Madison Burge), Tim (Taylor Kitsch) receives a call from Billy (Derek Phillips) just as Mindy (Stacey Oristano) is giving birth. Tim waits by the parking lot, only to be joined by an upset Billy, who was kicked out of the hospital room by Mindy and the nurses. Tired of waiting for hours and unwilling to miss his child's birth, Billy ignores security and enters the room to stay with Mindy as she gives birth. Tim later joins them at the room, where he meets his nephew, Steven. Later, Tim and Becky spend time at the open field, where Becky tells Tim she is in love with him, but Tim rejects her confession, making it clear he is not interested in a relationship with her. However, that night, Tim is approached by police officers, who want to question him about stolen cars.

Tami is slammed in the media for the abortion controversy, and is constantly harassed by phone calls. The superintendent shows up and gives her an official statement that the board made for her, but Tami refuses to read it as it claims she is apologizing. He claims that she could lose her job if she does not read the statement. Tami contacts a lawyer for help, who states that while she can win a case of wrongful termination if she is fired for not reading the statement, the case could be dragged out. As it could take years, Tami could struggle in getting a job in the meantime.

Inspired by an idea by Landry (Jesse Plemons), the Lions plant toothpicks across the Panthers' field, delaying their training and taking two hours to remove them all. While Eric (Kyle Chandler) finds it funny, he punishes the Lions by delaying practice until Landry manages to kick a 40-yard field goal. In revenge, Panthers teammates invade the Lions' field and vandalize it beyond repair. During an assembly to discuss damages, Eric refuses to downplay the events as just "a football game" given his family's treatment in the past few days.

Vince prepares to join his gang in tracking the culprits in Calvin's death, despite Jess' protests. However, he balks at the opportunity, and is called a coward by Kennard. He returns home, where he tells Jess that he didn't go forward with his plan, much to her relief. Tim and Billy are shown in jail, awaiting word from the authorities. Eric returns home, telling Tami that the game will be played at the Panthers' field. When the phone rings, Eric smashes it.

== Production ==
=== Development ===
The episode was written by supervising producer Rolin Jones, and directed by Adam Davidson. This was Jones' second writing credit, and Davidson's first directing credit.

== Reception ==
=== Viewers ===
In its original American broadcast on NBC, "Laboring" was seen by an estimated 3.12 million household viewers with a 0.9/4 in the 18–49 demographics. This means that 0.9 percent of all households with televisions watched the episode, while 4 percent of all of those watching television at the time of the broadcast watched it. This was a 11% decrease in viewership from the previous episode, which was watched by an estimated 3.49 million household viewers with a 1.0/4 in the 18–49 demographics.

=== Critical reviews ===
"Laboring" received critical acclaim. Eric Goldman of IGN gave the episode a "great" 8.8 out of 10 and wrote, "Wow, this was not a happy episode. I mean, don't get me wrong - Friday Night Lights is often the opposite of a bundle of laughs. But this was one of those particularly sad, wrenching episodes, where nothing was going right for a group of people most of us watching have grown to love."

Keith Phipps of The A.V. Club gave the episode an "A" grade and wrote, "In some ways, this episode did little but set up the events of next week's finale: The big game with West Dillon, in which the Lions could play spoilers to their rivals’ playoff hopes, Tami's moment of truth, Julie's decisions about her future, the Riggins Boys' legal problems, and so on. But it's also one of my favorite episodes of the season, forcing the characters to crisis points that could fundamentally change who they are and sustaining a mood of slowly mounting tension that's forever threatening to erupt." Ken Tucker of Entertainment Weekly wrote, "This week, the second-to-last Friday Night Lights episode of the fourth season gave us a birth, a death, and a number of plot developments that signal significant changes for some of the series' best characters."

Alan Sepinwall wrote, "'Laboring' was a table-setter that brought a lot to the table on its own: great moments for half the cast and some huge developments in their own right, regardless of how things play out in the finale." Allison Waldman of TV Squad wrote, "Bigger than right or wrong, yes or no, play or don't play. In this penultimate episode of Friday Night Lights, the problems were everywhere, but solutions - unfortunately - were hard to come by. More on the big game, toothpicks, apologies and Habitat for Humanities after the jump."

Andy Greenwald of Vulture wrote, "It was never Mayberry, but life in East Dillon is completely stripped of any Hollywoodian happy endings or gloss. And we love it! But sometimes, like with this week's episode 'Laboring,' this love can be a very painful thing indeed." Television Without Pity gave the episode an "A–" grade.
