= Toilet Bowl =

Toilet Bowl may refer to:

- Toilet, a sanitation fixture used primarily for the disposal of human excrement and urine
- A natural large tidepool at Hanauma Bay, on Oahu, Hawaii
- Any football game between two very poor teams and/or of a very poor standard of play; see bowl game
- The 1983 Oregon State vs. Oregon football game
- A basketball term for when the ball circles the rim before falling
- "Toilet Bowl" (Friday Night Lights), an episode of the TV series Friday Night Lights
