= In the Bag =

In the Bag may refer to:

- In the Bag (film), a 1956 American animated short comedy film
- In the Bag (album), a 1962 album by Nat Adderley
- "In the Bag" (Friday Night Lights), an episode of the TV series Friday Night Lights
