= Derek Santos Olson =

American television writer (born 20th century

Etan Frankel
- Born: 20th century
- Occupation: Television writer
- Writing career
- Notable work: Friday Night Lights television series

Derek Santos Olson (born 20th century) is an American television writer.

He has worked on the NBC television drama series Friday Night Lights and has been nominated for a Writers Guild of America (WGA) Award.

== Biography ==
He began writing for television on the fourth season of Friday Night Lights in 2009. He wrote the episode "The Toilet Bowl". He was nominated for the Writers Guild of America (WGA) Award for Best Drama Series at the February 2010 ceremony for his work on the fourth season.
