= Ron Fitzgerald =

American television writer

- Occupation: Television Writer
- Writing career
- Years active: 2007–present
- Notable works: Weeds; Friday Night Lights

Ron Fitzgerald is an American television writer. He is best known for working on the NBC drama Friday Night Lights and the Showtime comedy Weeds and has been nominated for two Writers Guild of America (WGA) Awards.

== Biography ==
He began writing for television for the fourth season of Weeds in 2008. He wrote the episodes "The Whole Blah Damn Thing" and "Little Boats". He was nominated for the Writers Guild of America (WGA) Award for Best Comedy Series at the February 2009 ceremony for his work on the fourth season. He returned as a writer for the fifth season in 2009. He wrote the episodes "Super Lucky Happy" and "Glue".

He joined the crew of Friday Night Lights as a writer and producer for the series fourth season in 2009. He wrote the episode "In The Bag". He was nominated for the WGA Award for Best Drama Series at the February 2010 ceremony for his work on the fourth season.
