= Patrick Norris =

American television director

- Other name: Patrick R. Norris
- Occupation: Television director
- Years active: 1979–present

Patrick R. Norris is an American television director.

His directing credits include Chuck, Friday Night Lights, Gossip Girl, The Vampire Diaries, Hidden Palms, Related, Bones, North Shore, The Division, The O.C., Boston Public, Star Trek: Enterprise, The Twilight Zone, American Dreams, Roswell, V.I.P., Once and Again, Jack & Jill, Xena: Warrior Princess, Wasteland, Cupid, The Net, Dawson's Creek, The Visitor, Relativity, Malibu Shores, Second Noah, The Marshal, My So-Called Life, Chicago Hope and Party of Five.

In 1989 and 1991, Norris won two Primetime Emmy Awards for "Outstanding Achievement In Costuming For a Series" for his work on the series Thirtysomething.
