= Russell DeGrazier =

American film director

- Born: 1967 (age 58–59)
- Education: University of Southern California (MA)
- Occupations: Screenwriter, director, film producer, actor
- Years active: 1995–present

Russell DeGrazier is an American writer, director, producer and actor. DeGrazier received a master's degree in film from the USC School of Cinematic Arts. His works include the comedy-drama Sunset Strip and the short film 'Mad' Boy, I'll Blow Your Blues Away. Be Mine. He appeared in a reoccurring role in the series Friday Night Lights. He also appeared in an episode of the short-lived NBC series, Chase.

== Filmography ==
=== Acting ===
Year	Title	Role	Notes
2009–2011	Friday Night Lights	Coach Stan Traub	26 episodes
2010	The Good Guys	Burly Ted	Episode: "Silence of the Dan"
2010	My Generation	Professor Balcones	2 episodes
2011	Chase	Seller	Episode: "Annie"

=== Directing ===
Year	Title	Notes
1999	A Fine Day for Flying	Short film
2000	Attraction	Also writer and producer

=== Writing ===
Year	Title	Notes
1997	'Mad' Boy, I'll Blow Your Blues Away. Be Mine	Short film
1999	A Fine Day for Flying	Short film
2000	Sunset Strip	Co-written with Randall Jahnson
2000	Attraction	
