= Steve Harris (actor) =

American actor (born 1965)

- Born: December 3, 1965 (age 60); Chicago, Illinois, U.S.
- Occupation: Actor
- Years active: 1985–present
- Relatives: Wood Harris (brother)

Steve Harris (born December 3, 1965) is an American actor. He has played Eugene Young on the legal drama The Practice, Detective Isaiah "Bird" Freeman on the NBC drama Awake, and Charles McCarter in Tyler Perry’s Diary of a Mad Black Woman.

For The Practice, Harris was twice nominated for the Primetime Emmy Award for Outstanding Supporting Actor in a Drama Series.

== Early life ==
Harris was born in Chicago, Illinois, the son of John Henry Harris, a bus driver and Mattie Harris, a housewife. He is the older brother of actor Wood Harris. He attended St. Joseph High School in Westchester, Illinois, a private school with a reputation for developing star athletes, which also is the focus of the 1994 documentrary, Hoop Dreams. Harris was a running back and later played linebacker for Northern Illinois University, where he studied drama. His athletic career was cut short due to a torn ligament in his ankle. After graduating from Northern Illinois University in 1989, Harris obtained a master's degree in acting at the University of Delaware.

== Career ==
Harris appeared on Law & Order and earlier had a role in Homicide: Life on the Street's pilot. In 2006, he appeared in the now-cancelled TV series Heist. He also appeared in an episode of Grey's Anatomy and in several episodes of New York Undercover. He has appeared in a number of films including; Quarantine, Tyler Perry's Diary of a Mad Black Woman, Bringing Down the House, The Rock, The Mod Squad, Takers, and Minority Report.

From 1997 to 2004, Harris starred as Eugene Young in David E. Kelley's legal drama The Practice. He was nominated for two Emmys and starred in all eight seasons. He has also occasionally done voice acting for animation, notably as Ethan Bennett/Clayface in The Batman.

Harris starred in actress Regina King's directorial debut Let The Church Say Amen which was adapted from ReShonda Tate Billingsley's 2005 best selling novel. The film premiered on Black Entertainment Television (BET) in 2013. He appeared as Nelson Gates, the boss of troubled FBI agent Martin Odum (Sean Bean), in the TV show Legends, which aired on TNT from August 13, 2014 to December 28, 2015.

== Filmography ==
=== Film ===
Year	Title	Role	Notes
1985	Don't Mess With My Sister	Radio Announcer	
1988	Seven Hours to Judgment	Reardon's Van Driver	
1993	Sugar Hill	Ricky Goggles	
1993	The Good Policeman	Big Blue	Television film
1994	Against the Wall	Cecil	Television film
1996	The Rock	Private McCoy	
1997	George Wallace	Neal	Television film
1997	Lesser Prophets	Brick Thrower	
1998	Nightmare Street	Detective Miller	Television film
1998	Lovers and Liars	FBI Agent	
1999	The Mod Squad	Briggs	
2000	King of the World	Sonny Liston	Television film
2000	The Skulls	Detective Sparrow	
2001	Beyond the City Limits	Troy	
2002	Minority Report	Jad	
2003	Bringing Down the House	Widow	
2004	Death and Texas	Bobby 'Barefoot Bobby' Briggs	
2005	Diary of a Mad Black Woman	Charles McCarter	
2005	The Unseen	Roy	
2006	Silas Hunt: A Documentary	Narrator	
2007	Protect and Serve	Dennis Harvey	Television film
2008	Ball Don't Lie	Rob	
2008	Quarantine	Scott Percival	
2008	Good Behavior	Will Stone	Television film
2009	12 Rounds	FBI Agent George Aiken	
2010	Takers	Lieutenant Carver	
2013	Let the Church Say Amen	Simon Jackson	Television film
2014	The Gable 5	Lt. Wade	Short
2014	In Your Eyes	Giddons	
2015	Chi-Raq	Ole Duke	
2017	Burning Sands	Dean Richardson	
2017	Type A	Carson	Television film
2018	The First Purge	Freddy	

=== Television ===
Year	Title	Role	Notes
1993	Homicide: Life on the Street	Bernard	Episode: "Gone for Goode"
1994	Heaven and Hell: North and South Book III	Magic Magee	Recurring role
1994	New York Undercover	Bulldog	Episode: "The Friendly Neighborhood Dealer"
1994	Law & Order	Joey 'Dogs' Lang	Episode: "Wager"
1995	Murder One	Daryl Jackson	Episode: "Chapter Two"
1995	New York Undercover	Terry Ellers	2 episodes
1995	Dark Eyes	Jay Staples	Episode: "Pilot"
1995	Law & Order	Calvin Tiller	Episode: "Act of God"
1997	Chicago Hope	A.S.A. Charles Lamb	Episode: "Lamb to the Slaughter"
1997–2004	The Practice	Eugene Young	Main cast
1998	Ally McBeal	Eugene Young	Episode: "The Inmates"
1999	Jeopardy!	Himself/Celebrity Contestant	Episode: "1999-A Celebrity Jeopardy! Game 4"
2000	The List	Himself	Episode: "Best TV Theme Songs"
2000	The Wild Thornberrys	Makai (voice)	Episode: "Critics Masai"
2002	Intimate Portrait	Himself	Episode: "LisaGay Hamilton"
2004	World Poker Tour	Himself	Episode: "Hollywood Home Game I"
2004–2006	The Batman	Ethan Bennett / Clayface (voice)	Recurring role
2005	Higglytown Heroes	Sports Coach Hero (voice)	Episode: "Havin' a Ball"
2006	Heist	James Johnson	Main cast
2006	Grey's Anatomy	Omar Troussant	Episode: "Time Has Come Today"
2008	Eli Stone	Jayson Turk	Recurring role (season 1)
2009–2010	Friday Night Lights	Virgil Merriweather	Recurring role (season 4)
2011	Harry's Law	Jeffrey Rollins	Episode: "Innocent Man"
2011	Eden	Max Hunt	Episode: "Pilot"
2012	Awake	Detective Isaiah 'Bird' Freeman	Main Cast
2014	Justified	Roscoe	Recurring role (season 5)
2014	Legends	Nelson Gates	Main cast (season 1)
2015	NCIS	Gerald Tanner	Episode: "Cadence"
2017	Ryan Hansen Solves Crimes on Television	Captain Jackson #2	Episode: "Jane D'oh!"
2018	Santa Clarita Diet	Bill Ramirez	Episode: "Hailbut!"
2018	The Crossing	Beaumont	Recurring cast
2019	The Twilight Zone	Neil Harrison	Episode: "Replay"
2019	Tales	McBride	Episode: "Slippery"
2020	Chicago PD	Brian Rochester	Episode: "Before The Fall"
2020	Filthy Rich	Franklin Lee	Main cast
2021	Law & Order: Organized Crime	Ellsworth Lee	Recurring role (season 1)
2021–present	BMF	Detective Bryant	Main cast
2022	Winning Time: The Rise of the Lakers Dynasty	Dr. Thomas Day	Recurring role
