= Matt Saracen =

Fictional character in TV series Friday Night Lights

- Friday Night Lights character
- Zach Gilford as Matthew Saracen
- First appearance: "Pilot"
- Last appearance: "Always"
- Created by: Peter Berg
- Portrayed by: Zach Gilford

In-universe information
- Nicknames: Matt, Matty, QB1, Seven, Cobra, Mayday
- Occupation: High school student (seasons 1-3); Back-up quarterback for the Dillon Panthers ("Pilot," Season 1); Starting quarterback for the Dillon Panthers (seasons 1-3); Wide receiver for the Dillon Panthers (season 3); Alamo Freeze assistant manager (seasons 1-3); Community college student and Panther pizza delivery driver (season 4); College art student (seasons 4-5)
- Family: Lorraine Saracen (Grandmother); Henry Saracen (Father, deceased); Shelby Garrett (Mother); Eric Taylor (Father-in-Law); Tami Taylor (Mother-in-Law); Gracie Taylor (Sister-in-Law)
- Spouse: Julie Taylor

Matthew "Matt" Saracen is a fictional character in the NBC/DirecTV (The 101 Network) television drama series Friday Night Lights portrayed by the actor Zach Gilford. He is the former backup quarterback of the Dillon High School Panthers before being thrust into the starting spotlight after Jason Street suffers a career-ending injury. His character is based on Mike Winchell and Chris Comer from the original 1990 book and the 2004 film.

== Background ==
Matt is the son of Henry Saracen and Shelby Garrett. He lives alone with his grandmother, Lorraine Saracen. Matt takes care of Lorraine due to her old age and battle with dementia. At one time, Matt's relationship with both of his parents was strained. His father, Henry, was in the U.S. Army and his mother, Shelby, left Matt when he was a child after divorcing Henry. The full extent of their relationship is unknown, but it is implied that Henry may have been an abusive husband.

== Overview ==
He is the back-up quarterback for the Dillon Panthers in the ”Pilot” as a sophomore. Eventually, he is the starting quarterback for the Dillon Panthers in seasons 1 and 2. He then becomes a wide receiver for the Dillon Panthers in season 3, his senior year. He is a main character in seasons 1 through 3 and continues to play an important role in the series throughout seasons 4 and 5.

In season 1, when Henry is first introduced, the difficult relationship between father and son is revealed. Throughout the show, it is shown that Matt sees Coach Eric Taylor as more of a father figure than Henry. Henry exhibits some symptoms of posttraumatic stress disorder (P.T.S.D.). Landry warns Matt that Henry may be "all messed up from the war." However, the term is never explicitly mentioned in the show, leading him to become distant and uncaring of his family, which deeply hurts Matt. During his senior year of high school, in season 3, Matt slowly begins reconnecting with his mother, who desperately wants to be a part of her son's life again. The season after graduating, season 4, Matt's father dies after stepping on an IED. Matt became an East Dillon supporter following Coach Taylor coaching the EDHS football program, along with Julie and Landry attending EDHS.

== Characterization ==
Matt is something of an "anti-jock" who "listens to Bob Dylan and draws pictures" and is generally out of place with his teammates, such as Smash Williams and Tim Riggins, who are often seen hanging around girls or at parties, and even his predecessor, the charismatic and popular Jason Street. He is more socially awkward and often looks uncomfortable with the attention he receives as the star quarterback. His closest friend is Landry Clarke, a "nerd". An introvert, Matt's shy nature sometimes comes across as a lack of self-confidence and, according to Smash, he was "so shy he had to e-mail his plays in". Unlike most of his teammates, college football is not high on his priority list after high school.

== Storylines ==
=== Season 1 ===
When the series begins, Matt is the back-up quarterback and something of a social outcast. His best friend is Landry Clarke, an honor student who does not play football. Matt spends much of his varsity career in the shadow of senior, Jason Street, but is thrown in the deep end when Jason suffers a career-ending spinal cord injury during the opening game of the season. Although he does well, his scrawny build does not inspire much confidence from the fans and the Panthers lose the very next game. Matt's name board is vandalized and he is routinely mocked by rival high school students. Crushed by Jason's injury, the town and particularly the team booster club force Coach Taylor to find a new quarterback because they do not believe that Matt can get the job done. As Matt continues to work his heart out and impress his teammates, a new quarterback who was displaced due to Hurricane Katrina, Ray "Voodoo" Tatum, joins the team and temporarily replaces Matt as the starter. However, Voodoo's inability to be a team player and temper causes Coach Taylor to bench him and give the starting position back to Matt. Despite the upturn of events, Matt still struggles with feelings of inferiority and lack of confidence from time to time. In the episode, "Ch-Ch-Ch-Ch-Changes", he, Jason, Riggins, and Smash hang out at the field and confesses that he is not confident of his chances in the upcoming state semifinals against the Brant Vikings, leading Jason to give him an impromptu coaching session right then and there. Jason is seen giving advice and encouraging him at the state semifinals against the Vikings, playing in pouring rain and a muddy field. Saracen finishes his sophomore season with a 60% completion percentage, 2,586 yards, 19 touchdowns, 5 interceptions, and a 121.3 quarterback rating. In the state championship game, he passes for 283 yards and 2 touchdowns in leading the Panthers to a 27–26 epic comeback victory over West Cambria High School.

Matt also begins a relationship with Coach Taylor's daughter, Julie. Beginning as a one-sided crush because of Julie's intentions never to date a football player, the relationship blossoms when Julie recognizes that Matt is not a stereotypical jock. Coach Taylor is not very pleased that they are dating and often interferes with their relationship. Matt also develops a father-son bond with Coach Taylor and feels betrayed when Coach Taylor accepts a job at TMU at the end of the season. Matt's relationship with Coach never fully recovers.

=== Season 2 ===
Season 2 begins with Matt's relationship with Julie, who stays in Dillon with her mom while Coach Taylor lives in Austin, falling apart. Julie's problems at home, coupled with a crush on her older co-worker, cause her to break up with Matt. After some time, Julie attempts to reconcile. At first, Matt is receptive, but he eventually refuses, saying that he will feel like a chump if he takes her back. Matt begins dating the new cheerleader at school. Matt's friendship with Smash also begins falling apart. Matt believes that Smash, now a heavily-recruited senior, no longer cares about the team and cares only about himself and his college prospects. The two get into a fight after the first game of the season and continue fighting until Coach Taylor, back from his stint at TMU, benches them until they can get their act together. Thanks to a pep-talk from Landry, they quickly realize that they are fighting for nothing and become friends again.

Problems at home force Matt to get an at-home nurse named Carlotta for his grandmother. At first, neither Matt nor his grandmother like Carlotta very much, but they soon begin to welcome her into their home. Matt develops feelings for Carlotta and breaks up with his cheerleader girlfriend so he can be with Carlotta. She rebuffs him at first, but gives in eventually and she and Matt have sex. Their relationship does not last long, as Carlotta leaves the Saracen house to return to her family in Guatemala.

Tired of everything he has gone through, Matt begins skipping school and practice so he can get drunk with Tim. A night at the strip club with Tim ends early when Matt's grandmother has an accident at home and is taken to the hospital. Matt passes out waiting for his grandmother to be released, which forces Coach Taylor to drive them both home. A furious Coach throws Matt into a cold shower and berates him before Matt breaks down, asking Coach what is wrong with him that everyone in his life leaves him for something better. Coach responds by telling Matt that there is nothing wrong with him at all. Matt shapes up afterwards.

=== Season 3 ===
Season 3 begins almost a year after the conclusion of Season 2. New freshman quarterback, J.D. McCoy, who has just moved to Dillon, threatens Matt's position on the team. While Matt is still playing well, the new quarterback's skills, along with public pressure, force Coach Taylor to give J.D. the starting position. Matt, furious, threatens to quit before Coach talks him out of it. Matt agrees to stay on the team and sit on the bench, though he eventually convinces Coach to allow him to play wide receiver. Matt's final game as a Panther sees him return to the quarterback position in the second half of the state championship game after J.D.'s poor performance. After being held scoreless in the first half, the Panthers take the lead due to Matt's strong play, but they lose on the final possession when the other team kicks a field goal.

During the season, Matt slowly begins reconnecting with his mother, whom he sets out to find to become an emancipated minor and take care of his grandmother's medical issues. After learning about Matt's problems, his mother comes to Dillon hoping that Matt will allow her to help out at home even if he does not forgive her for leaving when he was a child. Matt also begins dating Julie again after a day spent together at the lake. Coach Taylor once again is not too pleased, especially after catching Julie in bed with Matt.

Matt's college prospects also come into play. He will not be playing football anywhere after being benched as a senior. He once confides to his mother after being benched that he never wanted to play in college and felt undeserving to be starting quarterback at all, given the circumstances leading to him becoming "QB1". Matt looks at different art schools before deciding on the School of the Art Institute of Chicago. (Note: Actor Zach Gilford is from Evanston, Illinois, a suburb of Chicago) Knowing he will be away from home, he helps his grandmother move into an assisted living home. In the end, Matt changes his mind, unable to leave his grandmother, the only person who has stayed by his side all of his life.

=== Season 4 ===
Season 4 marks a transition for Matt Saracen, and the departure of his character in a leading role as the show shifts its focus to other characters. As the season begins, Matt is a pizza delivery driver attending community college. He begins to realize that his past in Dillon is holding him back, finally admitting this on a hunting trip with Tim Riggins. Upon hearing the news that his father was killed in action in the war, a devastated Matt attempts to make sense of his life. After military compensation for his father's death (along with life insurance) is enough for his grandma to live comfortably, Matt abruptly leaves for Chicago to finally attend the School of the Art Institute of Chicago—without telling either Julie or Landry. Matt eventually calls her to offer an apology, but she refuses to accept it. Matt returns to Dillon for Thanksgiving, hoping to finally make amends. He tells Julie that if he did not leave when he did, he may have never left. He still, however, wishes to be with her and has already bought her a plane ticket back to Chicago. Julie still cares for Matt and wants to go with him, but she declines, saying that upending her life to follow him to Chicago will prevent her from pursuing her own dreams. Matt recognizes she is right, and the two amicably go their separate ways. Matt also apologizes to Landry and reconnects with him by giving him the ticket to Chicago.

=== Season 5 ===
Julie visits Matt in Chicago on her way back to college after an incident with her History TA. Even though Julie says that she does not fit in Matt's life anymore, the two quickly resume their relationship. Before Julie leaves, Matt tells her that they will figure out a way to make things work. Matt surprises Julie and his grandmother by returning home for Christmas. He tells Julie that he wants to be with her forever and proposes in front of the Alamo Freeze. Despite worries from Coach Taylor and Tami, the young couple convinces them that they are making the right choice. In the final moments of the series, which take place eight months later, the two are shown happily married and living in Chicago.
