= Tami Taylor =

- Friday Night Lights character
- First appearance: "Pilot"
- Last appearance: "Always"
- Created by: Peter Berg
- Portrayed by: Connie Britton

In-universe information
- Occupation: Dillon High School Guidance Counselor (Seasons 1–2); Dillon High School Principal (Seasons 3–4); East Dillon High School Guidance Couselor (Season 5); Current Braemore College Dean of Admissions
- Family: Shelley Hayes (sister); Matt Saracen (son-in-law)
- Spouse: Eric Taylor
- Children: Julie Taylor (daughter); Gracie Taylor (daughter)

Tami Taylor is a fictional character on the NBC/DirecTV (The 101 Network) drama Friday Night Lights; played by Connie Britton. She is the wife of the show's main character, high school football coach Eric Taylor.

== Characterization and background ==
Tami is the wife of Eric Taylor, mother of Julie and Gracie Taylor, and a guidance counselor at Dillon High, who often acts as the voice of reason to her husband. As "Mrs. Coach" and the school guidance counselor, she is a maternal figure who is often sought out by the main characters (high school students) for advice. Tami, by her own admission, was a "bit of a wild child back in the day" and nearly dropped out of high school before meeting her future husband. Little is known about her side of the family, except that she has a sister named Shelley.

== Storylines ==
Tami does not initially approve of Julie's friendship with Tyra Collette, due to Tyra's bad record at school and her older sister being a stripper, but changes her mind when she sees Tyra taking care of her drunk mother. She also becomes a mentor to Tyra, giving Tyra the confidence she needs to help her succeed in life and go on to college. When Coach Taylor receives a coaching job offer at the fictional Texas Methodist University (T.M.U.), Tami is indecisive about whether the family should go to Austin. She later tells Coach Taylor that he should move to Austin, while the rest of the family stays behind in Dillon. Season 2 sees Tami become a mother again to Gracie. In Season 3, Tami becomes the Principal of Dillon High. During season 4, she is sought out by Becky Sproles for advice about her unexpected pregnancy, but later receives negative backlash when Becky has an abortion. Instead of issuing a public apology like the school board suggests, Tami decides to leave her position to become the Guidance Counselor at East Dillon High. Tami makes a career breakthrough in season 5 when she accepts the Dean of Admissions position at fictional Braemore College in Philadelphia.

== Reception ==
Connie Britton's portrayal of Tami Taylor has earned her critical acclaim, two Television Critics Association Award nominations for Individual Achievement in Drama in 2007 and 2008, and two Primetime Emmy Award nominations for Outstanding Lead Actress in a Drama Series in 2010 and 2011.

The critical response to the character of Tami has been strong, with many critics citing Britton's performance and chemistry with co-star Kyle Chandler who portrays her husband Eric Taylor as one of the main reasons for the show's success. Tami's relationship with Eric was included in AOL TV's list of the "Best TV Couples of All Time" and in the same list by TV Guide. Judy Berman of Flavorwire put the couple in her list of the best TV characters of 2011, explaining: "Friday Night Lights's Eric and Tami Taylor have often been called the most realistic depiction of a strong marriage on television, and we agree with that assessment. Deeply good people who are imperfect enough to never seem saccharine, they have major disagreements and relationship-changing conflicts but value each other and their marriage enough to work them out." Slate magazine also named the character as one of the reasons they were looking forward to the return of the show in the 2007–2008 TV Season. AOL TV named her the 17th Most Memorable Female TV Character.
