= Dora Madison Burge =

American actress

- Born: October 17, 1991 (age 35); Hutto, Texas, U.S.
- Other names: Madison Burge, Dora Madison
- Occupation: Actress
- Years active: 2005–present

Dora Madison Burge, sometimes credited professionally as Madison Burge and Dora Madison, is an American actress. She is known for starring as Becky Sproles on the NBC/DirecTV drama Friday Night Lights from 2009 to 2011. She starred as Jessica "Chilli" Chilton on the NBC drama Chicago Fire from 2015 to 2016.

== Personal life ==
Burge was born in Hutto, Texas, as the youngest of six children. She attended Round Rock Christian Academy and was accepted to the University of North Texas, but deferred to pursue an acting career.

== Career ==
After appearing in a number of short films, in 2009, Burge made her television debut as Becky Sproles in the NBC/DirecTV drama Friday Night Lights in the fourth season until the show ended with the fifth season in 2011. According to a local interview, Burge said prior to being cast, she did not watch the show, but that did not limit her abilities when auditioning for the part as she was "so right on" for the role.

In 2011, Burge appeared in the religious sports drama Seven Days in Utopia, and appeared as Lexi Samuels in three episodes of the first season of the ABC Family drama The Lying Game.

Also in 2011, Burge appeared in the horror comedy Humans vs Zombies, based on the live action role-playing game.

In 2012, Burge appeared in the family movie Cowgirls 'n Angels and actually performed some of the stunts on horseback.

In 2013, she appeared in another family movie My Dog Champion.

In 2013, Burge appeared in My Jerusalem's music video "Mono". She also had a recurring role in the eighth and final season of the Showtime crime drama Dexter as Niki Walters, the daughter of Vince Masuka (C. S. Lee).

In 2014, Burge had a recurring role as Zoe in seven episodes of the short-lived CW science fiction romantic drama Star-Crossed, which starred her former Friday Night Lights co-stars Aimee Teegarden and Grey Damon. That same year, she played Dora in the Sasquatch horror film Exists directed by Eduardo Sánchez.

In 2015, Burge joined the cast of the NBC drama Chicago Fire (replacing Charlie Barnett who played Peter Mills) as Jessica "Chili" Chilton, the paramedic in charge in the third season. Burge was added to the main cast in the fourth season. In 2016, her character was written out of the show.

In 2017, she co-starred with James Van Der Beek as Karen in the short-lived Viceland sitcom What Would Diplo Do?.

== Filmography ==
Film roles
Year	Title	Role	Notes
2005	Dear Viddy	Hasna	Short film
2006	Jumping Off Bridges	Student	
2007	The Substitute	Student	Short film
2007	Trick or Treat	Teen Girl #1	Short film
2009	Wasting Away		
2009	One More Chance		Short film
2011	The Man Who Never Cried	Janie	Short film
2011	Seven Days in Utopia	Luke's Sister	
2011	Humans vs. Zombies	Tommi	
2012	Cowgirls 'n Angels	Kansas	
2013	Formosa TX	Mina	Short film
2013	My Dog the Champion	Madison	
2014	Exists	Dora	
2014	Lily and Lucille's Hip Creature	Emily Caruso	Short film
2014	The Loft	Zoe Trauner	
2015	Erased		Short film, voice role
2015	Divine Access	Amber	
2016	Everybody Wants Some!!	Val	
2016	Chee and T	Franco	
2017	Song to Song	Denise	
2017	Night of the Babysitter	The Babysitter	
2017	The Honor Farm	Laila	
2017	Stars Are Already Dead	Law	
2019	Bliss	Dezzy	
2019	VFW	Gutter	
2022	Christmas Bloody Christmas	Lahna	
2023	Big Boys	Allie	

Television roles
Year	Title	Role	Notes
2009–2011	Friday Night Lights	Becky Sproles	Series regular, 26 episodes Recurring cast (season 4); Main cast (season 5)
2011	The Lying Game	Lexi Samuels	Recurring role, 3 episodes
2012	Southland	Tracy Haywood	Episode: "Thursday"
2013	Dexter	Niki Walters	Recurring role, 8 episodes
2013	Ironside		Episode: "Uptown Murders"
2014	Star-Crossed	Zoe	Recurring role, 7 episodes
2014	Chicago P.D.	Alissa Martin/Jellybean Chilton*	Episode: "Call It Macaroni"
2014	NCIS: New Orleans	Tilda	Episode: "The Recruits"
2015–16	Chicago Fire	Jessica “Chili” Chilton*	Series regular, 17 episodes Recurring cast (season 3); Main cast (season 4)
2015–16	Chicago Med	Jessica “Chili” Chilton*	Recurring role, 2 episodes
2017	What Would Diplo Do?	Karen	Series regular, 5 episodes
2019	Into the Dark	Marissa	Episode: "All That We Destroy"
