= On the Outside Looking In (Friday Night Lights) =

- Friday Night Lights episode
- Episode no.: Season 5 Episode 2
- Directed by: Michael Waxman
- Written by: Kerry Ehrin
- Cinematography by: Todd McMullen
- Editing by: Stephen Michael
- Original release dates: November 3, 2010 (DirecTV); April 22, 2011 (NBC)
- Running time: 43 minutes

Guest appearances
- Brad Leland as Buddy Garrity; Derek Phillips as Billy Riggins; Gil McKinney as Derek Bishop; Emily Rios as Epyck Sanders

Episode chronology
← Previous "Expectations"	Next → "The Right Hand of the Father"
- Friday Night Lights (season 5)

"On the Outside Looking In" is the second episode of the fifth season of the American sports drama television series Friday Night Lights, inspired by the 1990 nonfiction book by H. G. Bissinger. It is the 65th overall episode of the series and was written by consulting producer Kerry Ehrin, and directed by producer Michael Waxman. It originally aired on DirecTV's 101 Network on November 3, 2010, before airing on NBC on April 22, 2011.

The series is set in the fictional town of Dillon, a small, close-knit community in rural West Texas. It follows a high school football team, the Dillon Panthers. It features a set of characters, primarily connected to Coach Eric Taylor, his wife Tami, and their daughter Julie. In the episode, the Lions' victory is questioned for safety measures. Meanwhile, Julie starts college, and Vince and Jess get into conflicts over their lives.

According to Nielsen Media Research, the episode was seen by an estimated 3.38 million household viewers and gained a 0.9/3 ratings share among adults aged 18–49. The episode received critical acclaim, who praised the performances and character development.

== Plot ==
The Lions' victory in the first game attracts interest in the media, with many questioning if it could surprise during the state championship. Tami (Connie Britton) tries to get rebellious teenager Epyck Sanders (Emily Rios) to attend counseling, but she refuses. Eric (Kyle Chandler) shows some letters of intent from various colleges to Vince (Michael B. Jordan), surprising him.

As part of the football season, "rally girls" are selected for each player. Jess (Jurnee Smollett) is chosen as Vince's rally girl, but she makes it clear she won't be as aggressive as the other girls. However, Jess is taken aback as her rival, Mara, intends to steal Vince from her. Eric is informed that the game is being investigated over safety measures, and that Luke (Matt Lauria) could be suspended for the hit he took on the quarterback during the first game. He meets with the committee to explain the measures taken, but remains firm that nothing illegal happened in the game. Despite this, Luke is suspended for the following game.

Wanting to help Epyck, Tami suggests forming an after-school tuition program with the other teachers, who are not enthusiastic about the idea. To get close to them, she hangs out with them at a restaurant, but they continue not taking her seriously. At Burleson College, Julie (Aimee Teegarden) struggles in fitting in with the study groups. She attends a college party, where she joins the head TA Derek Bishop (Gil McKinney) over a football game.

Becky (Madison Burge) helps Billy (Derek Phillips) and Mindy (Stacey Oristano) at the house, but Mindy is annoyed by her presence and choices of outfits, despite Billy asking her in giving her a chance as he promised Tim to look out for her. Becky, Luke, Vince and Jess attend a party with the team, but the party takes a bad turn when Jess' jealousy over Mara causes her to engage in heavy drinking, causing her to vomit. Jess finally admits her concerns to Vince, who consoles and reassures her. Becky drives Luke home, where he tells her that he has chosen her as his rally girl, delighting her. She returns home, where she is scolded by Mindy for not telling them where she was at night.

Epyck decides to begin counseling with Tami. Derek apologizes to Julie over a previous conversation, and they agree to continue hanging out. As the Lions prepare for their next game, Eric writes the word "state" on a chalkboard, inspiring the team as they leave for the game.

== Production ==
=== Development ===
The episode was written by consulting producer Kerry Ehrin, and directed by producer Michael Waxman. This was Ehrin's eleventh writing credit, and Waxman's ninth directing credit.

== Reception ==
=== Viewers ===
In its original American broadcast on NBC, "On the Outside Looking In" was seen by an estimated 3.38 million household viewers with a 0.9/3 in the 18–49 demographics. This means that 0.9 percent of all households with televisions watched the episode, while 3 percent of all of those watching television at the time of the broadcast watched it. This was a 6% decrease in viewership from the previous episode, which was watched by an estimated 3.57 million household viewers with a 0.9/3 in the 18–49 demographics.

=== Critical reviews ===
"On the Outside Looking In" received critical acclaim. Eric Goldman of IGN gave the episode a "great" 8 out of 10 and wrote, "This very solid episode took another look at the specific side of the football culture that includes the rally girl – a topic early on in the series that had been ignored for awhile."

Keith Phipps of The A.V. Club gave the episode an "A" grade and wrote, "I now realize that I overrated last week's episode. Not that it was a bad episode. It wasn't. It was probably even a necessary episode, bringing everyone up to speed on where everyone is and what they've been up to since last we saw them. But, man, this week's episode made me realize I'd forgotten just how great this show could be."

Alan Sepinwall of HitFix wrote, "With last year's shift to East Dillon, FNL has become an outsider's story, and that's rarely been more overt than in an episode like this, with one story after another about characters who embody the title “On the Outside Looking In.”" Ken Tucker of Entertainment Weekly wrote, "For anyone who thinks there’s not enough football in Friday Night Lights, this week's episode, titled 'On The Outside Looking In,' had enough for a full season, as far as I was concerned. That's because I'm one of those FNL fans who has no interest in football, so I usually just appreciate the quick cutting during the games and the helpful sportscaster-voiceovers telling me who's winning and losing."

Andy Greenwald of Vulture wrote, "Sometimes it's about putting your head down and pushing the plot forward. Thus week two of this young season was a low-scoring, low-key contest. The offense spread the ball around to a lot of different characters without too much forward progress. But there's plenty of time left on the clock." Alison Winn Scotch of Paste wrote, "There are many incredible things about Friday Night Lights. You'll no doubt read all about them throughout my recaps this season. But what struck me while watching this episode is that the writers have pulled off the unthinkable: unlike nearly any other TV series set during high school, the show has seamlessly transitioned the cast while making me care just as much about this second string as I did the first. In fact, with my tear count ratcheting up even higher than last episode, I'd say that I'm almost as invested in the lives of Vince and Luke as I was in the lives of Riggins and Saracen. And that's saying a lot. A lot."

Todd Martens of Los Angeles Times wrote, "There are plenty of standard TV issues handled in Friday Night Lights. You've got your mother-daughter fights, your teenage pregnancy and, of course, your mysterious bad girl who smokes cigarettes in the bathroom. Yet the series, set in the fictional town of Dillon, Texas, largely has skirted clichés." Leigh Raines of TV Fanatic gave the episode a 4 star out of 5 rating and wrote, "Does their budding, yet forbidden relationship remind anyone else of "the Swede" from season two? Well don't get too down in the dumps over the rankings and suspension, because Coach Taylor and I both have just one word for you. State." Television Without Pity gave the episode an "A–" grade.
