= Friday Night Lights season 5 =

Friday Night Lights
- Season 5
- Season 5 DVD cover
- No. of episodes: 13

Release
- Original network: The 101 Network (first run); NBC (network)
- Original release: October 27, 2010 – February 9, 2011

Season chronology
- ← Previous; Season 4

The fifth and final season of the American serial drama television series Friday Night Lights commenced airing in the United States on October 27, 2010. It is the third season to be aired on DirecTV's The 101 Network. The 13-episode season concluded on The 101 Network on February 9, 2011. The fifth season began airing on NBC on April 15, 2011, and concluded on July 15, 2011. The fifth season was released on DVD in region 1 on April 5, 2011.

== Cast ==
=== Main cast ===
- Kyle Chandler as Eric Taylor
- Connie Britton as Tami Taylor
- Aimee Teegarden as Julie Taylor
- Michael B. Jordan as Vince Howard
- Matt Lauria as Luke Cafferty
- Jurnee Smollett as Jess Merriweather
- Madison Burge as Becky Sproles
- Grey Damon as Hastings Ruckle

=== Recurring cast ===
- Brad Leland as Buddy Garrity
- LaMarcus Tinker as Dallas Tinker
- Taylor Kitsch as Tim Riggins
- Scott Porter as Jason Street
- Joey Truty as Buddy Garrity Jr.
- Zach Gilford as Matt Saracen
- Emily Rios as Epyck Sanders
- Gil McKinney as Derek Bishop
- Jesse Plemons as Landry Clarke
- Derek Phillips as Billy Riggins
- Stacey Oristano as Mindy Collette
- Cress Williams as Ornette Howard
- Angela Rawna as Regina Howard
- Adrianne Palicki as Tyra Collette
- Dana Wheeler-Nicholson as Angela Collette
- Louanne Stephens as Lorraine Saracen
- Denise Williamson as Maura Friedman

== Production ==
The season was produced by Brian Grazer's Imagine Television company, Peter Berg's Film 44 company and Universal Media Studios and filmed in Pflugerville, Texas.

== Fictional game results ==
Fictional game results
Opponent	Result	Score	Record	Episode No.	Episode
Regular season
Croft Cowboys	Win	29–28^{[a]}	1–0	1	"Expectations"
Laribee Lions	Win	31–24^{[b]}	2–0	2–3	"On the Outside Looking In" / "The Right Hand of the Father"
Royal Rock Dragons	Win	34–28	3–0	3	"The Right Hand of the Father"
South King Rangers	Win	38–17	4–0	5	"Kingdom"
South Milbank Rattlers	Win	28–10^{[c]}	5–0	6	"Swerve"
Dillon Panthers	Win	37–7	6–0	7	"Perfect Record"
West Cambria Mustangs	Loss	17–28^{[d]}	6–1	9	"Gut Check"
Fort Hood Cougars	Win	19–17	7–1	9	"Gut Check"
Northfield Cubs	Win	28-12^{[e]}	8–1	10	"Don't Go"
Area playoffs
West Cambria Mustangs	Win	38–6	9–1	11	"The March"
Regional playoffs
Bellemeade	Win	30-14	10–1	11	"The March"
State quarter-finals
Preston Pirates	Win	unknown^{[f]}	11–1	11	"The March"
State semi-finals
Arnett-Mead Tigers	Win	15–13	12–1	11	"The March"
State championship
Hudgins Hawks	Win	27–26^{[g]}	13–1	13	"Always"

^{a} The final score was clearly 29–28 at the end of the episode "Expectations", but at the beginning of the episode "The Right Hand of the Father", the Cowboys game ball reads 22–21.
^{b} The game was played toward the end of the episode "On the Outside Looking In", but no game footage was shown. The final score was printed on a game ball at Buddy's Bar & Grill at the beginning of the episode "The Right Hand of the Father".
^{c} The game was never shown, but Buddy Garrity announced the score before putting the game ball up at Buddy's Bar & Grill.
^{d} The final score was shown on the scoreboard, and game footage was shown in flashbacks. However, the reporter in "The March" claims that Arnett-Mead, not West Cambria was the only team to beat the East Dillion Lions that year.
^{e} The final score was never mentioned.
^{f} The final score was never mentioned.
^{g} The final score was never mentioned, but the epilogue shows Vince and other team members with a championship ring, and the Lions were down by five points with only three seconds left.

== Episodes ==
No. overall	No. in season	Title	Directed by	Written by	Original release date	U.S. viewers (millions)
64	1	"Expectations"	Michael Waxman	David Hudgins	October 27, 2010 (DirectTV); April 15, 2011 (NBC)	3.57
Coach Taylor tempers high expectations for East Dillon's impending season as Tami becomes frustrated in her new job. Vince and Luke work to recruit a new player for the Lions' squad and Dillon bids farewell to two alumni as they prepare to leave for college.
65	2	"On the Outside Looking In"	Michael Waxman	Kerry Ehrin	November 3, 2010 (DirectTV); April 22, 2011 (NBC)	3.38
Eric realizes that not everyone is satisfied by the Lions' performance in the first game. Vince receives unexpected benefits as a football player. Luke's aggression has repercussions.
66	3	"The Right Hand of the Father"	David Boyd	Patrick Massett & John Zinman	November 10, 2010 (DirectTV); April 29, 2011 (NBC)	2.99
Someone from Vince's past resurfaces. Julie connects with a faculty member. Eric tries to instill discipline in the team. Buddy is troubled after learning something about his son.
67	4	"Keep Looking"	Todd McMullen	Bridget Carpenter	November 17, 2010 (DirectTV); May 6, 2011 (NBC)	2.82
Coach is forced to play mediator as tensions erupt in the locker room. Luke gets recruited. Buddy deals with the trials and tribulations of fatherhood. Tami deals with a troubled student. The Lions welcome a new player.
68	5	"Kingdom"	Patrick Norris	Rolin Jones	December 1, 2010 (DirectTV); May 13, 2011 (NBC)	2.88
Coach discusses recruitment regulations. The Lions take a road trip. East Dillon's four stars make a pact. Julie's relationship becomes more complicated.
69	6	"Swerve"	Jonas Pate	Ron Fitzgerald	December 8, 2010 (DirectTV); May 20, 2011 (NBC)	3.34
A popular magazine hails Coach as the "Kingmaker." Vince's past catches up to him. Luke reacts to the truth. A suspicious accident delays Julie's return to college.
70	7	"Perfect Record"	Adam Davidson	Etan Frankel & Derek Santos Olson	December 15, 2010 (DirectTV); May 27, 2011 (NBC)	2.92
Rivalry week stirs up controversy and the return of a familiar face. Vince is caught in the middle between Coach and his father Ornette. Billy takes Luke under his wing.
71	8	"Fracture"	Allison Liddi-Brown	Monica Henderson	January 5, 2011 (DirectTV); June 3, 2011 (NBC)	2.91
Coach fears he's beginning to lose his grip on the team. Tami worries that one of her students is being neglected. Vince alienates his teammates. Becky enters a beauty pageant.
72	9	"Gut Check"	Chris Eyre	David Hudgins	January 12, 2011 (DirectTV); June 17, 2011 (NBC)	3.07
Due to his behavior, Coach threatens to suspend Vince. Luke faces pressure. Billy learns some surprising news from Mindy. Becky starts a surprising new job.
73	10	"Don't Go"	Michael Waxman	Bridget Carpenter	January 19, 2011 (DirectTV); June 24, 2011 (NBC)	2.82
An elite college football program attempts to lure Coach away from East Dillon. After realizing how selfish he has been, Vince vows to earn his spot back, even if it means he has to work his way back to win Coach's trust again. Friends and family speak at Tim's parole hearing. East Dillon holds a Fall Sports Banquet.
74	11	"The March"	Jason Katims	Rolin Jones	January 26, 2011 (DirectTV); July 1, 2011 (NBC)	2.45
Budget cuts threaten the team's status as they fight towards going to state. Tim has trouble adjusting to the home life he left behind. Vince's father shows his true colors. Tami gets a new job opportunity.
75	12	"Texas Whatever"	Kyle Chandler	Kerry Ehrin	February 2, 2011 (DirectTV); July 8, 2011 (NBC)	3.01
The School Board reaches a decision about the future of Dillon football. An old friend helps Tim find his way. Jess and Vince reunite. Tami and Eric face a tough decision about their future.
76	13	"Always"	Michael Waxman	Jason Katims	February 9, 2011 (DirectTV); July 15, 2011 (NBC)	3.18
With the decision to close the East Dillon Football program speculation runs wild on two fronts. Will the Lions be able to win State by beating the Hudgins Hawks and go out in a blaze of glory; and will Coach Taylor agree to return to coach the Dillon Panthers and a super team with the best of both schools? Tami's PA job offer adds conflict in the Taylor home as does a new development with Matt and Julie. Meanwhile Tim Riggins and Tyra talk seriously about their futures and Luke and Becky clear the air.

== Series finale ==
=== Reception ===
TVLine's Michael Ausiello said after watching the finale that "One of the best dramas in the history of TV is over..."

Ken Tucker from Entertainment Weekly wrote "...that was one fine, emotional, intelligent, and satisfying ending... Watching the final episode, I came once again to the conclusion that this was the best portrait of a marriage I’ve ever seen on television." The A.V. Club gave the episode an "A" rating, stating "...what made Friday Night Lights such an appealing show is the way it captured the joys of life in a small, football-obsessed town. Most of those joys stemmed from the relationships the characters forged there, all of them related, directly or otherwise, to football. Some of them were quite unexpected".

TV Guide named the series finale "Always" the best TV episode of 2011. Time magazine's James Poniewozik included it in his Top 10 TV Episodes of 2011. He said, "Bracing for a great series to produce its final episode can be like watching an egg-on-a-spoon race: you tense up, hoping your player doesn't drop it at the last moment. FNL kept the egg intact, finishing up five seasons with a finale that gave closure to a vast number of Texas stories while giving poetic voice to its values of community and selflessness" and concluded "To the end, the heart of this American classic was not whether you win or lose but how you play the game". BuddyTV also listed it as the best TV episode of 2011.

=== Deleted scenes ===
A speech by Coach Taylor playing over the final montage was cut, as Jason Katims wanted the montage to be all about the small moments coming into one.

Scott Porter asked Katims while filming the scene where Tim and Billy are building the house, to include his character Jason Street. The scene was filmed, for the experience of the scene, Katims says, but was never intended to be included in the episode.

== Reception ==
=== Critical response ===
On Rotten Tomatoes, the season has an approval rating of 100% with an average score of 8.8 out of 10 based on 28 reviews. The website's critical consensus reads, "Friday Night Lights delivers a triumphant final season, remaining true to its characters while continuing to dispense more of the absorbing drama that made it a cult favorite throughout its run." On the review aggregator website Metacritic, the fifth season scored 82 out of 100, based on 10 reviews, indicating "Universal acclaim".

=== Accolades ===
==== American Cinema Editors "Eddie" Award ====
- Best Edited One-Hour Series for Commercial Television, Angela M. Catanzaro for "Always" (Nominated)

==== Directors Guild of America Award ====
- Outstanding Directing – Drama Series, Michael Waxman for "Always" (Nominated)

==== Humanitas Prize ====
- 60 Minute Category, Jason Katims for "Always" (Won)

==== NAMIC Vision Award ====
- Best Drama Series (Nominated)

==== Primetime Emmy Awards ====
- Outstanding Drama Series (Nominated)
- Outstanding Lead Actor in a Drama Series, Kyle Chandler (Won)
- Outstanding Lead Actress in a Drama Series, Connie Britton (Nominated)
- Outstanding Writing for a Drama Series, Jason Katims for "Always" (Won)

==== Satellite Awards ====
- Best Television Series – Drama (Nominated)
- Best Actor – Television Series: Drama, Kyle Chandler (Nominated)
- Best Actress – Television Series: Drama, Connie Britton (Nominated)

==== Screen Actors Guild Award ====
- Outstanding Performance by a Male Actor in a Drama Series, Kyle Chandler (Nominated)

==== Television Critics Association Awards ====
- Program of the Year (Won)
- Outstanding Achievement in Drama (Nominated)

== Possible film ==
In July 2011, it was revealed that executive producer Peter Berg was interested in continuing the series, as a feature film. In August 2011, Berg said at a Television Critics Association panel that the Friday Night Lights film is in development. Berg was quoted as saying "We're very serious about trying to do it", adding that the script is currently being written. Universal Pictures and Imagine Television would produce the film, with Kyle Chandler and Connie Britton set to return. In May 2013, executive producer Brian Grazer confirmed the continued development to make a film. In December 2013, it was confirmed by Berg that a film would not be moving forward.
