= Always (Friday Night Lights) =

- Friday Night Lights episode
- Episode no.: Season 5 Episode 13
- Directed by: Michael Waxman
- Written by: Jason Katims
- Cinematography by: Todd McMullen
- Editing by: Angela M. Catanzaro
- Original release date: February 9, 2011
- Running time: 61 minutes

Guest appearances
- Zach Gilford as Matt Saracen; Taylor Kitsch as Tim Riggins; Adrianne Palicki as Tyra Collette; Jesse Plemons as Landry Clarke; Brad Leland as Buddy Garrity; Derek Phillips as Billy Riggins; Dana Wheeler-Nicholson as Angela Collette; Alicia Witt as Cheryl Sproles; Cress Williams as Ornette Howard; Lorraine Toussaint as Birdie "Bird" Merriweather

Episode chronology
← Previous "Texas Whatever"	Next → —
- Friday Night Lights (season 5)

"Always" is the series finale of the American sports drama television series Friday Night Lights, inspired by the 1990 nonfiction book by H. G. Bissinger. It is the thirteenth episode of the fifth season and the 76th overall episode of the series. The episode was written by executive producer Jason Katims, and directed by producer Michael Waxman. It originally aired on DirecTV's 101 Network on February 9, 2011, before airing on NBC on July 15, 2011.

The series is set in the fictional town of Dillon, a small, close-knit community in rural West Texas. It follows a high school football team, the Dillon Panthers. It features a set of characters, primarily connected to Coach Eric Taylor, his wife Tami, and their daughter Julie. The series followed Eric's journey as a coach, which involved his move as the new coach for the East Dillon Lions, a team that struggled in their first football season. The season follows the Lions' journey for the State Championship title, while the future of the team was put in jeopardy after the closure of the football program. In the final episode, the Lions prepare for the final game, while the characters prepare for the next chapter of their lives. With a runtime of 61 minutes, it is the longest episode in the series.

According to Nielsen Media Research, the episode was seen by an estimated 3.18 million household viewers and gained a 0.8/3 ratings share among adults aged 18–49. The episode was widely praised by critics for its performances, closure, writing, directing, production values and emotional tone. For the finale, Kyle Chandler won Outstanding Lead Actor in a Drama Series, while Jason Katims won Outstanding Writing for a Drama Series at the 63rd Primetime Emmy Awards. It is considered by many to be one of the best series finales in TV history.

== Plot ==
With the Texas High School State Championship coming up, the Lions are interviewed over their future, but they choose to ignore the questions. With Christmas approaching, Matt (Zach Gilford) surprises the Taylors by arriving at their home. Later, he proposes to Julie (Aimee Teegarden), who happily accepts. However, learning that he didn't ask Eric (Kyle Chandler) for his blessing, Julie tells him to ask him.

After talking with Landry (Jesse Plemons), Matt asks Eric for his blessing. Eric angrily objects, and Matt proclaims that they are moving forward with the wedding anyway since Julie already said yes. Eric and Tami (Connie Britton) have dinner with Matt and Julie, telling them they should not rush a wedding as they are still young. However, Matt and Julie state that they believe in their future, looking up to Eric and Tami as role models of a successful marriage, which causes Tami, hit by their words due to the current tension between her and Eric, to leave the restaurant crying. Later, Tami tells Eric that she has decided to pass on the Braemore position, just as Eric is asked to sign a contract to become the Panthers' head coach before the State championship game.

When Cheryl (Alicia Witt) returns, Becky (Madison Burge) bids farewell to Billy (Derek Phillips) and Mindy (Stacey Oristano), thanking them for giving her a home, and then moves back with her mother. She is visited by Luke (Matt Lauria), who apologizes for his recent behaviour and proclaims his love for her, prompting the two to reconcile. Vince (Michael B. Jordan) invites Ornette (Cress Williams) to the game, but he is very dismissive. Eric approaches Ornette with the tickets, telling him his son is making history and he needs to be present. Jess (Jurnee Smollett) finds out that her father has successfully expanded the BBQ franchise to Dallas and that they will be moving there to be closer to him. She goes to thank Eric for the opportunity he gave her. Eric tells her he will recommend her in Dallas to help her get hired by a new team, while Vince finally admits he is happy she is part of the team as he proclaims his love for her.

Tim and Tyra (Adrianne Palicki) go to the open field together. Tyra admits that she always loved Tim but has big plans for her future which she has no intention of giving up on for him while Tim states that he will stay living in Dillon and that he is determined to get his life together. They simply agree that maybe one day their paths could reunite. Before the game, Eric tells Tami that he has chosen to decline the contract, feeling it is time to allow her in deciding their future and thus wanting her to accept the job and for them to move to Philadelphia together. They share a kiss. The Lions leave for the Cotton Bowl, where they face the Hudgins Hawks. With 3 seconds left, the Lions are losing 26-21 and Eric instructs Vince in making a 60-yard Hail Mary pass. As Vince throws it, the scene ends.

Eight months later, Eric is now coaching the Pemberton Pioneers high school football team in Philadelphia, while Tami is happy with her new job at Braemore. Most of the Lions team members (including Billy and the coaching staff) are now part of the Panthers, revealing that they won the state championship game. Luke enlists in the army and kisses Becky goodbye, giving her his championship ring as he departs. Matt and Julie are now living happily together in Chicago. Jess has become a coach for the Dallas Walker Spartans team. Buddy (Brad Leland) has a sign mounted in the Panthers' locker room that reads their motto "Clear eyes. Full hearts. Can't lose!". Tim is building a house in the open field, with Billy's help, and both proclaim "Texas forever." At night, Eric assembles the Pioneers, telling them he is looking forward to coaching them and instructing them to prepare for practice the following morning. Tami arrives and they share a kiss as they prepare to go home. While they walk off the field, the lights turn off.

== Production ==
=== Development ===
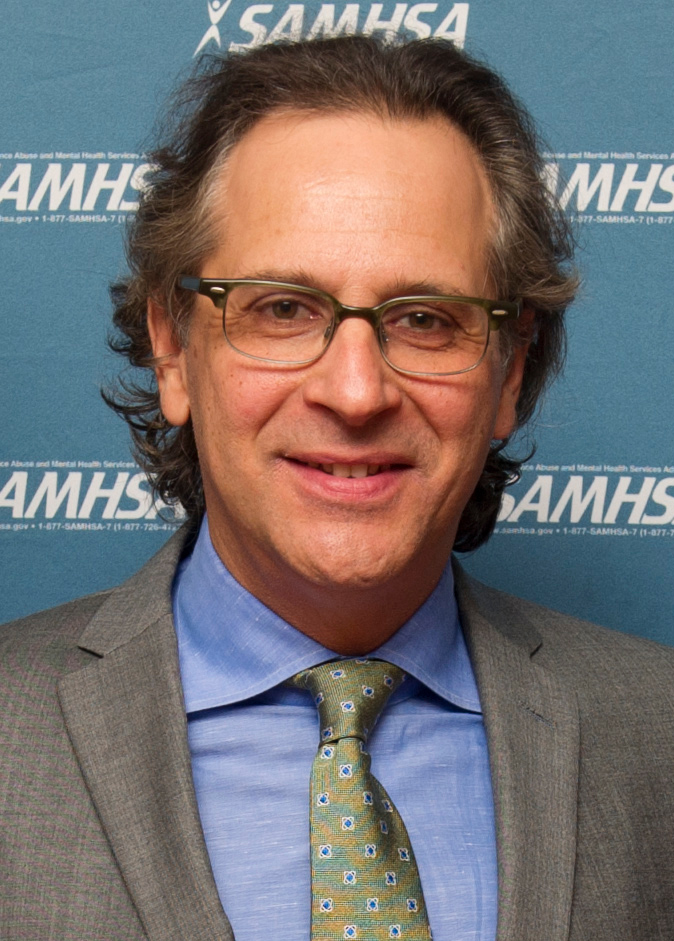
Showrunner and executive producer Jason Katims wrote the episode, for which he won the Primetime Emmy Award for Outstanding Writing for a Drama Series.

In March 2009, NBC announced that the series would be renewed for a fifth season. In August 2010, it was confirmed that the fifth season would be the series' final season. Jason Katims commented, "Going into season five, knowing it would likely be the final season, everyone involved with the show turned our focus to trying to make the best possible thirteen episodes we could. It was moving to watch the writers, cast, producers, directors and everyone on the team pull together like that. We wanted a great ending. We wanted to leave it all on the field."

The episode was written by executive producer Jason Katims, and directed by producer Michael Waxman. This was Katims' tenth writing credit, and Waxman's eleventh directing credit.

=== Writing ===
Since the beginning of the series, Katims considered that the series would end with the Taylors leaving Dillon, which would serve as a contrast to the first episode when Eric began as a head coach. He explained, "what we tried to do above everything else on Friday Night Lights is we tried to be as honest as possible about what would really happen. And I do feel that that is often the life of a high school football coach, where they wind up going from town to town and making those towns their home."

The writers considered many versions of the final game. On choosing the final cut, Katims said, "I realized after going through a lot of versions of that game, what I was interested in was not so much the details of the game itself. I felt like this story that we wanted to tell we wanted to do in a more poetic way. It was more about the beauty of this game itself and the meaning of it to Coach Taylor and all of the players on the team, and it wasn't about the specifics of the strategy or who caught that pass or what play won the game — it wasn't about that. We wanted that game to play in a more poetic way. It was less about watching the details of the game and hearing the football commentators talking about what was going on. It felt like we were in a different place with this game and we didn't feel like there was anything from a football standpoint that there was any great story to tell — this was more about the lives of the coach and these players and the fans and all these people that we had come to know and get invested in and love."

=== Casting ===
While the episode saw the addition of former regular cast members, Katims considered adding more past characters. However, the writers decided to instead just focus on the story and only bring back actors if there was an "authentic" reason for it to happen. Katims said, "The decisions about who we brought back was based partly on actors' availability, but beyond that it was who we felt we could service storywise. We didn't want to bring people back as window dressing, and I'm sure they wouldn't have wanted to come back that way."

Scott Porter wanted to be part of the finale, and he appeared in the scene where Tim and Billy build the house, which was even published in some forums. While the scene was filmed, it was cut from the final edition, which was deemed by Katims as "a good example of having an embarrassment of riches in terms of your cast and your story." Katims explained that they considered either Jason or Tyra to help Tim and they settled on using Billy as they felt it was the "correct" decision. Nevertheless, Katims felt Porter was content with the decision, saying "He just wanted to do the scene. It didn't matter to him whether it made the final cut. He just wanted the experience of doing the scene."

== Reception ==
=== Viewers ===
In its original American broadcast on NBC, "Always" was seen by an estimated 3.18 million household viewers with a 0.8/3 in the 18–49 demographics. This means that 0.8 percent of all households with televisions watched the episode, while 3 percent of all of those watching television at the time of the broadcast watched it. This was a slight increase in viewership from the previous episode, which was watched by an estimated 3.01 million household viewers with a 0.7/3 in the 18–49 demographics.

=== Critical reviews ===
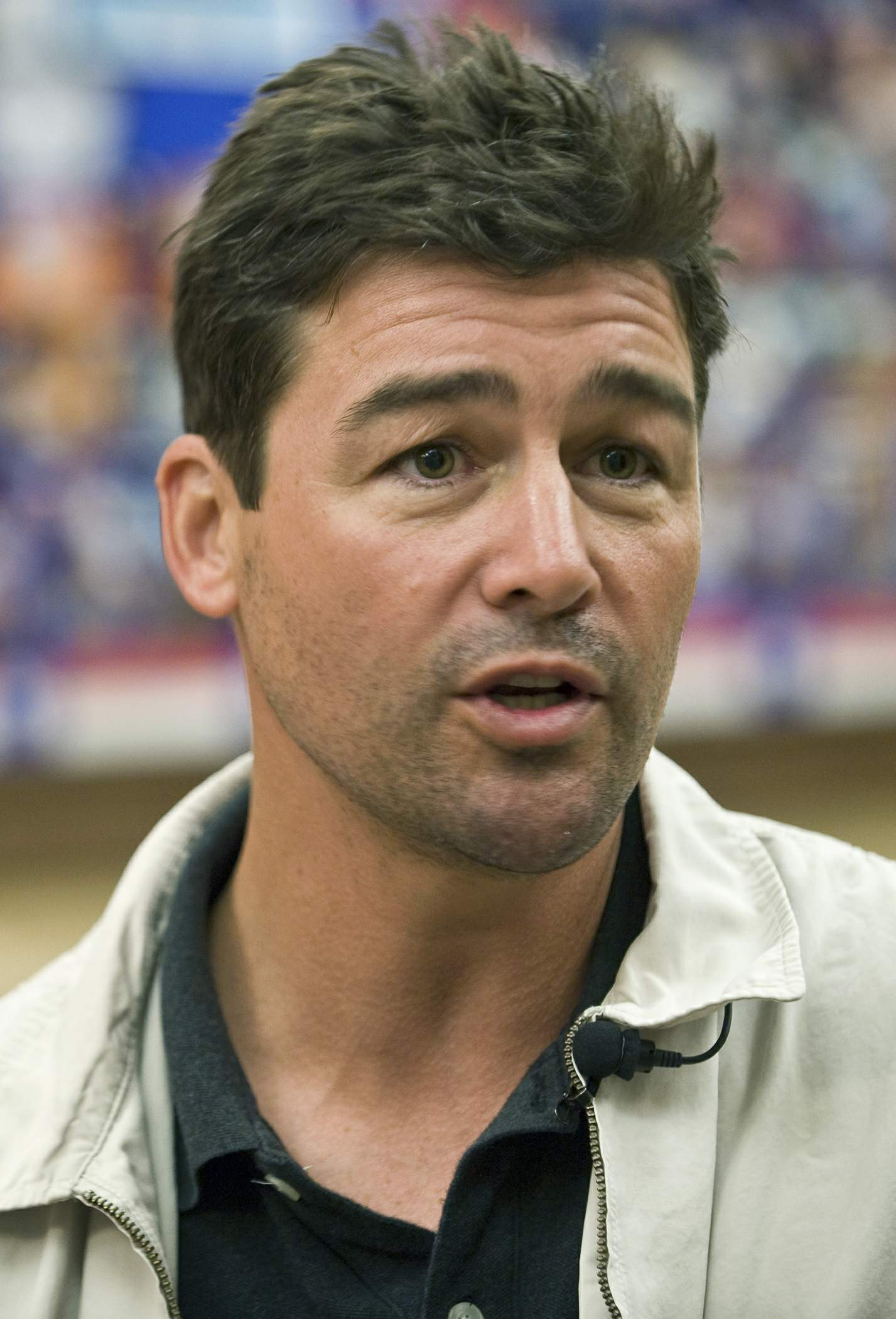
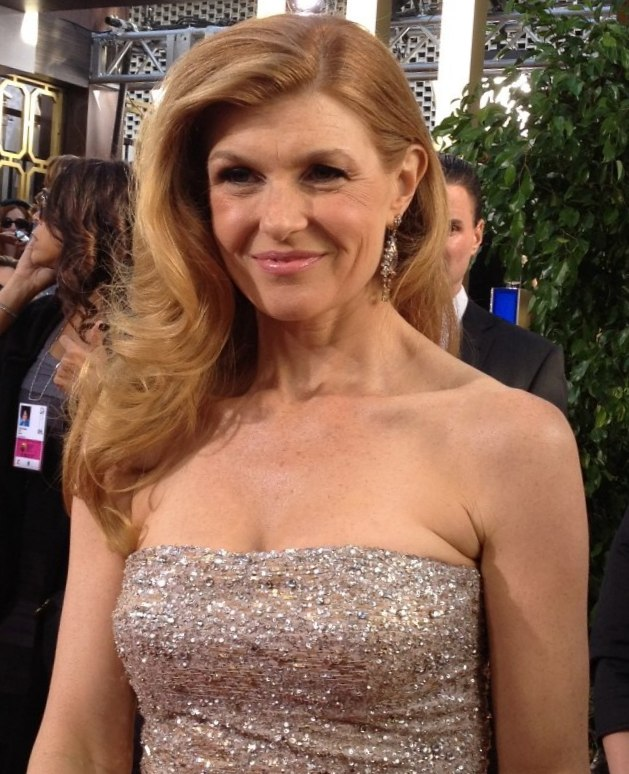
Kyle Chandler and Connie Britton received acclaim for their performances in the episode. Both received nominations at the 63rd Primetime Emmy Awards, with Chandler winning.

"Always" was praised by critics. Eric Goldman of IGN gave the episode nine out of ten and wrote, "Oh, I loved it! Now I can't say it was among the very best Friday Night Lights episodes ever, but it was still a very strong installment that had all the heart and humanity we've come to expect from this special show."

Keith Phipps of The A.V. Club gave the episode an "A" grade and wrote, "Friday Night Lights was a realistic-looking show that took liberties with reality — letting teenagers get away with truancy and vagrancy, catapulting Tami into heavy professional responsibilities with little experience, and so on. But it never felt less than real, thanks to its remarkable characters, the extraordinary actors who gave them life, and the care that went into creating such a strong sense of place. You won't find Dillon, Texas on the map. But if you're like me you feel like you've been there." James Poniewozik of TIME wrote, "The Taylors' kids are going to be all right. And it's OK for Eric and Tami to move on. This was the simple resolution that FNL's finale offered — and it's why, though I sobbed but good watching this finale, it didn't feel sad. It just felt right."

Alan Sepinwall of HitFix wrote, "Sometimes, good things get to happen to good people. In the Friday Night Lights finale, good things happened to almost everyone. And that feels pretty damn excellent." Ken Tucker of Entertainment Weekly wrote, "This was a rare gem of a series that could both lift your spirits and give you the ugliest ugly cries you've ever experienced."

Andy Greenwald of Vulture wrote, "You knew the truth: that while universally lauded Hall of Fame shows like The Sopranos or Mad Men may make us gasp or think, only Friday Night Lights makes us cry like this, with joy or sadness. Those shows belong to the culture at large. Dillon belongs to us." Alison Winn Scotch of Paste wrote, "These are characters who have struggled, mightily struggled, to find their way, to find their happiness and to find their purpose, and because of this, we saw ourselves in their struggle. They all worked toward redemption. They all worked toward a better life. And five years later, they did all of these things — found redemption, mostly found better lives, almost always found something akin to happiness."

Maureen Ryan of TV Squad wrote, "For five seasons, 'Friday Night Lights' has shown us that trouble will crop up soon enough. For once, these hard-working people more or less got what they wanted. That's all I wanted too." David Plotz of Slate wrote, "That was a full pound of fat brisket at Smitty's in Lockhart. That was an ice-cold Lone Star. That was driving down a highway lined with bluebonnets, Miss Texas riding shotgun. Was it heaven? No, it was Texas."

Jen Chaney of The Washington Post wrote, "It was, on the whole, as lovely an ending as a fan could hope for. If anyone wonders why Friday Night Lights earned an Emmy nomination this week for best drama, this episode explained it all." Leigh Raines of TV Fanatic gave the episode a perfect 5 star out of 5 rating and wrote, "Everyone may have gone their separate ways, but there's one thing we can all agree on: Texas Forever." Television Without Pity gave the episode an "A+" grade.

TV Guide and BuddyTV listed the finale as the best TV episode of 2011.

=== Accolades ===
For the episode, Kyle Chandler won Outstanding Lead Actor in a Drama Series, while Jason Katims won Outstanding Writing for a Drama Series at the 63rd Primetime Emmy Awards, making the first Emmy wins for the series. Connie Britton also received a nomination for Outstanding Lead Actress in a Drama Series, losing to Julianna Margulies for The Good Wife.
