= Fracture (Friday Night Lights) =

- Friday Night Lights episode
- Episode no.: Season 5 Episode 8
- Directed by: Allison Liddi-Brown
- Written by: Monica Henderson
- Cinematography by: Todd McMullen
- Editing by: Angela M. Catanzaro
- Original release dates: January 5, 2011 (DirecTV); June 3, 2011 (NBC)
- Running time: 43 minutes

Guest appearances
- Zach Gilford as Matt Saracen; Brad Leland as Buddy Garrity; Derek Phillips as Billy Riggins; Cress Williams as Ornette Howard; Gil McKinney as Derek Bishop; Emily Rios as Epyck Sanders

Episode chronology
← Previous "Perfect Record"	Next → "Gut Check"
- Friday Night Lights (season 5)

"Fracture" is the eighth episode of the fifth season of the American sports drama television series Friday Night Lights, inspired by the 1990 nonfiction book by H. G. Bissinger. It is the 71st overall episode of the series and was written by Monica Henderson, and directed by Allison Liddi-Brown. It originally aired on DirecTV's 101 Network on January 5, 2011, before airing on NBC on June 3, 2011.

The series is set in the fictional town of Dillon, a small, close-knit community in rural West Texas. It follows a high school football team, the Dillon Panthers. It features a set of characters, primarily connected to Coach Eric Taylor, his wife Tami, and their daughter Julie. In the episode, the Lions are annoyed by Vince's attitude, just as the latter gets an offer. Meanwhile, Derek visits Dillon, while Becky enters a beauty pageant.

According to Nielsen Media Research, the episode was seen by an estimated 2.91 million household viewers and gained a 0.8/3 ratings share among adults aged 18–49. The episode received critical acclaim, who praised the performances and ending.

== Plot ==
Vince (Michael B. Jordan) is interviewed by the media for his performance in the past games, but the Lions mock his ego as he only talks about himself. At home, Julie (Aimee Teegarden) is surprised when Derek (Gil McKinney) shows up, wanting to talk with her. However, an enraged Eric (Kyle Chandler) forces him to leave his property.

Vince and Ornette (Cress Williams) are invited to Oklahoma Tech, as a representative is interested in Vince as a potential recruit. They are fascinated by the campus, which includes a public pool, deluxe services and privileges. When the coach asks for a verbal commitment to play for them within two years, Vince decides to accept the offer when his father encourages him. Jess (Jurnee Smollett) is not content with Vince's decision, as he not only missed practice to visit the campus, but it could violate the rules as he has accepted a college offer despite not being a senior. Vince comforts her and also lies to Eric about his absence, claiming he needed to help his mother.

Becky (Madison Burge) is unable to have sex with Luke (Matt Lauria), still thinking about the abortion. Mindy (Stacey Oristano) decides to enroll her at the Miss Young Texas beauty pageant, hoping it will cheer her up. She finishes as the second runner-up, and while Mindy is annoyed, Becky is content. Derek approaches Tami (Connie Britton) at school, telling her that he quit his job and that he wants to meet with Julie to correct things up, but Tami shuts him up and then sends him away. However, Julie decides to meet him anyway and Derek explains that he is divorcing and he does not want to see Julie jeopardize her future. Derek offers her in accompanying her to Tennessee to have a fresh start, which Julie seriously considers.

Tami continues struggling with counseling Epyck (Emily Rios), who constantly gets into trouble. When she finds out Epyck lied to her about having abusive foster homes, Tami tells her she does not need to lie to her and that she believes in her. Eric tells Ornette that he knows about the trip to Oklahoma, and warns that he will bench Vince if he misses practice again. Ornette then reveals that he knows about Eric’s Shane State's offer, to which Eric simply responds that he is being serious. Vince and Luke get into a conflict just as they prepare for a rally. Becky leaves a note for Luke in which she tells him she is finally ready to start over. Julie finally heads back to college, calling Derek to confirm her that he only visited Dillon to get her back, which he does. This prompts Julie to decide to go to Chicago instead, visiting Matt (Zach Gilford) at his apartment.

== Production ==
=== Development ===
The episode was written by Monica Henderson, and directed by Allison Liddi-Brown. This was Henderson's first writing credit, and Liddi-Brown's sixth directing credit.

== Reception ==
=== Viewers ===
In its original American broadcast on NBC, "Fracture" was seen by an estimated 2.91 million household viewers with a 0.8/3 in the 18–49 demographics. This means that 0.8 percent of all households with televisions watched the episode, while 3 percent of all of those watching television at the time of the broadcast watched it. This was a slight decrease in viewership from the previous episode, which was watched by an estimated 2.92 million household viewers with a 0.8/4 in the 18–49 demographics.

=== Critical reviews ===
"Fracture" received critical acclaim. Keith Phipps of The A.V. Club gave the episode an "A–" grade and wrote, "FNL has let its characters experience plenty of heartbreaking setbacks but it tends to pull back from truly unhappy endings. It ultimately lands on the side of pragmatic optimism, the sort rooted in the faith that goodness begets goodness. That's part of why I, and I suspect anyone reading this, love the show. And yet it seems like a show that could tilt all the way into darkness. This team could fall apart. Coach might not come through. And that's part of why we love it too."

Alan Sepinwall of HitFix wrote, "This is a very dark period for most of our characters – one of the episode's more optimistic stories includes Becky losing a beauty pageant – and that's often when Friday Night Lights is at its best. And, boy, was “Fracture” not only among the season's best, but the series'." Ken Tucker of Entertainment Weekly wrote, "Friday Night Lights continued to push our hero Vince into antihero territory this week — that's what can happen when you start taking your cues from the long-absent father who's suddenly showering you with attention."

Andy Greenwald of Vulture wrote, "The woozy pep rally at the end of the episode is one of the most disturbing things we’ve seen on a show that's never shied away from tough times. This time the rot seems deeper, more complicated. And much harder to get out." Jen Chaney of The Washington Post wrote, "Do we care about Epyck? I do mildly, but appreciate this part of the narrative more because I love watching Tami Taylor in ultra-caring educator mode."

Leigh Raines of TV Fanatic gave the episode a 4.5 star out of 5 rating and wrote, "From the moment "Fracture" kicked off it was Vince this, Vince that, as we watched a self-centered post-game interview with the star quarterback." Television Without Pity gave the episode an "A–" grade.
