= Keep Looking =

- Friday Night Lights episode
- Episode no.: Season 5 Episode 4
- Directed by: Todd McMullen
- Written by: Bridget Carpenter
- Cinematography by: Ian Ellis
- Editing by: Angela M. Catanzaro
- Original release dates: November 17, 2010 (DirecTV); May 6, 2011 (NBC)
- Running time: 43 minutes

Guest appearances
- Brad Leland as Buddy Garrity; Derek Phillips as Billy Riggins; Cress Williams as Ornette Howard; Gil McKinney as Derek Bishop; Emily Rios as Epyck Sanders

Episode chronology
← Previous "The Right Hand of the Father"	Next → "Kingdom"
- Friday Night Lights (season 5)

"Keep Looking" is the fourth episode of the fifth season of the American sports drama television series Friday Night Lights, inspired by the 1990 nonfiction book by H. G. Bissinger. It is the 67th overall episode of the series and was written by co-executive producer Bridget Carpenter, and directed by Todd McMullen. It originally aired on DirecTV's 101 Network on November 17, 2010, before airing on NBC on May 6, 2011.

The series is set in the fictional town of Dillon, a small, close-knit community in rural West Texas. It follows a high school football team, the Dillon Panthers. It features a set of characters, primarily connected to Coach Eric Taylor, his wife Tami, and their daughter Julie. In the episode, Buddy tries to reconnect with his son, while Vince struggles with his father's return. Mindy decides to help Becky with a family situation, while Luke receives an offer.

According to Nielsen Media Research, the episode was seen by an estimated 2.82 million household viewers and gained a 0.8/3 ratings share among adults aged 18–49. The episode received critical acclaim, with critics praising the performances and character development, although they expressed frustration with Julie's subplot.

== Plot ==
Buddy (Brad Leland) picks up Buddy Jr., planning to bond with him over his visit at Dillon. He enrolls Buddy Jr. at East Dillon, with the help of Tami (Connie Britton). Vince (Michael B. Jordan) starts to feel jealous as Jess (Jurnee Smollett) attracts the attention of the team, but is told by Eric (Kyle Chandler) to accept his girlfriend's job.

Becky (Madison Burge) gets in charge of coordinating the incoming school dance, convincing Mindy (Stacey Oristano) in allowing her to hold a meeting at home. During this, Becky is called by her dad, who demands that she moves back home as her stepmother is upset over her absence. She reluctantly goes back home, but Mindy refuses to let her stay with her abusive family. Mindy tells Billy (Derek Phillips) that Becky will stay with them, as they might be the closest she has to "role models." Ornette (Cress Williams) continues hanging out with Vince and his ex-wife, but Vince still refuses to let him "go back to normal" in their lives.

Buddy takes Buddy Jr. to check the town, but he is very reserved about opening up. While taking him to a restaurant, Buddy discovers that his son has fled in the car with his credit card. That night, Eric helps Buddy locate his son near a store. When he tries to flee, Buddy catches him, angrily reminding him that he is his father. Julie (Aimee Teegarden) and Derek (Gil McKinney) continue avoiding each other in campus, although there is still friction between them. When Julie visits him to clear things up, they share a kiss.

At the school dance, Vince makes it clear to Jess that he is not comfortable with her job at the team, but she refuses to quit. Tami is forced to expel Epyck (Emily Rios) and her friends from the dance when they are caught smoking. Vince visits Ornette, allowing him to continue visiting him, but warning him not to let the past influence his mother's drug addiction. Eric allows Luke (Matt Lauria) to visit TMU for tryouts with the football team, and he in turn takes the football team. There, Vince is approached by TMU's head coach, and he enters his office.

== Production ==
=== Development ===
The episode was written by co-executive producer Bridget Carpenter, and directed by Todd McMullen. This was Carpenter's ninth writing, and McMullen's first directing credit.

== Reception ==
=== Viewers ===
In its original American broadcast on NBC, "Keep Looking" was seen by an estimated 2.82 million household viewers with a 0.8/3 in the 18–49 demographics. This means that 0.8 percent of all households with televisions watched the episode, while 3 percent of all of those watching television at the time of the broadcast watched it. This was a slight decrease in viewership from the previous episode, which was watched by an estimated 2.99 million household viewers with a 0.7/2 in the 18–49 demographics.

=== Critical reviews ===
"Keep Looking" received critical acclaim. Keith Phipps of The A.V. Club gave the episode an "A–" grade and wrote, "Those are big themes, but Friday Night Lights has never shied away from big themes. I wouldn't expect that to change as it looks to the end."

Alan Sepinwall of HitFix wrote, "Not everything's clicking but the season is starting to feel like it's taking shape." Ken Tucker of Entertainment Weekly wrote, "Few dramas can make an absorbing hour out of its characters trying to avoid drama, but Friday Night Lights pulled it off this week."

Andy Greenwald of Vulture wrote, "Without the often-outrageous uplift provided by the gridiron scenes, our characters are forced to deal with the messier realities of their helmet-free lives. And nothing tends to be messier on Friday Night Lights than parent-child relations, many of which are brought to the fore on a week when the show’s reliably best parent, Coach Taylor, is marginalized." Alison Winn Scotch of Paste wrote, "Turns out, there might be hope for these kids yet. And by season's end, they might just have found what they've looking for."

Todd Martens of Los Angeles Times wrote, "Writers have scripted a rich world for the characters to explore, and the most offensive aspect of the Julie/Gil subplot is that it's keeping us from doing so." Leigh Raines of TV Fanatic gave the episode a 4 star out of 5 rating and wrote, "The episode closed on a perfect note with Luke taking the boys to visit TMU. However, once we saw Vince enter the Head Coach's office alone, it was a sign of conflict ahead. Then again there's always drama when it comes to recruiting." Television Without Pity gave the episode an "A–" grade.
