= Expectations (Friday Night Lights) =

- Friday Night Lights episode
- Episode no.: Season 5 Episode 1
- Directed by: Michael Waxman
- Written by: David Hudgins
- Cinematography by: Todd McMullen
- Editing by: Margaret Guinee
- Original release dates: October 27, 2010 (DirecTV); April 15, 2011 (NBC)
- Running time: 45 minutes

Guest appearances
- Taylor Kitsch as Tim Riggins; Jesse Plemons as Landry Clarke; Brad Leland as Buddy Garrity; Derek Phillips as Billy Riggins; Lorraine Toussaint as Birdie "Bird" Merriweather

Episode chronology
| ← Previous "Thanksgiving" | Next → "On the Outside Looking In" |
- Friday Night Lights (season 5)

"Expectations" is the first episode of the fifth season of the American sports drama television series Friday Night Lights, inspired by the 1990 nonfiction book by H. G. Bissinger. It is the 64th overall episode of the series and was written by executive producer David Hudgins, and directed by producer Michael Waxman. It originally aired on DirecTV's 101 Network on October 27, 2010, before airing on NBC on April 15, 2011.

The series is set in the fictional town of Dillon, a small, close-knit community in rural West Texas. It follows a high school football team, the Dillon Panthers. It features a set of characters, primarily connected to Coach Eric Taylor, his wife Tami, and their daughter Julie. In the episode, the Lions prepare for the first game of the season. Meanwhile, Julie and Landry prepare to leave for college, while Becky faces problems with her stepmother.

According to Nielsen Media Research, the episode was seen by an estimated 3.57 million household viewers and gained a 0.9/3 ratings share among adults aged 18–49. The episode received extremely positive reviews from critics, who praised the performances, storylines and themes.

== Plot ==
As the football season begins, Julie (Aimee Teegarden) prepares to leave for college. Tim (Taylor Kitsch) is still in prison, with three months left before a possible release. Billy (Derek Phillips) is considering a coaching job, while Tami (Connie Britton) adjusts to her new job as the guidance counselor at East Dillon.

Billy convinces Eric (Kyle Chandler) in hiring him as a coach for the Lions, despite the low funds for the football program. Buddy (Brad Leland) also introduces Eric to Hastings Ruckle (Grey Damon), a talented basketball player who might be a potential football team member. However, Hastings is not interested in football, downplaying it as a celebration of violence and aggression. Eric then turns to Vince (Michael B. Jordan) and Luke (Matt Lauria), asking them in convincing Hasting in trying out. At a party, Hastings is finally convinced in trying, despite some protesting that he should stick to basketball.

Becky (Madison Burge) stays with her father's new family because her mother is away for a job. However, even though she tries to bond with her infant step-sister, her stepmother is uncooperative and does not allow her to help in taking care of the baby. Vince and Jess (Jurnee Smollett) are now a couple, although Jess is frustrated that her father left to expand his franchise and left her to take care of her brothers, and his brother Andre is not respecting her. Landry (Jesse Plemons) prepares to leave for Rice University, and invites Julie to join him at a concert for his band. Afterwards, Julie takes him to a strip club, where they bid each other farewell before they both leave Dillon.

The Lions face the Croft Cowboys, the reigning champions, on the first game. While the Cowboys win 28-14 by halftime, Luke severely tackles their quarterback, impacting the performance in the remainder of the game. With 28-27 in the last second, the Lions go for a two-point conversion and Luke manages to score, surprising the media. Later, Vince asks Andre to give Jess a break, knowing that his father's absence is affecting him. After overhearing her stepmother talking badly about her, Becky asks Billy to allow her to move in with him, which he allows. Julie hugs her parents farewell, and then drives off to college.

== Production ==
=== Development ===
The episode was written by executive producer David Hudgins, and directed by producer Michael Waxman. This was Hudgins' ninth writing credit, and Waxman's eighth directing credit.

== Reception ==
=== Viewers ===
In its original American broadcast on NBC, "Expectations" was seen by an estimated 3.57 million household viewers with a 0.9/3 in the 18–49 demographics. This means that 0.9 percent of all households with televisions watched the episode, while 3 percent of all of those watching television at the time of the broadcast watched it. This was a slight increase in viewership from the previous episode, which was watched by an estimated 3.56 million household viewers with a 1.1/5 in the 18–49 demographics.

=== Critical reviews ===
"Expectations" received extremely positive reviews from critics. Eric Goldman of IGN gave the episode a "great" 8 out of 10 and wrote, "So how was the season premiere? Really good. Not among the very best of the series, but this is a show whose average episode is so far better than most."

Keith Phipps of The A.V. Club gave the episode a "B+" grade and wrote, "Then, in its usual, quiet way, the show pauses to let us soak it in before rolling credits. This season may be about saying goodbyes, but for now I'm just happy to have Friday Night Lights back."

Alan Sepinwall of HitFix wrote, "Overall, a solid but not riveting premiere. No goosebumps ala Eric in the halftime locker room last year, but as always, it’s good to be back in Dillon." Ken Tucker of Entertainment Weekly wrote, "Julie driving off into the future as Eric and Tami stayed behind to anchor the show did make for a nice scene of misty finality. The episode was titled “Expectations,” and mine are high for the new season."

Andy Greenwald of Vulture wrote, "We're not sure where we're headed this year but we trust the behind-the-camera folks to get us there. For the moment, we're content to just sit here beaming like Grandma Saracen." Alison Winn Scotch of Paste wrote, "Over the years, the Taylors have ushered so many kids out into the world, but no goodbye has been as heartfelt or as moving as that of their oldest daughter. It was both gutting and inspiring. As good as any win on the field. I can't wait to see what happens next."

Todd Martens of Los Angeles Times wrote, "There will, of course, be football too, but the wins and losses of the East Dillon Lions are not the center of the drama. The game, instead, is a largely a relief from it - an almost comforting reminder that Coach Taylor's dream of ‘teamwork’ does have a place in this world, if only between two goal posts." Matt Richenthal of TV Fanatic gave the episode a 4.5 star out of 5 rating and wrote, "Even an episode that has all of the excitement of new beginnings still managed to tug at my heartstrings. In 'Expectations' it's the end of the old guard as Landry and Julie head off to college. Still, something feels different. There's a sense of heart we haven't really felt since season one." Television Without Pity gave the episode an "A" grade.
