= Swerve (Friday Night Lights) =

- Friday Night Lights episode
- Episode no.: Season 5 Episode 6
- Directed by: Jonas Pate
- Written by: Ron Fitzgerald
- Cinematography by: Todd McMullen
- Editing by: Stephen Michael
- Original release dates: December 8, 2010 (DirecTV); May 20, 2011 (NBC)
- Running time: 43 minutes

Guest appearances
- Brad Leland as Buddy Garrity; Derek Phillips as Billy Riggins; Cress Williams as Ornette Howard; Lorraine Toussaint as Birdie "Bird" Merriweather; Barry Tubb as Tom Cafferty

Episode chronology
← Previous "Kingdom"	Next → "Perfect Record"
- Friday Night Lights (season 5)

"Swerve" is the sixth episode of the fifth season of the American sports drama television series Friday Night Lights, inspired by the 1990 nonfiction book by H. G. Bissinger. It is the 69th overall episode of the series and was written by producer Ron Fitzgerald, and directed by Jonas Pate. It originally aired on DirecTV's 101 Network on December 8, 2010, before airing on NBC on May 20, 2011.

The series is set in the fictional town of Dillon, a small, close-knit community in rural West Texas. It follows a high school football team, the Dillon Panthers. It features a set of characters, primarily connected to Coach Eric Taylor, his wife Tami, and their daughter Julie. In the episode, Luke discovers a truth about his recruitment, while Vince's past catches up with him. Julie stays at home for a few days, to her father's chagrin.

According to Nielsen Media Research, the episode was seen by an estimated 3.34 million household viewers and gained a 0.9/4 ratings share among adults aged 18–49. The episode received critical acclaim, with critics praising Julie's subplot, although Vince's subplot drew criticism.

== Plot ==
Vince (Michael B. Jordan) is approached by Kenard (Cedric Neal), who gloats about having avenged Calvin's death. He is still mad at Vince for pulling out of the hit, and tells him that he owes him $5,000. Julie (Aimee Teegarden) bids farewell to her parents and leaves back for college. However, she instead intentionally crashes the car and claims it was an accident preventing her from going back to college.

The team congratulates Eric (Kyle Chandler), who was named as the "Kingmaker" on a sports magazine. Luke (Matt Lauria) realizes that TMU was never planning on recruiting him, as they actually used him to attract Vince instead. This destroys Luke's spirits during practice, even though Eric tells him he will find better college opportunities. Vince comes up short with the money, and Calvin starts harassing Jess (Jurnee Smollett) to threaten Vince. With no other options, Vince asks Ornette (Cress Williams) for help, despite not wanting to get him back into his criminal past. He agrees to help.

Julie opens up about her affair to Tami (Connie Britton), and Eric is irate over Derek sleeping with a student. Tami consoles her daughter, realizing she does not want to go to college as she feels ashamed of herself after Derek's wife slapped her in front of everyone. Tami tries to convince Eric in being more empathic towards Julie, but he is truly disappointed in her. He tells Julie that he will pay to fix her car, after which she will go back to college and pay for the money later, which she agrees to do. However, Julie refuses to go when the car is fixed, and Eric refuses to leave the house for the Lions' next game, concerning the coaching staff.

With Eric not arriving, Billy (Derek Phillips) gives an inspiring speech to the team before the game, just as Eric finally arrives. As the Lions win their fifth game in a row, Ornette confronts Kenard over Vince's debt. Ornette brutally beats Kenard and grabs his gun, making him swear to stay away from Vince and Jess. He returns home, telling Vince that it is over. He then dines with the family, where he is questioned over his time in jail as he responds it was a very hard time due to being apart from his beloved ones. Mindy (Stacey Oristano) tells Becky (Madison Burge), who still thinks about Tim, to get over him because nothing will ever happen between the two of them, even after he gets out of jail. She then goes on to encourage Becky to finally give Luke a chance and tries to set them up. Eric returns home and sees a sleeping Gracie in her bed. Behind him, Julie appears, saying she didn't want to disappoint him.

== Production ==
=== Development ===
The episode was written by producer Ron Fitzgerald, and directed by Jonas Pate. This was Fitzgerald's second writing credit, and Pate's fourth directing credit.

== Reception ==
=== Viewers ===
In its original American broadcast on NBC, "Swerve" was seen by an estimated 3.34 million household viewers with a 0.9/4 in the 18–49 demographics. This means that 0.9 percent of all households with televisions watched the episode, while 4 percent of all of those watching television at the time of the broadcast watched it. This was a 15% increase in viewership from the previous episode, which was watched by an estimated 2.88 million household viewers with a 0.8/3 in the 18–49 demographics.

=== Critical reviews ===
"Swerve" received critical acclaim. Keith Phipps of The A.V. Club gave the episode an "A–" grade and wrote, "However overly familiar and disconnected from the rest of the show the Julie/T.A. subplot has seemed until now, 'Swerve' brought it all back home, showing how Julie's misadventures in independence have redefined her relationship with her parents."

Alan Sepinwall of HitFix wrote, "if the payoff to Julie and the TA has shown me anything this week, it's that the FNL writers and actors are good enough that they can find a way to make me care about stories I've grown to utterly hate, so I'll give it a bit more time." Ken Tucker of Entertainment Weekly wrote, "'Swerve' was a fine Friday Night Lights outing. Now if we can only get a quick scene of Julie rebuilding that mailbox she hit and heading back to college, all will be well."

Andy Greenwald of Vulture wrote, "'Swerve,' this final season's second outstanding episode in a row, was ostensibly about the suddenly complicated predicaments of Vince, Luke, and Julie. But it was elevated by the unpolished reactions and fumbling attempts to help made by the grown-ups on the show." Alison Winn Scotch of Paste wrote, "Given how much I love these characters, I’ll take what I can get. Keep bringing it, Billy! Maybe you can turn this whole damn town around by the series end."

Leigh Raines of TV Fanatic gave the episode a 4.5 star out of 5 rating and wrote, "Bonds and strength will be tested in upcoming episodes, but knowing this crew, they will find a way to make it work. I, for one, am very eager to see how it all plays out." Television Without Pity gave the episode an "A–" grade.
