= The March (Friday Night Lights) =

- Friday Night Lights episode
- Episode no.: Season 5 Episode 11
- Directed by: Jason Katims
- Written by: Rolin Jones
- Cinematography by: Todd McMullen
- Editing by: Robert Frazen
- Original release dates: January 26, 2011 (DirecTV); July 1, 2011 (NBC)
- Running time: 43 minutes

Guest appearances
- Taylor Kitsch as Tim Riggins; Brad Leland as Buddy Garrity; Derek Phillips as Billy Riggins; Cress Williams as Ornette Howard; Lorraine Toussaint as Birdie "Bird" Merriweather; Bruce Altman as Head of Braemore; Dana Wheeler-Nicholson as Angela Collette

Episode chronology
← Previous "Don't Go"	Next → "Texas Whatever"
- Friday Night Lights (season 5)

"The March" is the eleventh episode of the fifth season of the American sports drama television series Friday Night Lights, inspired by the 1990 nonfiction book by H. G. Bissinger. It is the 74th overall episode of the series and was written by supervising producer Rolin Jones, and directed by executive producer Jason Katims. It originally aired on DirecTV's 101 Network on January 26, 2011, before airing on NBC on July 1, 2011.

The series is set in the fictional town of Dillon, a small, close-knit community in rural West Texas. It follows a high school football team, the Dillon Panthers. It features a set of characters, primarily connected to Coach Eric Taylor, his wife Tami, and their daughter Julie. In the episode, the Lions prepare for the playoffs. Meanwhile, Tami receives an offer, Tim adjusts to his life outside prison, and Vince realizes that his father is falling in old habits.

According to Nielsen Media Research, the episode was seen by an estimated 2.45 million household viewers and gained a 0.6/3 ratings share among adults aged 18–49, making it the least watched episode of the series. The episode received critical acclaim, with critics praising the themes, performances and set-up for the final episodes.

== Plot ==
The Lions win against West Cambria, and they prepare for the final 3 games before reaching State. However, Eric (Kyle Chandler) and Tami (Connie Britton) are informed by the school principal that budget cuts will occur in the school within the next year, and some teachers will lose their jobs.

Tim (Taylor Kitsch) has started working for Buddy (Brad Leland) at his bar, still struggling in adjusting to come back to life out of prison. Ornette (Cress Williams) has started to become more demanding at home, disappointing both Vince (Michael B. Jordan) and his mother. Tami is offered a position as assistant admissions director at a college in Philadelphia, and tells Eric that her visit will prevent her from attending the semi-finals. The Lions win the following games, qualifying to the semi-finals. However, the principal still tells Eric that football is a key budget cut, but promises to vouch for him. Jess (Jurnee Smollett) asks Eric to be part of the coaching staff by being his assistant. Eric is reluctant due to thinking that football is not suited for a girl, but after Jess reminds him she is not asking to play, he accepts her request.

Tim is angry that Billy (Derek Phillips) allowed Becky (Madison Burge) to work at the strip club, where she is constantly harassed by the customers. They get into a fight outside, where Tim scolds Billy for not taking care of Becky as he had asked while he ruined his life for him, and leaves after punching him. He apologizes to Becky for getting her fired, and decides to move out of the house. When Ornette returns to his alcoholism and drug dealing, Vince and his mother change the door locks, causing him to almost break it before leaving as she has called the police. The principal calls Eric to let him know that while the football program will continue, only one football team will remain in Dillon and that will be decided later on.

At Braemore College, Tami is questioned over her past as principal at Dillon High. The board is impressed by her, and they offer her the position of Dean of Admissions. The Lions face Arnett Mead in the semi-finals, losing 13-9 with two minutes left. Vince, Luke (Matt Lauria) and Hastings (Grey Damon) manage to bounce back and win the game, and the Lions are officially going to State. Even though Mindy (Stacey Oristano) tries to convince him to stay, Tim moves back to the home trailer and starts drinking again. Eric takes the team to celebrate, although he is disappointed that Tami is not present.

== Production ==
=== Development ===
The episode was written by supervising producer Rolin Jones, and directed by executive producer Jason Katims. This was Jones' fourth writing credit, and Katims' second directing credit.

== Reception ==
=== Viewers ===
In its original American broadcast on NBC, "The March" was seen by an estimated 2.45 million household viewers with a 0.6/3 in the 18–49 demographics. This means that 0.6 percent of all households with televisions watched the episode, while 3 percent of all of those watching television at the time of the broadcast watched it. This was a 14% decrease in viewership from the previous episode, which was watched by an estimated 2.82 million household viewers with a 0.8/3 in the 18–49 demographics.

=== Critical reviews ===
"The March" received critical acclaim. Genevieve Koski of The A.V. Club gave the episode an "A–" grade and wrote, "Deep down, he doesn't really believe that all this Philly nonsense will lead to anything, yet there he is, alone on the field during his moment of glory. What does this mean for the Taylors? Hard to say, but one thing's for certain... we're going to State!"

Alan Sepinwall of HitFix wrote, "Two episodes to go, and I expect Jason Katims and company to rip my heart out a time or twelve in those episodes. Dammit. I wouldn't be mad if I didn't care, and boy have they made me care over the years." Ken Tucker of Entertainment Weekly wrote, "The return of Tim Riggins set this week's Friday Night Lights into emotional motion. What was striking was that, as superb as Taylor Kitsch has always been in this role, FNL has raised a supporting cast during his absence that has risen to the challenge of this terrific series."

Andy Greenwald of Vulture wrote, "A rushed episode, then, and a problematic one, but the decks have been cleared for the last two weeks." Jen Chaney of The Washington Post wrote, "this week's episode, 'The March,' was filled with implausible moments, moments that, arguably, the writers needed to create in order to get their narrative ducks in a row for the finale that airs in two weeks. And actually, some of the hard-to-believe plot developments resulted in satisfying television. Others, however necessary from a story perspective, were head scratchers of the highest order."

Leigh Raines of TV Fanatic gave the episode a perfect 5 star out of 5 rating and wrote, "With only one episode left until the finale, tensions are high as everything can change in the blink in the eye. It also looks like Coach will have to deal with the fact that his wife's dreams go beyond being a high school guidance counselor and she's gotten the opportunity of a lifetime." Television Without Pity gave the episode an "A+" grade.
