= Don't Go (Friday Night Lights) =

- Friday Night Lights episode
- Episode no.: Season 5 Episode 10
- Directed by: Michael Waxman
- Written by: Bridget Carpenter
- Cinematography by: Todd McMullen
- Editing by: Stephen Michael
- Original release dates: January 19, 2011 (DirecTV); June 24, 2011 (NBC)
- Running time: 43 minutes

Guest appearances
- Taylor Kitsch as Tim Riggins; Brad Leland as Buddy Garrity; Derek Phillips as Billy Riggins; Cress Williams as Ornette Howard

Episode chronology
← Previous "Gut Check"	Next → "The March"
- Friday Night Lights (season 5)

"Don't Go" is the tenth episode of the fifth season of the American sports drama television series Friday Night Lights, inspired by the 1990 nonfiction book by H. G. Bissinger. It is the 73rd overall episode of the series and was written by co-executive producer Bridget Carpenter, and directed by producer Michael Waxman. It originally aired on DirecTV's 101 Network on January 19, 2011, before airing on NBC on June 24, 2011.

The series is set in the fictional town of Dillon, a small, close-knit community in rural West Texas. It follows a high school football team, the Dillon Panthers. It features a set of characters, primarily connected to Coach Eric Taylor, his wife Tami, and their daughter Julie. In the episode, the Lions work to ensure Eric stays at Dillon when rumors of his Florida offer are known. Meanwhile, Tim prepares for a parole hearing and Vince tries to earn back Eric's trust in him.

According to Nielsen Media Research, the episode was seen by an estimated 2.82 million household viewers and gained a 0.8/3 ratings share among adults aged 18–49. The episode received critical acclaim, with critics praising the directing, writing and performances.

== Plot ==
Eric (Kyle Chandler) meets with a Shane State representative, who makes him an offer as the staff was impressed with his leadership with the Lions. Billy (Derek Phillips) is informed that Tim (Taylor Kitsch) is eligible for parole, and that he can get people to testify on his behalf. Luke (Matt Lauria) tells Becky (Madison Burge) that, contrary to his hopes, he didn’t get any scholarship, so he needs to start planning a completely different future than he had imagined. Becky consoles him and says she has his back. Luke then goes to Tami (Connie Britton) for advice as he never thought about different opportunities, but she reassures him there are plenty.

Vince (Michael B. Jordan) and Ornette (Cress Williams) are informed that Oklahoma Tech chose to pass on Vince, angering Ornette. Vince realizes that his selfishness has cost him opportunities, and decides to step up and make amends with Eric, hoping to earn back his trust. While Ornette wants to meet with potential colleges, Vince asks him to leave it aside. When Ornette continues pushing for more applications, Vince angrily admonishes him while Vince’s mother asks him to think about his son, causing him to storm off. Tami leaves for a conference at Lubbock, hoping to get more people to apply for their college studies.

Discovering that Shane State has approached Eric, Buddy (Brad Leland) starts thinking about a plan to persuade him in staying. When the principal prepares a Fall Sports Banquet, Buddy convinces him in arranging as a tribute to Eric, asking the players to say some kind words to him. Vince is unsure if he can speak at the event, as he feels he has not earned his trust. Eric, Billy and Buddy all attend Tim's parole hearing, where Billy struggles in delivering his statement. Both Eric and Buddy speak fondly of Tim, deeming him as a good person who deserves another chance. Eric has a small talk with Tim before he is taken back to prison, with the verdict pending. The following day, Tim is paroled and returns home with Billy, Mindy (Stacey Oristano) and Becky.

At the banquet, the Lions deliver statements praising Eric. At home, Eric and Tami consider all the benefits of the potential new home, but Eric admits that for now, he only wants the Lions to win State. The next day, as he prepares to leave, Eric is approached by Vince outside his house. Vince states he knows about the Shane State offer, and asks him not to go. Vince admits that Eric saw the best in him and saved him, promising to improve next season if he stays. Eric drives him to school, telling him he will be the starting quarterback. At the fieldhouse, Eric is met with a standing ovation by many fans and team members, and is once again questioned over his future. Eric refers to Dillon as his home and states that he will stay, which is met with applause.

== Production ==
=== Development ===
The episode was written by co-executive producer Bridget Carpenter, and directed by producer Michael Waxman. This was Carpenter's tenth writing credit, and Waxman's tenth directing credit.

== Reception ==
=== Viewers ===
In its original American broadcast on NBC, "Don't Go" was seen by an estimated 2.82 million household viewers with a 0.8/3 in the 18–49 demographics. This means that 0.8 percent of all households with televisions watched the episode, while 3 percent of all of those watching television at the time of the broadcast watched it. This was a 9% decrease in viewership from the previous episode, which was watched by an estimated 3.07 million household viewers with a 0.9/4 in the 18–49 demographics.

=== Critical reviews ===
"Don't Go" received critical acclaim. Keith Phipps of The A.V. Club gave the episode an "A" grade and wrote, "'Don't Go' leaves us to wonder about all that as we near the end of this final, excellent season. I have every reason to believe its winding down will live up to what's come before."

Alan Sepinwall of HitFix wrote, "If this is what FNL does with three more episodes to go, I'm not sure I can even handle what else the writers have up their sleeves." Ken Tucker of Entertainment Weekly wrote, "Coach may have decided to resist that Florida house and the Most Dangerous Pool In The World For Gracie Belle, but we don’t want Friday Night Lights itself to go, do we? Knowing it has to end leaves us more nervous about the future of quality TV on Friday nights than Billy Riggins at a parole hearing."

Andy Greenwald of Vulture wrote, "More than anything else, it's the town that has become the star of the show and it's a tribute to the writers, cast, and crew that a fictional place seems so utterly fixed, permanent, and real in our minds. Perhaps that's also why so much of 'Don't Go' seemed concerned with a future we'll never get to see, but one that is awfully comforting to imagine." Jen Chaney of The Washington Post wrote, "the home stretch means it's time for the plotlines to start tugging our heart strings and making loyal viewers a little emotional as they prepare for the end."

Leigh Raines of TV Fanatic gave the episode a 4 star out of 5 rating and wrote, "Now that we're in the home stretch of Friday Night Lights' final season, there's not a single episode that doesn't get me all misty eyed. Add Tim Riggins' parole hearing into the equation and my tear ducts were a lost cause." Television Without Pity wrote, "I will not end this recap by pointing out that I find the way this "decision" got made rather irritating, as if Tami Taylor waits around for her husband to make choices so that she can just accept them. I will not end that way! COACH TAYLOR! WHAT A GUY!!! TAMI TAYLOR!!! LADY TIME!!! There, that's better."
