= Perfect Record =

- Friday Night Lights episode
- Episode no.: Season 5 Episode 7
- Directed by: Adam Davidson
- Written by: Etan Frankel; Derek Santos Olson
- Cinematography by: Todd McMullen
- Editing by: Ron Rosen
- Original release dates: December 15, 2010 (DirecTV); May 27, 2011 (NBC)
- Running time: 43 minutes

Guest appearances
- Scott Porter as Jason Street; Brad Leland as Buddy Garrity; Derek Phillips as Billy Riggins; Cress Williams as Ornette Howard; Gil McKinney as Derek Bishop

Episode chronology
← Previous "Swerve"	Next → "Fracture"
- Friday Night Lights (season 5)

"Perfect Record" is the seventh episode of the fifth season of the American sports drama television series Friday Night Lights, inspired by the 1990 nonfiction book by H. G. Bissinger. It is the 70th overall episode of the series and was written by Etan Frankel and Derek Santos Olson, and directed by Adam Davidson. It originally aired on DirecTV's 101 Network on December 15, 2010, before airing on NBC on May 27, 2011.

The series is set in the fictional town of Dillon, a small, close-knit community in rural West Texas. It follows a high school football team, the Dillon Panthers. It features a set of characters, primarily connected to Coach Eric Taylor, his wife Tami, and their daughter Julie. In the episode, criminal records detailing some of the Lions' actions are leaked to the public. Meanwhile, Billy teaches Luke how to win Becky over, and Vince has to choose between what his father and Eric want.

According to Nielsen Media Research, the episode was seen by an estimated 2.92 million household viewers and gained a 0.8/4 ratings share among adults aged 18–49. The episode received critical acclaim, with critics praising the performances, themes and character development.

== Plot ==
After practicing, Eric (Kyle Chandler) meets with Jason (Scott Porter), who is visiting Dillon. He has married Erin, and is introducing Noah to football. He offers him an assistant coaching college football position at Shane State in Florida, but Eric politely declines as he is content with his life in Dillon.

A website, LionHater.com, discloses the Lions' criminal pasts. Eric and the team immediately suspect that the Panthers leaked the records, but they claim they were not involved. Eric reassures the team that this will not impact their future, but Vince (Michael B. Jordan) is worried that his college applications may be rejected due to his past. Eric gets a call from the Shane State coaching staff, where he is informed he is wanted as a potential head coach. Eric maintains his position, which is overheard by Tami (Connie Britton). Ornette (Cress Williams) tells Vince that some colleges are still interested in him despite the leaks, and that he must put himself above what Eric wants for him.

Billy (Derek Phillips) takes Luke (Matt Lauria) on his wing, helping him train at his house. When Luke expresses his crush on Becky (Madison Burge), Billy says that the best tactic to win her over is by ignoring her, claiming it worked on him with Mindy. Luke starts ignoring Becky and hanging out with other girls, which attracts her attention. Julie (Aimee Teegarden) is forced to do chores at the house as she refuses to go back to college. Consequently, Tami visits the college to bring Julie some of her books in order for her to start studying again and runs into Derek (Gil McKinney). Both clearly feel uncomfortable in front of each other and neither of them says anything about the affair.

The Lions face the Panthers, with Luke leading the team in an aggressive defense. Vince also ignores Eric's final play and instead throws a successful touchdown with just a few seconds left, hoping to impress some college recruiters that are watching the game. While the Lions win 37-7, so many flags are thrown and Eric is questioned over his coaching. Eric confronts Vince over the final play, but Vince dismisses it. Luke meets with Becky, revealing Billy's advice when she questions him about his recent rude behaviour, which is quite unusual for him. Becky finally admits she actually likes him but because he is usually nice and caring towards her, and they kiss. Back home, Tami tells Julie that she visited her college and gives her the books she took. As Eric leaves his office, he exchanges looks with Vince and Ornette as they talk with a college representative.

== Production ==
=== Development ===
The episode was written by Etan Frankel and Derek Santos Olson, and directed by Adam Davidson. This was Frankel's second writing credit, Olson's second writing credit, and Davidson's second directing credit.

== Reception ==
=== Viewers ===
In its original American broadcast on NBC, "Perfect Record" was seen by an estimated 2.92 million household viewers with a 0.8/4 in the 18–49 demographics. This means that 0.8 percent of all households with televisions watched the episode, while 4 percent of all of those watching television at the time of the broadcast watched it. This was a 13% decrease in viewership from the previous episode, which was watched by an estimated 3.34 million household viewers with a 0.9/4 in the 18–49 demographics.

=== Critical reviews ===
"Perfect Record" received critical acclaim. Keith Phipps of The A.V. Club gave the episode an "A–" grade and wrote, "That Vince could turn his back on Coach seemed impossible as recently as two or three episodes ago, but the show has made the turning away feel convincing. I regularly confess that my understanding of football is passing at best, so I can’t speak to the believability of Vince's development as a player. But his development as a person has felt quite believable to me (thanks in no small part to Michael B. Jordan’s performance)."

Alan Sepinwall of HitFix wrote, "Though I imagine Jason Katims will give most of the characters some kind of happy ending by the time we reach episode 13, it feels like the path to those happy endings is going to be a difficult one. And the tougher life in Dillon gets, the better Friday Night Lights tends to be." Ken Tucker of Entertainment Weekly wrote, "It was terrific to see Scott Porter put in a final-season appearance, and that his character's life-story seems to have turned out well. The dialogue between Jason and Coach Eric was marvelous; no other TV actor can play that sort of joshing, paternal, poker-faced affection the way Kyle Chandler can."

Andy Greenwald of Vulture wrote, "With Kenard off the board (for now), there might not be any out-and-out villains in East Dillon. But, for one night at least, there aren’t many heroes to be found either." Jen Chaney of The Washington Post wrote, "In fact, I love it so much that I am willing to overlook the fact that the Friday Night Lights writers resorted to a classic guy cliche by having Billy tell Luke that the best way to win Becky Sproles is by ignoring her."

Leigh Raines of TV Fanatic gave the episode a 4 star out of 5 rating and wrote, "It came as no surprise that Street got as many calls as he did about Coach, but Coach already had his hands full with the Lions. Rivalry week has never been a quiet time in Dillon." Television Without Pity gave the episode an "A–" grade.
