= Kingdom (Friday Night Lights) =

- Friday Night Lights episode
- Episode no.: Season 5 Episode 5
- Directed by: Patrick Norris
- Written by: Rolin Jones
- Cinematography by: Todd McMullen
- Editing by: Matthew V. Colonna
- Original release dates: December 1, 2010 (DirecTV); May 13, 2011 (NBC)
- Running time: 43 minutes

Guest appearances
- Brad Leland as Buddy Garrity; Derek Phillips as Billy Riggins; Cress Williams as Ornette Howard; Gil McKinney as Derek Bishop

Episode chronology
| ← Previous "Keep Looking" | Next → "Swerve" |
- Friday Night Lights (season 5)

"Kingdom" is the fifth episode of the fifth season of the American sports drama television series Friday Night Lights, inspired by the 1990 nonfiction book by H. G. Bissinger. It is the 68th overall episode of the series and was written by supervising producer Rolin Jones, and directed by Patrick Norris. It originally aired on DirecTV's 101 Network on December 1, 2010, before airing on NBC on May 13, 2011.

The series is set in the fictional town of Dillon, a small, close-knit community in rural West Texas. It follows a high school football team, the Dillon Panthers. It features a set of characters, primarily connected to Coach Eric Taylor, his wife Tami, and their daughter Julie. In the episode, the Lions face off against the South King Rangers, one year after they forfeited. Meanwhile, Derek reveals a secret to Julie, and Buddy Jr. starts a hazing ceremony for the team.

According to Nielsen Media Research, the episode was seen by an estimated 2.88 million household viewers and gained a 0.8/3 ratings share among adults aged 18–49. The episode received critical acclaim, with critics praising the episode's tone and atmosphere.

== Plot ==
The Lions prepare to leave for South King High School in their next game. Before departing, Eric (Kyle Chandler) talks with Vince (Michael B. Jordan) about his meeting with Karl Gage, TMU's head coach. Eric reminds Vince not to let his potential prospects take away their performance, as he is still junior compared to Luke (Matt Lauria).

Arriving at South King, the Lions are met with a sign that misspells their name as "Loins." Nevertheless, they arrive with spirit to their hotel room, seizing the opportunity to revel in the luxuries. Buddy Jr. is subjected to a hazing ceremony, where he is often humiliated during the trip, with Hastings (Grey Damon) often leading the pranks. At college, Julie (Aimee Teegarden) continues her affair with Derek (Gil McKinney) despite him being both married and her professor. At Dillon, Tami (Connie Britton) is forced to decline a friend's invitation for a night out due to Gracie, but decides to let her friend stay with her.

The game between the Lions and the South King Rangers draws attention, as their previous match last year resulted in a forfeit. The Lions start on shaky ground, with Buddy Jr. also failing to impress as the new kicker. For the second half, Eric decides to allow the team to use different rules, inspired after seeing Karl talk with Ornette (Cress Williams) in the stand. The Lions improve their performance, which results in a 38-17 win against the Rangers, finally rebounding after the forfeit. However, some media pundits note that East Dillon committed a record 24 penalties for 245 yards, and question if the Lions will be playing like that for the rest of the season.

As Eric hangs out with Buddy (Brad Leland) and the coaching staff, the team celebrates with the locals. A drunk Luke declares that he would walk on fire for the team, and willingly allows the team to carve a scar on him. Derek's wife discovers his affair with Julie and slaps her at school in front of everyone, exposing the affair and leaving her humiliated. Julie decides to go visit Tami at home. The Lions depart South King, with Buddy Jr. now earning respect among the team members.

== Production ==
=== Development ===
The episode was written by supervising producer Rolin Jones, and directed by Patrick Norris. This was Jones' third writing credit, and Norris' sixth directing credit.

== Reception ==
=== Viewers ===
In its original American broadcast on NBC, "Kingdom" was seen by an estimated 2.88 million household viewers with a 0.8/3 in the 18–49 demographics. This means that 0.8 percent of all households with televisions watched the episode, while 3 percent of all of those watching television at the time of the broadcast watched it. This was a slight increase in viewership from the previous episode, which was watched by an estimated 2.82 million household viewers with a 0.8/3 in the 18–49 demographics.

=== Critical reviews ===
"Kingdom" received critical acclaim. Keith Phipps of The A.V. Club gave the episode an "A–" grade and wrote, "I'm not sure if Julie's homecoming marks the end of it, but it seems like foreshadowing for the other plots around her. She's gone away. Had an adventure. Broken some rules. And now coming home is going to be hard."

Alan Sepinwall of HitFix wrote, "There wasn't a powerhouse moment in this one akin to anything Zach Gilford did last year in “The Son,” but “Kingdom” may be my favorite episode of the show since that one."

Andy Greenwald of Vulture wrote, "FNL is about a team and it was nice to have a solid, self-contained episode like 'Kingdom' to remind us of this simple fact." Alison Winn Scotch of Paste wrote, "this is truly television at its finest. An episode that soared, an episode that capped what has already been a fantastic season. Yup, hands-down, this was my favorite so far."

Leigh Raines of TV Fanatic gave the episode a 4.5 star out of 5 rating and wrote, "In "Kingdom" the Lions set off on a road trip to face the team they famously forfeited to last season. Coach warned them not to play revenge football, but how far can Kingdom push them before they snap?" Television Without Pity wrote, "Damn, what a delightful episode with lots of callbacks. Another beautiful hotel balcony scene, another great forfeited in that heartbreaker of a game last season."
