= Gut Check (Friday Night Lights) =

- Friday Night Lights episode
- Episode no.: Season 5 Episode 9
- Directed by: Chris Eyre
- Written by: David Hudgins
- Cinematography by: Todd McMullen
- Editing by: Margaret Guinee
- Original release dates: January 12, 2011 (DirecTV); June 17, 2011 (NBC)
- Running time: 43 minutes

Guest appearances
- Zach Gilford as Matt Saracen; Brad Leland as Buddy Garrity; Derek Phillips as Billy Riggins; Cress Williams as Ornette Howard; Barry Tubb as Tom Cafferty; Emily Rios as Epyck Sanders

Episode chronology
← Previous "Fracture"	Next → "Don't Go"
- Friday Night Lights (season 5)

"Gut Check" is the ninth episode of the fifth season of the American sports drama television series Friday Night Lights, inspired by the 1990 nonfiction book by H. G. Bissinger. It is the 72nd overall episode of the series and was written by executive producer David Hudgins, and directed by Chris Eyre. It originally aired on DirecTV's 101 Network on January 12, 2011, before airing on NBC on June 17, 2011.

The series is set in the fictional town of Dillon, a small, close-knit community in rural West Texas. It follows a high school football team, the Dillon Panthers. It features a set of characters, primarily connected to Coach Eric Taylor, his wife Tami, and their daughter Julie. In the episode, the conflict between Vince and Luke intensifies. Mindy discovers that she is pregnant, and Julie visits Matt in Chicago.

According to Nielsen Media Research, the episode was seen by an estimated 3.07 million household viewers and gained a 0.9/4 ratings share among adults aged 18–49. The episode received critical acclaim, with critics praising the performances and character development.

== Plot ==
The Lions' undefeated streak ends when they lose 28-17, result of the tensions among the team. Vince (Michael B. Jordan) and Luke (Matt Lauria) get into a heated argument, and Eric (Kyle Chandler) kicks the team out of the fieldhouse. While the Lions are still safe for the championship, Coach Crowley states that Vince was the main problem as the team clearly doesn’t follow him anymore.

In Chicago, Julie (Aimee Teegarden) has stayed with Matt (Zach Gilford) during the weekend and eventually decides to stay a little longer. The two end up rekindling their relationship, but, while Matt likes her around, he is curious over why she is not at college. Julie eventually opens up about the affair and the shaming incident, to which Matt reassures her that she shouldn't let that take the best from her. At Dillon, Tami (Connie Britton) decides to help Epyck (Emily Rios) in passing her Texas History exam. However, a teacher accuses Epyck of stealing money, which she denies. As they get into an argument, Epyck accidentally pushes Tami against a window. Despite Tami's protests, Epyck is arrested and is relocated to a new foster home. Eric comforts Tami, telling her she did everything she could to help her.

Mindy (Stacey Oristano) starts feeling sick at work, eventually discovering that she is pregnant again. While Becky (Madison Burge) and Billy (Derek Phillips) are ecstatic, Mindy is not content, feeling that their income won't be enough to raise another child. Eric informs Vince that Luke will be the QB2 for the next games, telling him to teach Luke the team’s strategies. However, Vince refuses to do it, and gets into a heated argument with Jess (Jurnee Smollett), which results in their break-up. When Eric finds out that Vince refused to do what he asked, he informs Vince that he will be benched and replaced by Luke for the next game, disappointing him.

During their next game, Luke disappoints as the quarterback and even asks Eric to get Vince back on the game. He refuses, staying firm on his decisions, and advices him to prove his worth. Luke eventually leads the team to a comeback, winning the game and earning a spot in the playoffs. After the game, Luke introduces Becky as his girlfriend to his parents and they agree to go dining. Back in Chicago, Matt bids farewell to a heading-back-to-college Julie, assuring her that everything will work out as they both reaffirm their love for each other.

== Production ==
=== Development ===
The episode was written by executive producer David Hudgins, and directed by Chris Eyre. This was Hudgins' tenth writing credit, and Eyre's second directing credit.

== Reception ==
=== Viewers ===
In its original American broadcast on NBC, "Gut Check" was seen by an estimated 3.07 million household viewers with a 0.9/4 in the 18–49 demographics. This means that 0.9 percent of all households with televisions watched the episode, while 4 percent of all of those watching television at the time of the broadcast watched it. This was a 5% increase in viewership from the previous episode, which was watched by an estimated 2.91 million household viewers with a 0.8/3 in the 18–49 demographics.

=== Critical reviews ===
"Gut Check" received critical acclaim. Keith Phipps of The A.V. Club gave the episode an "A–" grade and wrote, "All this is remarkably well handled by all involved. The Vince storyline has burned slowly but intensely all season and it now feels all the more explosive for the time it's taken. Superstars don't become ego casualties overnight. Bonds don't fray quickly and the show has made us feel the strain before the snap. That the show has given no suggestion it will end well makes it all the more effective."

Alan Sepinwall of HitFix wrote, "'Gut Check' is all about reality beating the holy hell out of fantasy, as almost nothing turns out the way our characters have planned it." Ken Tucker of Entertainment Weekly wrote, "one of the things that makes FNL so engrossing is its willingness to go off in all sorts of directions, some of which pay off magnificently, while others pay off aimlessly. Such is life. And TV. This week’s episode, “Gut Check,” took a number of off-the-field swerves that may or may not pay off."

Andy Greenwald of Vulture wrote, "'Gut Check,' while a definite dip in quality from the last few (excellent) episodes, is made considerably worse by sacrificing any shred of gridiron plausibility in pursuit of compelling story." Jen Chaney of The Washington Post wrote, "The Lions managed to squeak out a win, making Luke the hero, but playing the farm boy was clearly a risky move on Eric's part."

Leigh Raines of TV Fanatic gave the episode a 4 star out of 5 rating and wrote, "Things are falling apart for the residents of Dillon, Texas. In "Gut Check" everyone had some sort of assessment or evaluation to make." Television Without Pity gave the episode an "A–" grade.
