= The Right Hand of the Father =

- Friday Night Lights episode
- Episode no.: Season 5 Episode 3
- Directed by: David Boyd
- Written by: Patrick Massett; John Zinman
- Cinematography by: Ian Ellis
- Editing by: Scott Gamzon
- Original release dates: November 10, 2010 (DirecTV); April 29, 2011 (NBC)
- Running time: 43 minutes

Guest appearances
- Brad Leland as Buddy Garrity; Derek Phillips as Billy Riggins; Cress Williams as Ornette Howard; Gil McKinney as Derek Bishop

Episode chronology
| ← Previous "On the Outside Looking In" | Next → "Keep Looking" |
- Friday Night Lights (season 5)

"The Right Hand of the Father" is the third episode of the fifth season of the American sports drama television series Friday Night Lights, inspired by the 1990 nonfiction book by H. G. Bissinger. It is the 66th overall episode of the series and was written by co-executive producers Patrick Massett and John Zinman, and directed by David Boyd. It originally aired on DirecTV's 101 Network on November 10, 2010, before airing on NBC on April 29, 2011.

The series is set in the fictional town of Dillon, a small, close-knit community in rural West Texas. It follows a high school football team, the Dillon Panthers. It features a set of characters, primarily connected to Coach Eric Taylor, his wife Tami, and their daughter Julie. In the episode, Vince is frustrated when his father visits following his release from prison. Meanwhile, the Lions are scolded for a video at the rally party, and Julie continues hanging out with Derek.

According to Nielsen Media Research, the episode was seen by an estimated 2.99 million household viewers and gained a 0.7/2 ratings share among adults aged 18–49. The episode received extremely positive reviews from critics, with major praise towards Vince's storyline.

== Plot ==
Buddy (Brad Leland) inaugurates his bar, Buddy's, after selling the dealership and intends to collect all the footballs that the Lions win for the season. Buddy also expresses frustration that Pam wants to send him Buddy Jr. over some problems at home, angry that she decided to take the custody. Vince (Michael B. Jordan) is told by his mother that his father, Ornette (Cress Williams), is being released from prison on parole but he refuses to see him.

A video goes viral where the Lions take part on the rally girls party, getting some of the girls intoxicated. This causes outrage at the community, with some demanding that the players are expelled. Eric (Kyle Chandler) promises the principal that he will take action and grounds the players by forcing them to perform community service across town. Tami (Connie Britton) holds a special meeting for the rally girls regarding the alcohol use, but no one takes it seriously. Seeing that Jess (Jurnee Smollett) wants to prove something to the team, Tami convinces Eric in getting her as the new equipment manager.

Julie (Aimee Teegarden) is annoyed when Derek (Gil McKinney) gives her a "C–" on a school report. When she questions him, he states that the paper felt "safe" and that she can do better than that. They take a walk through the park, where Derek explains he has problems with his wife. Suddenly, they share a kiss. After having sex, Julie leaves his apartment in the morning. Vince is annoyed when Ornette appears at the house, and his mother wants him to accept his father in the house. As Ornette tries to get more involved in his son's life, Vince finally admonishes him for abandoning his family for a crime life and warns him not to show up at his games. Vince expresses his frustrations to Eric, who comforts him by proclaiming he has nothing to prove.

During the game, the Lions are losing by a touchdown with just one minute remaining. Vince and Luke (Matt Lauria) lead the team to a comeback, giving the Lions their third victory in a row. At the celebration, Buddy calls Pam, telling her to send Buddy Jr. to Dillon. Julie and Derek agree to not say anything about their encounter and to return to their status quo. Vince returns home to find Ornette, who attended the game anyway, packing his stuff and apologizing for missing the past years. He says he is proud of him and leaves the house, as Vince cries.

== Production ==
=== Development ===
The episode was written by co-executive producers Patrick Massett and John Zinman, and directed by David Boyd. This was Massett's tenth writing, Zinman's tenth writing credit, and Boyd's sixth directing credit.

== Reception ==
=== Viewers ===
In its original American broadcast on NBC, "The Right Hand of the Father" was seen by an estimated 2.99 million household viewers with a 0.7/2 in the 18–49 demographics. This means that 0.7 percent of all households with televisions watched the episode, while 2 percent of all of those watching television at the time of the broadcast watched it. This was a 12% decrease in viewership from the previous episode, which was watched by an estimated 3.38 million household viewers with a 0.9/3 in the 18–49 demographics.

=== Critical reviews ===
"The Right Hand of the Father" received extremely positive reviews from critics. Keith Phipps of The A.V. Club gave the episode an "A–" grade and wrote, "Finally, there's Buddy, who learns of trouble with Buddy Jr. and decides to take him in. It's an echo of Vince's relationship with his father, though which will turn out better remains an open question. On the outside, however, everything looks great."

Alan Sepinwall of HitFix wrote, "The Vince stuff was good enough on its own to make “The Right Hand of the Father” the strongest episode of this young season, but I'm still waiting for the show to knock me out for a whole hour the way I know it can." Ken Tucker of Entertainment Weekly wrote, "This was an uneven episode with a number of strikingly good scenes as only FNL can do them. And I don't know about you, but I thought the hour peaked early, with the unexpected verbiage of sweet little Gracie Belle, who burbled, “Think about it, Daddy!”"

Andy Greenwald of Vulture wrote, "Friday Night Lights is good — no, excellent — at a number of things. Among them: lens flares, honest emotional development, and reducing us to quivering, sobbing puddles on the couch. So it feels churlish to point out any flaws in this final season, no matter how slight — especially when the flaws themselves are often in service to the show's strengths." Todd Martens of Los Angeles Times wrote, "After two solid episodes laying the groundwork for the drama to unfold over the course of the next few months, the series was ready to get its hands dirty. No more setting up was needed, and the show’s trademark intimate camera angles were ready to pop in and out of all the various action happening in and around Dillon, paying no heed to hitting every detail."

Leigh Raines of TV Fanatic gave the episode a 3 star out of 5 rating and wrote, "Despite the Lions' victories, I still felt a bit blue after watching. Vince's performance in Coach's office was impressive and probably the best part of the episode. Here's hoping next week will bring us back a little humor and good nature." Television Without Pity gave the episode an "A–" grade.
