= Gut Check =

Gut Check may refer to:

- Gut Check (House), an episode of the TV series House
- Gut Check (NCIS), an episode of the TV series NCIS
- Gut Check (Friday Night Lights), an episode of the TV series Friday Night Lights
- TNA Gut Check, a professional wrestling contest
