= Jason Street =

Fictional character in TV series Friday Night Lights

- Friday Night Lights character
- Scott Porter portrays Jason Street
- First appearance: "Pilot" (episode 1.01)
- Last appearance: "Perfect Record" (episode 5.07)
- Created by: Peter Berg
- Portrayed by: Scott Porter

In-universe information
- Nicknames: Six, Jay (by Tim); Streeter (by Billy); QB (by Herc)
- Gender: Male
- Occupation: Assistant coach of the Dillon Panthers (S1–2); Car salesman (S2); Sports agent (S3–5)
- Family: Mitchell Street (father); Joanne Street (mother)
- Spouses: Erin Street (wife; 1 child)
- Children: Noah Street (son)

Jason Mitchell Street is a fictional character in the NBC/DirecTV (The 101 Network) television drama Friday Night Lights, portrayed by Scott Porter. Introduced as the small town "All-American," Jason is the starting quarterback of the Dillon Panthers, with a promising future career, until an injury during the season-opening football game results in quadriplegia. Jason's story arc is focused on his adjusting to life and carving out a niche for himself outside of Panthers' football. In Season 3, due to Porter leaving the show, Jason moves to New York City after landing an entry-level position at a sports agency to be near his infant son.

The character is inspired by the real-life events in the career of David Edwards, a high school player in San Antonio, Texas.

== Background ==
Jason is portrayed as a confident, affable, charismatic and popular all-American high school student from a middle-class home with loving and supportive, although sometimes over-protective, parents. He is presumably the only child of Mitchell and Joanne Street (there is no mention of siblings). He, Landry and Julie Taylor are the only original main characters in high school who come from stable, two-parent families, in contrast to the others, all of whom come from divorced or single-parent homes or families with absent parental figures. Of the adult characters in the show, Jason is closest to Coach Taylor, who coached him since elementary school and was his position coach in high school, and often seeks his advice.

Despite his social status as a jock and star quarterback, he is well-liked by everyone, young and old, in both his school and the community (including the notoriously difficult and loud-mouthed Buddy Garrity). Tim Riggins once called him "the heart" of the Panthers team and as the season progresses, it becomes apparent that he still commanded his former teammates' respect and loyalty, even from his wheelchair.

Jason is best friends with Tim Riggins, his fullback. They have known each other, and Jason's (ex) girlfriend Lyla Garrity, since middle school. Throughout the show they are seen supporting each other almost unconditionally and bailing one another out of trouble. Prior to his injury, Jason was dating Lyla Garrity, who was then captain of the cheerleading team, and had an on-off relationship and brief engagement before circumstances led them to break up for good. Their friendship is tested in Season 1 when Tim sleeps with Lyla to cope with his feelings of guilt and self-hatred as he felt he could have prevented Jason's injury by tackling the defensive player before Jason did. In Season 2, they are on speaking terms and still good friends.

== Character ==
Early in season 1, it is established that Jason is a seventeen-year-old high school senior at Dillon High School and by Season 3 he is around age twenty. Throughout the season, he is seen supporting the Panthers, be it from his hospital bed or by personally coaching his successor Matt Saracen before practices. Whether Jason completed high school was left ambiguous, although Mrs. Taylor makes a brief mention of Jason having only a few classes left to graduate, but actor Scott Porter clarified during the cast Q&A session at the Museum of Television & Radio at the conclusion of season 1 that Jason did get his GED.

== Storylines ==
=== Season 1 ===
Jason begins the series as the senior starting quarterback of the Dillon Panthers. He is ranked as one of the top high school quarterbacks in the nation, with a scholarship offer to the University of Notre Dame, but during the first game of the season he suffers a severe spinal cord injury while successfully tackling a defender in what would have been a game-ending touchdown. He was diagnosed with a spinal cord injury at the C-7 and T-1 level, rendering him paralyzed from the chest down with use of his arms and hands and limited use of his fingers. In season 1, the character goes through a period of adjustment as he comes to terms with his disability and the fact that his life no longer revolves around playing football.

For some time, Tim Riggins, Jason's best friend, blames himself for not blocking the hit that paralyzes Jason and he avoids visiting Jason at the hospital for almost six weeks. During Jason's hospital stay, his girlfriend, Lyla, begins an affair with Tim. The two manage to hide the affair until Jason sees them in an intimate moment and eventually figures out what is going on. He confronts Lyla about it, but she lies and says she is not cheating on him. Jason, however, is not convinced and he slugs Tim and challenges him to a fight, a fight that Tim walks away from out of shame and guilt over his actions. After word of the incident gets to the team, several Panthers players loyal to Jason ambush Tim in his truck one night and smash out the windows with baseball bats even though Jason clarifies that Tim did not physically hurt him in any way. Jason tries his best to hate Lyla for her part in the affair, but comes to admit that he still loves her and proposes to her. Lyla says yes, but the relationship quickly begins to fall apart. After catching Jason with another woman, Lyla breaks off the engagement, ending their relationship for good.

While in rehab, Jason's roommate, Herc, harasses and pushes him to the edge, trying to get a depressed Jason fired up. Herc then introduces him to the "future": wheelchair rugby. Having something to strive for, Jason focuses solely on becoming the best player he can and manages to get an invitation to try out for the U.S. National Quad Rugby Team. Putting school on hold, he spends two weeks pushing himself and showing everyone what he can do. He initially has difficulty readjusting upon returning home – dealing with his feelings of inferiority and getting used to being stared at – and takes out his anger and bitterness on his mom and Lyla. When selection time comes, he is disappointed when he is not chosen to join the team and go to Beijing. While he is nursing his wounds over not being chosen for the team, Herc informs him that the only reason he was not chosen was his lack of experience with his wheelchair.

In the meantime, Jason discovers through the local daily that his parents have brought a lawsuit against Coach Taylor for not properly training him how to tackle someone - an activity quarterbacks generally do not have to do. Many in the town do not like this, particularly Jason, who privately tells Coach Taylor that he never wanted it to happen this way. But because of the financial burden on his parents over his medical expenses, Jason goes along with it. Things become awkward, albeit not tense, between him and Coach Taylor for a while as a result. At home, there is tension between his parents as they disagree over the decision to sue Taylor and the settlement amount. When the next settlement hearing is called, their attorney suggests wheeling Jason up to the stand to play on the jury's sympathies, to which Jason snaps that he does not want to be put on display "like some brain dead idiot" who is no longer capable of fending for himself. He puts an end to the lawsuit and writes out an undisclosed amount, which he says is enough to cover his parents' mortgage and debt incurred by his medical expenses, to which the school officials agree.

Prior to the semi-finals for the state championship, Jason, now focused for the first time in a long time, takes it upon himself to mentor his replacement, Matt Saracen, after the latter confides that he is having confidence issues prior to the state semifinal against the Brant Vikings. During the rain-soaked semifinal, Coach Taylor notices Matt's improvement in his play after receiving advice from Jason, who is present at the sidelines, and offers Jason a position as an assistant. Jason is instrumental in the Panthers' winning the State Championship and the first season ends with Jason giving the team a pep talk about preparing for the next season.

=== Season 2 ===
Jason spends the beginning of the second season as an assistant to the Panthers' new head coach Bill McGregor, but leaves after the first game as he did not agree with Coach McGregor's style and favoritism toward and over-reliance on Brian "Smash" Williams. When McGregor dismisses his suggestions, Jason quits the team as he feels conflicted about McGregor's authoritarian approach. After Coach Taylor returns from TMU, Jason returns to the team briefly on Taylor's request but confides to Lyla that he feels "stuck." He eventually decides to move on and makes a clean break from his past "glory years" by quitting the team and donating all his old tapes to the athletic department.

Jason regains feeling back in his right hand and learns of a dangerous experimental surgery being conducted by a clinic in Mexico that can possibly help him walk again. The risky surgery worries Tim after he learns that the procedure is not FDA approved and that Jason can potentially die. He calls Lyla for help after failing to dissuade Jason from following through with the surgery. During a private boat ride, the two confront Jason and try to talk him out of the surgery, but Jason does not listen and tells both of them he is tired of being stuck in a wheelchair and does not care if he dies during the surgery. He then proceeds to jump off the boat. While in the water and swimming ashore, he finally realizes the mistake he is making and tells Tim and Lyla that he wants to go home, much to their relief.

After returning from Mexico, he convinces his over-protective and well-meaning parents to allow him to move in with Herc. He later works at Buddy Garrity's car dealership as a salesman.

Later in the season, Jason meets a waitress named Erin during a blind date gone bad. The two end up sleeping together, which results in Erin becoming pregnant. The season ends with Jason convincing her to keep the baby after having been previously told by doctors that his injury would prevent him from being able to conceive a child. Erin remains skeptical as they are both only nineteen and she needs to keep her job as a waitress.

=== Season 3 ===
Season 3 picks up almost a year later. Erin has given birth to a baby boy named Noah. Jason is shown to be a great father and has come to love Erin very much. However, Erin becomes wary of Jason's ability to support her and Noah, especially when Jason says he wants to get in the highly-risky business of 'flipping' houses. He, Herc and the Riggins brothers buy Buddy Garrity's old house, to fix up and successfully sell. Despite this, Erin tells Jason that she cannot support herself and Noah living in Dillon and intends to move back to New Jersey with her parents and raise their son there, although reassuring Jason that he is welcome to visit anytime.

Jason meets Grant, a sports agent, at Dillon High School during practice one day, who gives Jason his card and tells him to look him up whenever he is in New York City. However, the sports agent only gives Jason his card because he (the agent) was trying to sign Jason's former Panthers teammate, Wendell Foley, now a college football star. Jason misinterprets the statement and goes to New York with Tim, believing he will land a job at the agency and provide support and stay in Erin and Noah's lives. The agent, surprised to see him, tells Jason that he has graduates from Ivy League schools fighting to get into the firm daily, and that he must maintain quotas just to keep his own job. Furthermore, Foley has decided to sign with a different agent.

In an effort to prove himself, Jason convinces Foley to sign with the agency. Jason shows up at Grant's office with Foley in tow and receives an entry-level job as a result. After that, he goes to Erin's home in New Jersey and tells her that he has found a job in New York so he can be close to her and Noah and is willing to find a place that's "far enough away that I'm not going to be a stalker...but close enough that I can be here.". Erin happily agrees, saying that she has missed him.

=== Season 5 ===
In "Perfect Record," Jason returns to Dillon and meets his former mentor Coach Taylor to see if he is interested in taking a college coaching job, which the Coach politely turns down. He updates Coach Taylor on his life so far: he and Erin have since married, Noah is now a toddler and is learning how to throw a football, Erin wants to have another child (after some convincing) and, recently, he was promoted to a full-fledged sports agent. Later he drops by East Dillon to watch a practice session and Vince Howard's father, Ornette, is seen standing at the sidelines over-enthusiastically trying to convince Jason to look at Vince and recommend him to top colleges, much to Jason and Coach Taylor's concern. While supportive of Taylor, his former coach at West Dillon, Street comes to the rivalry game supporting the Dillon Panthers, having been the former starting quarterback there, and is seen doing the pre-game chant. He shows displeasure when the East Dillon Lions run up the score against the Panthers.

Jason is briefly mentioned in the next several episodes as he has recommended Coach Taylor to a state university in Florida, who decides to pursue Taylor and tries to (unsuccessfully) convince him to sign with them. In the series ending montage in "Always," the words "J.Street" are seen written below the 'P' in the Dillon Panthers' locker room.

== Reception ==
Porter was praised by paralyzed viewers of the show for his "inspiring and believable" portrayal of a quadriplegic in the first season when Jason is first injured and then endures several months in rehab. A former high school football player himself, Porter stated in an interview with TV Guide that he had visited a spinal cord injury rehabilitation facility in Austin, Texas to do research on his character.
