= Tim Riggins =

Fictional character in TV series Friday Night Lights

- Friday Night Lights character
- Taylor Kitsch as Tim Riggins
- First appearance: "Pilot"
- Last appearance: "Always"
- Portrayed by: Taylor Kitsch

In-universe information
- Occupation: High school student and starting fullback/running back of the Dillon Panthers (seasons 1-3); College student at San Antonio State University (season 4); Mechanic (season 4); Assistant coach of the East Dillon Lions (season 4); Bartender at Buddy's Bar (season 5)
- Family: Walt Riggins (Father); Unnamed mother Billy Riggins (Brother); Mindy Riggins (Sister-in-law); Steven Riggins (nephew)
- Significant others: Tyra Collette (ex-girlfriend); Lyla Garrity (ex-girlfriend)

Timothy "Tim" Riggins is a character in the American sports drama Friday Night Lights, portrayed by actor Taylor Kitsch. Tim Riggins is the fullback/running back of the Dillon Panthers, a high school team in a small Texas town in the television series. His character is similar to that of Don Billingsley from the original book and the 2004 film Friday Night Lights.

== Portrayal ==
Actor Taylor Kitsch says he is able to relate to the character of Tim Riggins based on his own personal experiences. "My father is out of my life, more or less", he revealed in an interview, "so I discover stuff that maybe I wasn't even dealing with as a person." Also, his background as a young and promising athlete helped him connect with the role. Nevertheless, he admits to differ from his character at least in his relations with the opposite sex; "...I didn't have as many girls at my fingertips. I don't know many guys who do!"

== Background ==
Throughout the series, Tim lives with his older brother Billy after having been abandoned by both their parents. Billy was about to obtain his PGA Tour card and pursue a professional golf career when their father Walt left, and Billy became the sole guardian of his younger brother. Despite their seemingly immature behavior and Tim's stoic and uncaring facade, the brothers are shown to be caring and loyal to each other in times of crisis. Tim is best friends with his quarterback, Jason Street, whom he has known since he was young. Their catchphrase is "Texas Forever".

== Characterization ==
Tim has been described as a character "who has puppy-dog, lady-killing eyes under his scraggly bangs." He is the fullback/running back of the Dillon Panthers with jersey #33. Tim is depicted as a womanizer sleeping with numerous women from his high school, including half of the rally girls, and even some of the female booster club members think he is hot. His ex-girlfriends include Tyra Collette and Lyla Garrity, with whom he has an off and on relationship. Described as the town drunk of the series, he copes with life through casual sex and heavy drinking. Despite his laissez-faire attitude, he is extremely loyal to his teammates when the occasion demands, as shown when he physically hits an opposition player who verbally provokes his black teammate, Smash Williams, and puts his Panthers career on the line to follow best friend, Jason Street, to Mexico to talk him out of a potentially life-threatening situation.

In season 1, Coach Taylor's wife discovers that Tim has been struggling academically and had been asking his schoolmates (especially the rally girls) to do his assignments for him. She pairs him up with Landry, who subsequently finds out that Tim has difficulty reading and writing (presumably dyslexia). Landry reads that week's assigned reading Of Mice and Men out loud to him, and it is shown that Tim can comprehend the material better and even scored a B− on his assignment.

Tim and Jason drift apart for a while after Jason discovers that Tim has been sleeping with his girlfriend, Lyla Garrity, to cope with his guilt over Jason's accident. By season 3, they are back to being friends and Tim is he one who accompanies Jason on his journey to New York; he is the last to bid Jason farewell. Through all the ups and downs, they remain almost unconditionally supportive of each other and are often seen helping one another out or coming to one another's rescue.

Of the original main characters with whom he went to school, Tim is the only one who has stayed living in Dillon at the end of the series. Riggins signs to play football at the fictional San Antonio State University, but after a short period of time, he decides that college is a waste of time for him and moves back to Dillon.

== Storylines ==
=== Season one ===
In season one, Tim is shown being unable to cope with his best friend, star quarterback Jason Street's, accident, blaming himself for not being there to block the hit that Jason takes. At the start of the series he is dating Tyra Collette, though they both repeatedly cheat on one another. After Tyra breaks up with him, he begins sleeping with his best friend's girlfriend, Lyla Garrity. After Lyla calls off their affair, Tim goes on to stand by her and encourage her to stay with cheerleading even after their relationship is discovered and she becomes a social outcast. In the back half of season one, Tim becomes close to his neighbour, Jackie, and her young son, Bo. The two have an affair, but she eventually breaks up with him as he is much younger than she is.

Billy begins to take Tim seriously as a football player in season one, talking to coach Taylor about a potential scholarship for Tim.

Tim also reunites with his absentee father this season, tracking him down after receiving a traffic ticket that may result in the loss of his license without a parent's signature. He learns that his alcoholic father is now sober.

=== Season two ===
In season two, Tim discovers that Jackie and his older brother, Billy, are in a serious relationship. He then travels to Mexico with Jason to support him while he undergoes an experimental surgery involving shark's blood and stem cells. After learning that Jason could die on the operating table he enlists the help of their ex-girlfriend, Lyla, and the two convince Jason to give up on the procedure.

Upon his return, Tim learns that he has been kicked off of the Panthers after his week long absence. He is later able to rejoin the team after showing his commitment by showing up to practice and apologizing to the members of his team.

Because he is unwilling to live with Billy as long as Billy is in a relationship with his ex, Jackie, Tim ends up briefly living with Tyra. He then moves in with a meth dealer and his ferrets only to leave once the meth dealer wakes him up one day with a gun to his face. After leaving the meth house, he moves in with Coach Taylor. He is kicked out of the Taylor residence after Coach Taylor sees Tim putting a drunken Julie in her bed and misinterprets the situation. Upon his return home he discovers that Billy and Jackie have broken up and Jackie is moving away. When Coach Taylor learns the truth behind Julie's stupor, he goes to the Riggins' household to apologize to Tim, also giving him respect for taking the blame and protecting Julie, along with not complaining once after given such menial tasks after being let back on the team.

Tim also begins to more seriously pursue Lyla, showing up at her church and vowing to do whatever it takes to get her to go out with him.

=== Season three ===
At the start of season three, Tim and Lyla are already in a relationship. He is also moved from fullback to tailback due to Smash's graduating. Friction occurs between the couple when Tim, now a senior, begins to attract serious interest from various colleges. Lyla encourages Tim to pursue a scholarship while Tim refuses to take the recruiters seriously. Billy is concerned about Tim's future as he wants Tim to go to college and make something of himself, something that Billy himself never got to achieve, and asks Jason for help. They put together a highlight reel to send to recruiters. He also enters in a business venture flipping houses with his brother, Billy, his best friend, Jason, and Jason's friend, Herc. He later accompanies Jason to New York City where he helps him get a job as a sports agent and reunite with the mother of his child. Tim is then pursued by the fictional San Antonio State, and signs with them, becoming the first member of the Riggins family to attend college.

=== Season four ===
Upon graduation from high school, Tim attends the fictional San Antonio State University, for a short time where he plays football before dropping out, realizing that it was never part of his plans. After returning to Dillon, he finds that he can no longer stay with his older brother since Billy is focusing on building a life with his pregnant wife, Mindy, Tyra's older sister. After a one-night stand with a bartender, Cheryl (Alicia Witt), he moves into a trailer on her property where he frequently finds himself entangled with her teenager daughter, Becky.

He also finds himself volunteer coaching with Coach Taylor and the East Dillon Lions. One notable moment was when Tim and Billy were helping the Lions with a newly developed play by attending a practice in full pads. The jersey Tim was wearing suggests that he achieved All-American status during his tenure with the Dillon Panthers. Tim briefly reunites with Lyla, who has started attending college in Vanderbilt. While Tim still holds feelings for Lyla, he realizes he cannot keep her due to her own aspirations. The two part ways at a bus station.

Tim and his brother Billy operate an auto body shop, "Riggins' Rigs". Pressure mounts on Billy to provide for his pregnant wife, Mindy, and he agrees to turn his shop into a chop shop to earn more money. After Tim discovers Billy's secret operation, he supports it all the way, so he can make enough money to buy a plot of land he had set his eyes on. The police discover their scheme and arrest Tim. In the season four finale, "Thanksgiving," Tim realizes that his brother needs to stay and provide for his family and turns himself in to the sheriff's office and takes full responsibility for the chop shop, since he agreed to it all.

=== Season five ===
Tim is seen briefly in jail at the beginning of the first episode of season five, and returns in the final four episodes of the series. In the episode, "Don't Go", Tim's parole hearing takes place with Billy, Coach Taylor, and Buddy Garrity all speaking on Tim's behalf. Tim is released from prison and over the next few episodes, tries to figure out what he will do with his life. He is uncharacteristically harsh and bitter. He is angry at Billy, because he feels that Billy has not done everything that he could to get his life in order. He declares that he is going to sell his property and eventually move to Alaska to work on pipelines. Unsure of what his own future will be, he helps Becky come to terms with her life and is given a job by Buddy Garrity. Eventually, he reconciles with Billy and resolves that he wants to stay in Dillon.

Tim's final scene in the series shows him and Billy building Tim's home on his property. They both toast each other stating "Texas Forever," mirroring Tim and Jason Street's quote in the pilot episode.

== Reception ==
Critical reception of the Riggins character has been varied. Variety magazine opined that "there may be no more compelling, tortured soul on the "FNL" roster than Riggins". Scott Tobias, on the other hand, writing for The A.V. Club, had less enthusiasm for the character. According to Tobias, "he gives you the poses of a hunky, smoldering, haunted young man, but rarely the three-dimensional, flesh-and-bone reality of it." In June 2010, Entertainment Weekly ranked Tim Riggins as number 100 of their "100 Greatest Characters of the Last 20 Years."
