= Emily Rios =

American actress (born 1989)

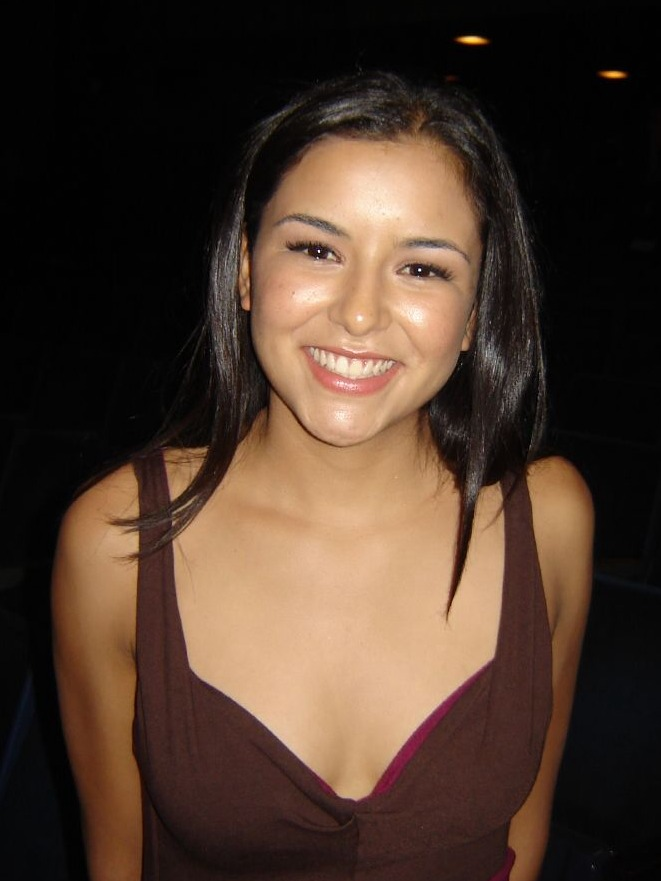
- Rios in 2006
- Born: April 27, 1989 (age 37)
- Occupation: Actress
- Years active: 2005–present

Emily Rios (Spanish: Ríos; born April 27, 1989) is an American actress. She is best known for her role as Andrea Cantillo on the AMC series Breaking Bad. In 2013, she began portraying newspaper reporter Adriana Mendez on the FX series The Bridge. She also appeared as Lucía Villanueva in the FX drama Snowfall.

== Early life ==
Emilly Rios was born on April 27, 1989. She is of Mexican descent and was raised as a Jehovah's Witness.

== Career ==
Rios was professionally discovered during a day out at a shopping mall. She appeared in the 2005 short film For Them and the 2006 film Quinceañera. In 2008, she appeared in the independent film Vicious Circle. She has also had recurring roles in the television series Friday Night Lights, Men of a Certain Age, Breaking Bad, The Bridge and From Dusk till Dawn: The Series. She portrayed Lucia Villanueva, the daughter of a Mexican crime boss, on the drama Snowfall, which debuted on FX on July 5, 2017. She departed the show after the second season, and made no return appearances for the remainder of the show.

== Personal life ==
Rios came out as a lesbian in 2014.

== Filmography ==
=== Film ===
Year	Title	Role	Notes
2005	For Them	Lydia	Short film
2006	Quinceañera	Magdalena	
2007	The Blue Hour	Happy	
2007	The Stain on the Sidewalk	Vanessa	
2008	Vicious Circle	Angel	
2009	Down for Life	Vanessa	
2009	The Winning Season	Kathy Reyes	
2010	Love Ranch	Muneca	
2010	Pete Smalls Is Dead	Xan	
2011	Big Mommas: Like Father, Like Son	Isabelle	
2016	Paint It Black	Pen	
2018	If Beale Street Could Talk	Victoria Rogers	

=== Television ===
Year	Title	Role	Notes
2007	ER	Tracy Martinez	Episode: "Under the Influence"
2008	The Closer	Elena Contreras	Episode: "Sudden Death"
2008	House	Sophia Velez	Episode: "Emancipation"
2009–2011	Men of a Certain Age	Maria	12 episodes
2010–2011	Friday Night Lights	Epyck Sanders	4 episodes
2010–2013	Breaking Bad	Andrea Cantillo	10 episodes
2012–2013	Private Practice	Angela Reilly	3 episodes
2013–2014	The Bridge	Adriana Mendez	23 episodes
2013	Almost Human	Paige Hernandez	Episode: "Are You Receiving?"
2014	Grimm	Frankie Gonzales	Episode: "The Good Soldier"
2015	Scandal	Ensign Martin	Episode: "A Few Good Women"
2015	True Detective	Betty Chessani	3 episodes
2015	Criminal Minds	Tammy Vasquez	Episode: "Outlaw"
2015	From Dusk till Dawn	Lorena Vasconcelos	Episode: "Santa Sangre"
2016	From Dusk till Dawn	Ximena Vasconcelos	5 episodes
2016	The Infamous	Alice Calderon	Unsold pilot
2017–2018	Snowfall	Lucia Villanueva	20 episodes
