= Michael Waxman =

American film producer

- Died: 04/07/2025
- Occupations: Film director, film producer, television director, television producer
- Years active: 1984–2025

Michael Waxman was an American director and producer of film and television. He was best known for his collaborations with film director Michael Mann, as well as for directing episodes of Friday Night Lights, Trauma, The Event and Prime Suspect.

== Life and career ==
Waxman was raised in Brooklyn, New York and is a graduate of Brooklyn College.

In film, he worked as an assistant director for every film directed by Michael Mann, dating back to Manhunter (1986).

His other film credits as an assistant director include When Harry Met Sally... (1989), Drop Dead Fred (1991), Highway to Hell (1992), Rudy (1993), Monkey Trouble (1994) and producing and assistant directing the films A Low Down Dirty Shame (1994). Celtic Pride (1996) and Metro (1997).

In 2006, Waxman became an assistant director on the television series Friday Nights Lights. He made the head directorial debut of his career on that series in 2008 going on to direct eleven episodes including the series finale. In 2011, he was nominated for a Primetime Emmy Award for his work on the series as a producer.

His other television directing credits include Trauma, Parenthood, Breakout Kings, The Event, Prime Suspect, Awake, Grimm, Once Upon a Time, 12 Monkeys and Chicago Med.

== Personal life ==
Waxman met his wife Linda on set of the film Manhunter. They married in 1988.
