= Gil McKinney =

American actor

- McKinney in 2026
- Born: February 5, 1979 (age 47); Houston, Texas, U.S.
- Years active: 2003–present
- Children: 2

Mark Gilbert McKinney, known professionally as Gil McKinney, (born February 5, 1979) is an American film and television actor.

He is best known for playing Dr. Paul Grady on ER, Derek Bishop on Friday Night Lights, and Prince Eric in Once Upon a Time, and for being the voice and face (via MotionScan) of Jack Kelso in the video game L.A. Noire. Gil also appeared in Supernatural and its spinoff The Winchesters as Henry Winchester.

== Filmography ==
=== Film ===
Year	Title	Role
2003	Jeepers Creepers 2	Team member
2004	Elvis Has Left the Building	Young Elvis
2007	Witches' Night	Jim
2009	The Grudge 3	Max
2012	Hitchcock	Reporter #2
2014	Behaving Badly	Officer Joe Tackett

=== Television ===
Year	Title	Role	Notes
2003	The Brotherhood of Poland, New Hampshire	Joel Nudnick	2 episodes
2003	NCIS	Crewman	Episode: "High Seas"
2004	The District	Dave #3	Episode: "Breath of Life"
2005	Night Stalker	Jack Mercer	Episode: "Three"
2006	The Loop	Matt	Episode: "Bear Drop Soup"
2006	Just Legal	Sean Walker	Episode: "Body in the Trunk"
2006	Women in Law	James	Episode: "Pilot"
2007	Ghost Whisperer	Pvt. Jackson Reynolds	Episode: "Delia's First Ghost"
2007	Saving Grace	Clifford Durkin	Episode: "Bless Me, Father, for I Have Sinned"
2007–2009	ER	Dr. Paul Grady	23 episodes
2008	CSI: Crime Scene Investigation	Martin Davlin	1 episode
2008	Without a Trace	Julian Simonson	Episode: "Satellites"
2010	Castle	Tyler Benton	Episode: "The Mistress Always Spanks Twice"
2010	Past Life	Owen Grusin	Episode: "Gone Daddy Gone"
2010–2011	Friday Night Lights	Derek Bishop	6 episodes
2010	The Mentalist	Sean Meyers	1 episode
2011	Drop Dead Diva	Ben Logan	1 episode
2012	Grey's Anatomy	Chris	1 episode
2012	Major Crimes	Tom Ross	Episode: "Medical Causes"
2013	Masters of Sex	Charles	Episode: "Involuntary"
2013	Perception	Bryan Murphy	2 episodes
2013–2014	Supernatural	Henry Winchester	2 episodes
2013–2017	Once Upon a Time	Prince Eric	4 episodes
2014	Beauty & the Beast	Deputy Lewis	Episode: "Ever After"
2015	Party Monsters	'Erik' The Phantom	Television film
2016	Criminal Minds: Beyond Borders	John Davis	Episode: "Love Interpreted"
2016–2017	Kings of Con	Chip	5 episodes; webseries
2020	The Rookie	Barry Langley	Episode: "Casualties"
2022	The Winchesters	Henry Winchester	Episodes: "Pilot" (Voice Only), "Reflections"

=== Video Game ===
Year	Title	Role	Notes
2011	L.A. Noire	Jack Kelso	Also motion capture
