= Stacey Oristano =

American actress

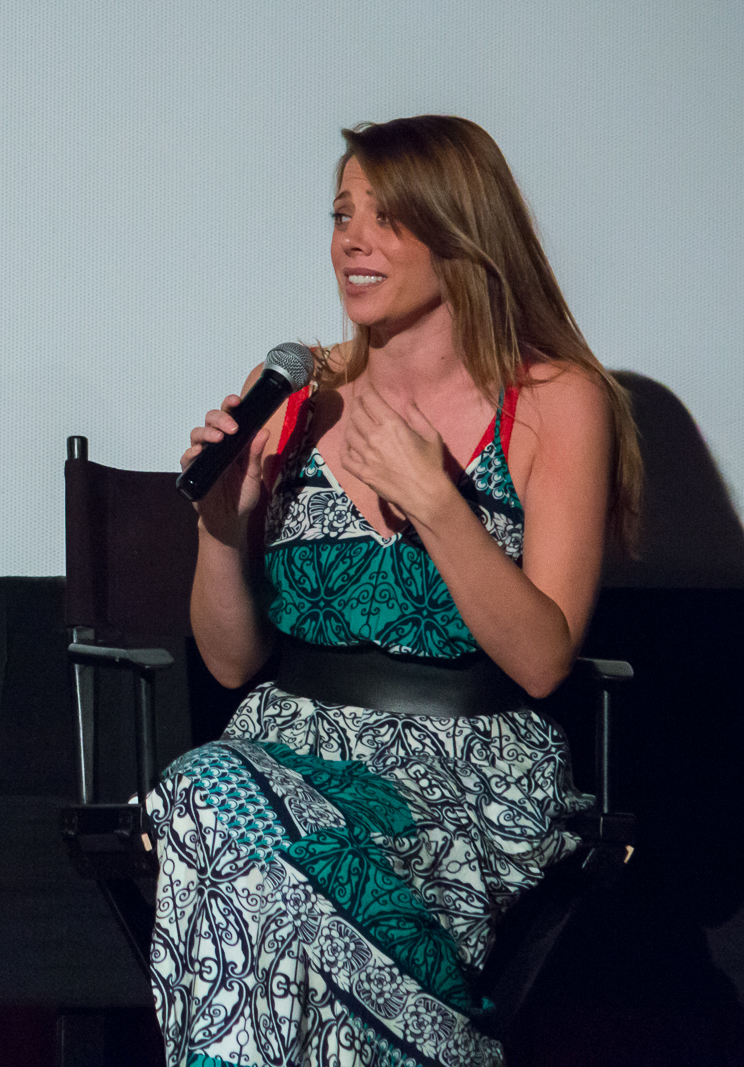
- Oristano at ATX Television Festival in June 2015
- Born: May 6, 1979 (age 47); Arlington, Texas, United States
- Education: Rose Bruford College
- Occupation: Actress
- Years active: 2003–present

Stacey Oristano (born May 6, 1979) is an American stage, screen and television actress. She is best known for her role as Mindy Riggins on the television series Friday Night Lights and for starring on ABC Family's Bunheads as Truly Stone.

== Career ==
As a stage and screen actor, Stacey Oristano graduated from Rose Bruford College in London. After graduation she was seen in the West End production of Steel Magnolias (as Annelle). She then moved to New York City, where she toured with Cabaret (as Sally Bowles). Regionally she has performed in Urinetown (as Hope Cladwell); The Spitfire Grill (as Percy Talbot); The Wild Party (as Queenie); and numerous others. She is also a seasoned concert vocalist, having sung in concerts in London, New York, and Dallas. While in New York, Stacey was seen on Chappelle's Show and Tough Crowd with Colin Quinn.

For her best known role, she starred as stripper Mindy Collette-Riggins on the critically acclaimed Friday Night Lights. Initially a minor recurring role, as the series progressed, the character was included into the show's storylines, especially in the last two seasons. She currently hosts the rewatch podcast "Clear Eyes, Full Hearts" with Derek Phillips, who played Billy Riggins (Tim Riggins' older brother, whom Mindy eventually married).

She starred in Amy Sherman-Palladino's Bunheads as Truly Stone, the unhinged Sparkles clothing boutique owner and close friend to Fanny and Michelle.

In January 2015, she replaced Mary Birdsong as Jackie in the off-Broadway production of Disaster!.

== Filmography ==
=== Film ===
| Year | Title | Role | Notes |
|---|---|---|---|
| 2011 | Hitting on Destiny | Destiny | Short Film |
| 2013 | Crazy Kind of Love | Jenny | Uncredited |
| 2013 | Flash in the Pan | Jamie | Short Film |
| 2014 | Sons of the Devil | Melissa | Short Film |
| 2017 | 2020 | Kate | |
| 2018 | Waterlily Jaguar | Wilhelmina | |
| 2018 | Doe | Hollie | |
| 2019 | Low Low | Pharmacist | |

=== Television ===
| Year | Title | Role | Notes |
|---|---|---|---|
| 2004 | Tough Crowd with Colin Quinn | French Girl | Episode #1.201 |
| 2006 | xxxHolic | High School Girl | 2 episodes; American dub |
| 2006 | Ouran High School Host Club | Additional Cast / Additional Voices | 6 episodes; American dub |
| 2006 | School Rumble | Toki / Toikio | 9 episodes; American dub |
| 2006 | Ghost Hunt | Dream Girl / Girl Student B / Girl A | 4 episodes; American dub |
| 2006–2007 | Sasami: Magical Girls Club | Honoka Iwakura | 19 episodes; American dub |
| 2006–2011 | Friday Night Lights | Mindy Collette-Riggins | Recurring role; 45 episodes |
| 2007 | Crayon Shin-chan | Miss Noriti | 5 episodes |
| 2009 | CSI: Crime Scene Investigation | Diana | Episode: "The Gone Dead Train" |
| 2010 | Funny or Die Presents | Miss Patrick | 2 episodes |
| 2011 | Criminal Minds | Anisa Gold | Episode: "Sense Memory" |
| 2011–2012 | #nitTWITS | Lillian / Margaret | 2 episodes; web series |
| 2012 | In Plain Sight | Eve Wilson | Episode: "The Merry Wives of Witsec" |
| 2012–2013 | Bunheads | Truly Stone | Main role |
| 2012 | My Synthesized Life | Karen | 2 episodes |
| 2014 | Status: Unknown | Jessica | TV movie |
| 2016 | Gilmore Girls: A Year in the Life | Allie | Episode: "Fall" |
| 2018 | Shameless | Trina | 4 episodes |
| 2018 | Grey's Anatomy | Nurse Frankie | 3 episodes |
| 2021 | Bull | Monica Miller | 1 episode |
| 2023 | Kaleidoscope | Mrs. Barbara Loomis | 3 episodes |

=== Theater ===
| Year | Title | Role | Notes |
|---|---|---|---|
| 2015 | Disaster! | Jackie | Off Broadway |

=== Podcast appearances ===
| Year | Podcast | Role | Notes |
|---|---|---|---|
| 2015 | Gilmore Guys | Herself | 4 episodes |
