= Andy Greenwald =

American journalist (born 1977)

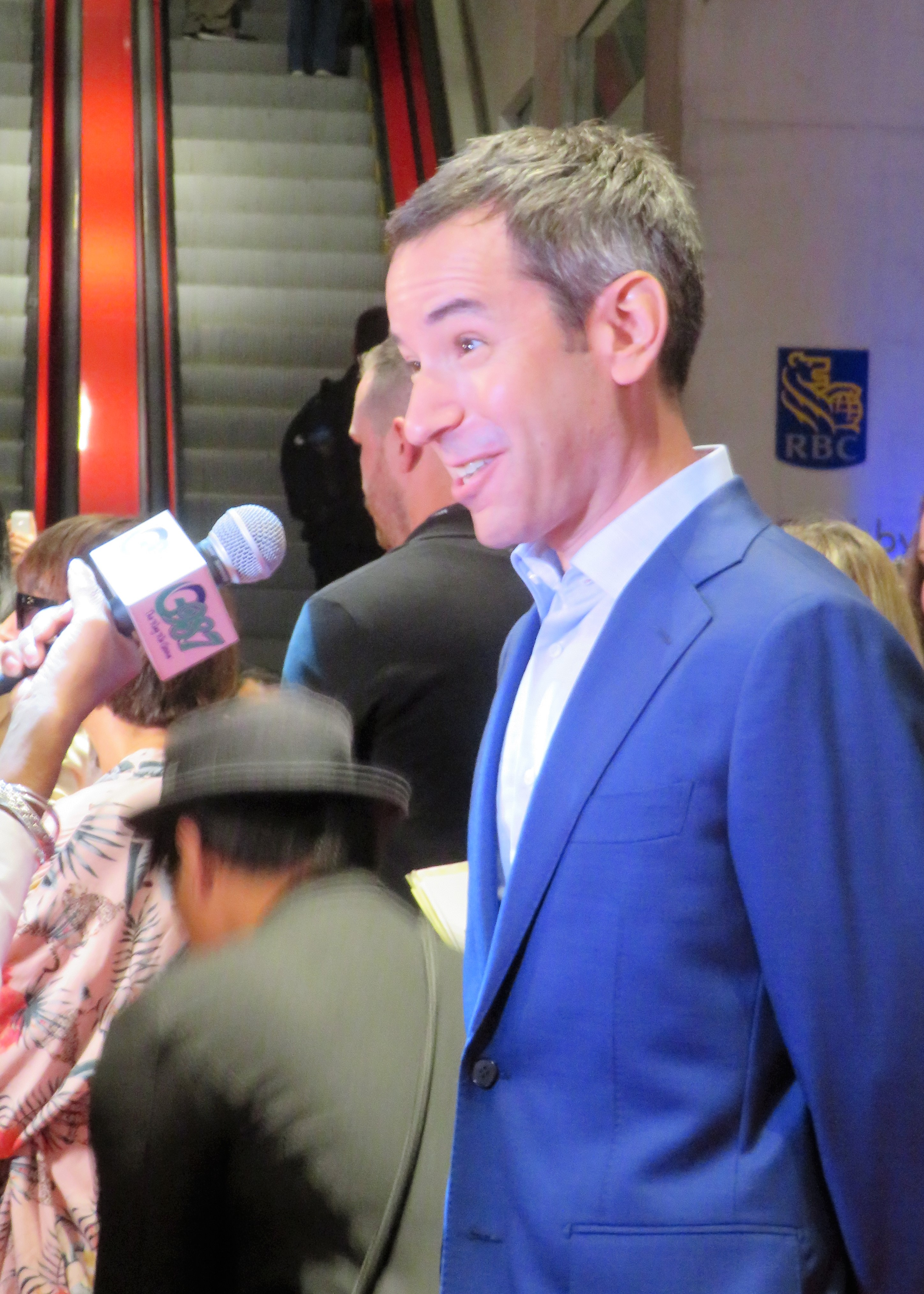
- Born: May 19, 1977 (age 49); Philadelphia, Pennsylvania
- Education: Brown University, AB
- Occupations: Author, screenwriter, podcast host
- Children: 2
- Writing career
- Subjects: Music, Television
- Website: web.archive.org/web/20051214161029/http://www.andygreenwald.com:80/

Andy Greenwald (born May 19, 1977) is an American author, critic, podcaster, screenwriter, and television producer.

== Life and career ==
Greenwald grew up in Philadelphia and currently lives in Los Angeles, California. He graduated from Friends' Central School in Philadelphia and Brown University in Providence. He is married to an attorney and has two daughters. Greenwald made a Twin Peaks fanzine in middle school.

Greenwald was a senior contributing writer at Spin, and has also written for such publications as The Washington Post, Blender, Entertainment Weekly, The Village Voice, MTV Magazine, Complex, and Magnet. He is the author of the books Nothing Feels Good: Punk Rock, Teenagers, and Emo and Miss Misery: A Novel.

From 2011 to 2015, he was a staff writer and principal TV writer for Bill Simmons' ESPN website Grantland. During his time at Grantland, he began podcasting with his best friend and pop culture writer Chris Ryan, hosting both the Andy Greenwald Podcast and the Hollywood Prospectus Podcast. Once Grantland closed and Simmons started The Ringer in Los Angeles, both Greenwald and Ryan began co-hosting The Watch on the new site's podcast network. In 2016, he and Ryan began hosting the Game of Thrones aftershow After the Thrones on HBO, as well as the Mr Robot aftershow Hacking Robot on USA Network.

Beginning in 2016, Greenwald worked on the superhero TV show Legion. In 2018, Greenwald and Sam Esmail's adaptation of the Ross Thomas book Briarpatch was ordered to series on USA Network. Greenwald was both a writer and executive producer on the show, which starred Rosario Dawson. The show was cancelled after one season.

It was reported that Greenwald was part of a writer's room for a new Star Wars project. In late 2024, Greenwald joined the writer's room for HBO's upcoming TV series Harry Potter.
