= Matt Lauria =

American actor and musician (born 1982)

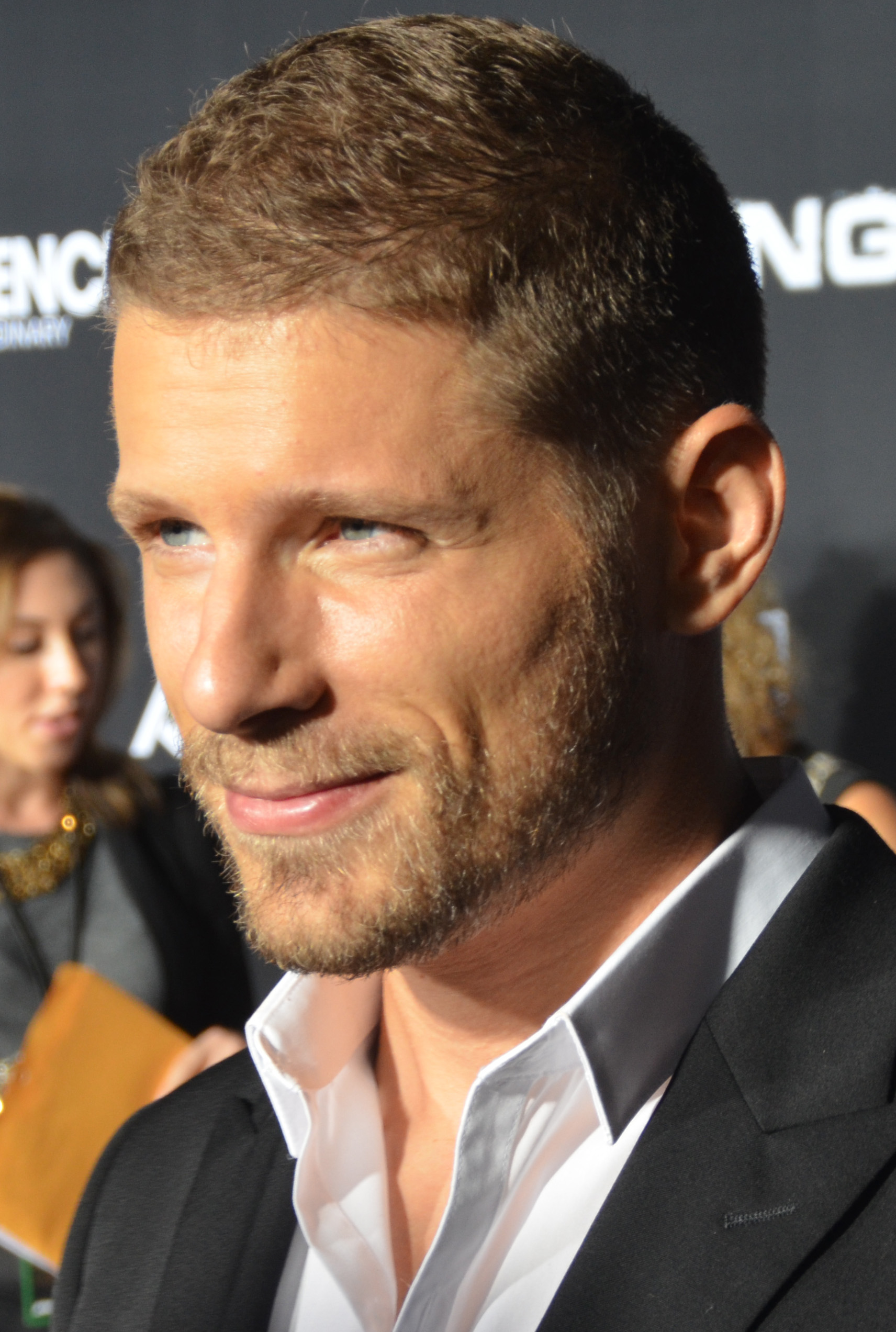
- Lauria in October 2014
- Born: Matthew Lauria; August 15, 1982 (age 44) (Note: TV Guide reports his birth year as 1984, but Lauria's own tweet from his verified account says he was born in 1982.)
- Education: University of North Carolina School of the Arts (BFA)
- Occupations: Actor; musician
- Years active: 2005–present
- Spouse: Michelle Armstrong (m. 2006)

Matthew Lauria (born August 15, 1982) is an American actor and musician. He made his television debut on the NBC sitcom 30 Rock in 2007. He is best known for his roles as Luke Cafferty on the NBC/DirecTV drama Friday Night Lights, Ryan York on the NBC family drama Parenthood, and Ryan Wheeler on the Audience drama Kingdom. In 2021, Lauria appeared as a series regular on the crime thriller television series CSI: Vegas.

== Early life and education ==
Lauria moved to Ireland with his family when he was seven. His father was an animator and an artist. He has two sisters. He spent his formative years growing up in Dublin and moved back to the U.S. to attend high school. He received his formal acting training from the University of North Carolina School of the Arts in their drama conservatory, where he earned a BFA in drama.

== Career ==
Within a few weeks of moving to New York City, Lauria successfully made his television debut as Winthrop on the NBC sitcom 30 Rock. Soon after, he landed a recurring role on the NBC romantic sitcom Lipstick Jungle as Roy Merritt, where he co-starred with Brooke Shields, Andrew McCarthy and Robert Buckley.

Lauria landed his first starring role as Luke Cafferty, #44 of the East Dillon Lions, in the Emmy award-winning NBC/DirecTV drama Friday Night Lights, for which he moved to Pflugerville, Texas in order to film. Lauria remained on the show until it ended in 2011. After finishing Friday Night Lights, Lauria moved to Chicago, Illinois after being cast as Caleb Evers in the Fox crime drama The Chicago Code. The show was cancelled after one season.

He co-starred as Charlie Carnegie on the ABC drama pilot Gilded Lilys created and produced by Shonda Rhimes. From 2012 to 2015, Lauria had a recurring role as Ryan York, a veteran of the Afghanistan war, on the fourth, fifth and sixth seasons of the NBC family drama Parenthood, reuniting with former Friday Night Lights showrunner Jason Katims. He also starred as Ryan Wheeler on the DirecTV drama series Kingdom which premiered on the Audience Network in the fall of 2014. In 2019, he appeared in two action thrillers, opposite Gina Rodriguez and Ismael Cruz Córdova in Miss Bala, directed by Catherine Hardwicke, and Shaft, directed by Tim Story.

In 2019 and 2020, he played the role of Jackson Pruitt on the TV series Tell Me A Story. In 2020, he also played the role of Bill on the TV series Little Birds.

Starting in 2021, he played the role of Josh Folsom on the hit show CSI: Vegas.

== Personal life ==
Lauria is an avid electric guitarist. On August 26, 2006, he married musician Michelle Armstrong.

== Filmography ==
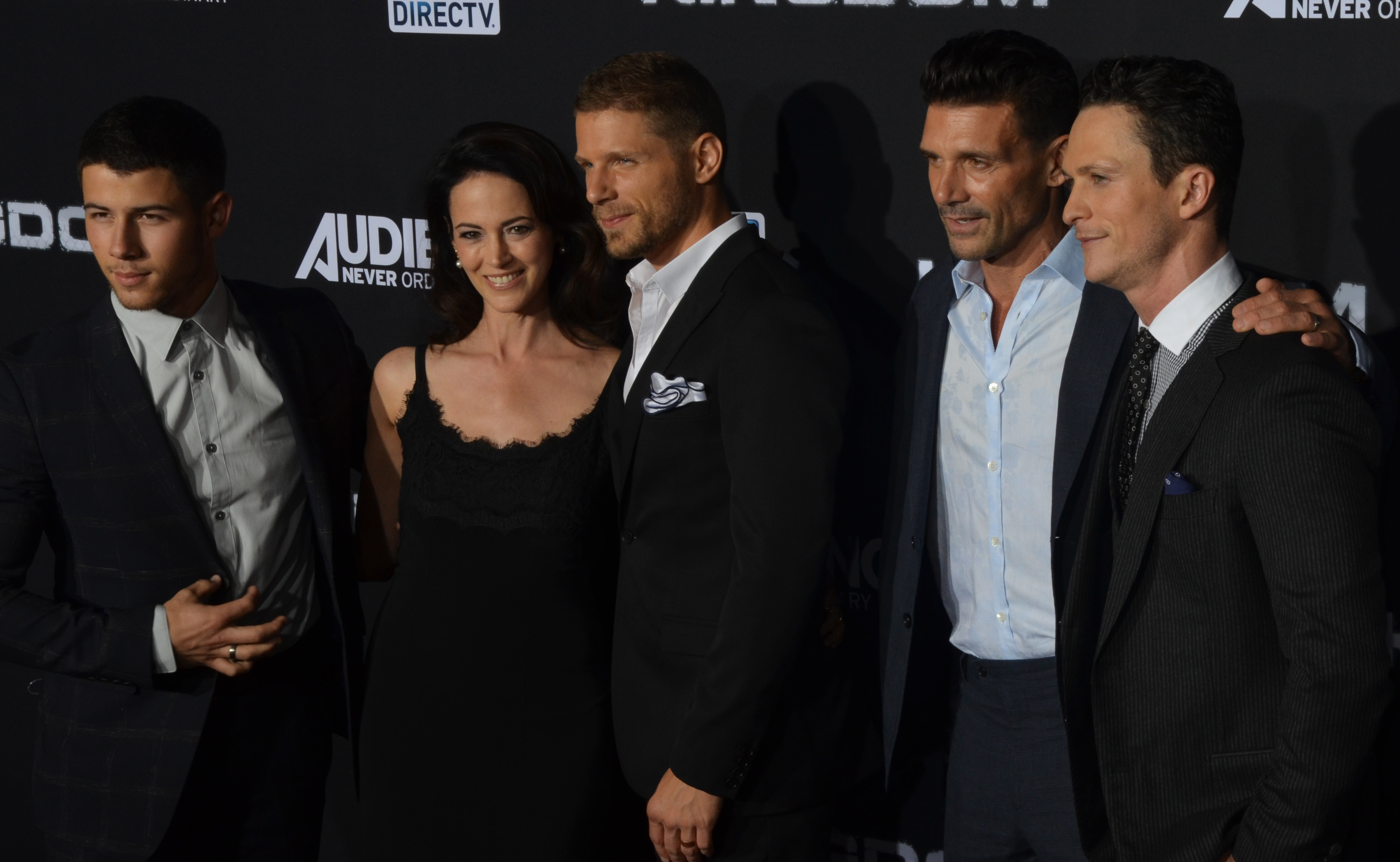
Nick Jonas, Joanna Going, Lauria, Frank Grillo and Jonathan Tucker at the premiere of Kingdom in October 2014

=== Film ===
| Year | Title | Role | Notes |
|---|---|---|---|
| 2005 | Raccoon | Sam Roxbury | Short film |
| 2009 | 8 Easy Steps | VeggieLite | Short film |
| 2015 | Ma | Cowboy | |
| 2019 | Miss Bala | Brian Reich | |
| 2019 | Shaft | Major Gary Cutworth | |
| 2022 | To Leslie | Handsome Outlaw | |
| 2023 | 80 for Brady | James | |
| 2025 | Due West | Cody | |

=== Television ===
| Year | Title | Role | Notes |
|---|---|---|---|
| 2007 | 30 Rock | Winthrop | Episode: "Jack Gets in the Game" |
| 2008 | Law & Order: Criminal Intent | Jake Lally | Episode: "Neighborhood Watch" |
| 2008–09 | Lipstick Jungle | Roy Merritt | Recurring role (seasons 1–2); 13 episodes |
| 2009 | The Forgotten | Eric / John Doe | Episode: "Living Doe" |
| 2009–11 | Friday Night Lights | Luke Cafferty | Main role (seasons 4–5); 26 episodes |
| 2011 | The Chicago Code | Caleb Evers | Main role |
| 2011 | Burn Notice | Ethan | Episode: "Square One" |
| 2011, 2012 | CSI: Crime Scene Investigation | FBI agent Matthew Pratt | 3 episodes |
| 2012 | Person of Interest | Adam Saunders | Episode: "Risk" |
| 2012–15 | Parenthood | Ryan York | Recurring role (seasons 4–6); 25 episodes |
| 2013 | Gilded Lilys | Charlie Carnegie | Television film |
| 2014 | It Could Be Worse | Nelson | Episode: "Uncharted Territory" |
| 2014–17 | Kingdom | Ryan Wheeler | Main role |
| 2017 | Dimension 404 | Evan | Episode: "Impulse" |
| 2019 | Traitors | Peter McCormick | Main role |
| 2019 | Into the Dark | Guy / John Deakins | Episode: "Down" |
| 2019 | Dickinson | Ben Newton | Recurring role |
| 2019–20 | Tell Me A Story | Jackson Pruitt | Main role |
| 2020 | Little Birds | Bill | Main role |
| 2021–24 | CSI: Vegas | Josh Folsom | Main role |
| 2022–24 | Outer Range | Trevor Tillerson | Recurring role |
| 2025 | Duster | David Callahan | Recurring role |
| 2025–present | Sheriff Country | Nathan Boone | Main role |
| 2026–present | Fire Country | Nathan Boone | Episode: "The Finest" |
