= List of Friday Night Lights episodes =

Friday Night Lights is an American sports drama television series developed by Peter Berg from a book and film of the same name. The series details events surrounding a high school football team from a fictional town called Dillon: a small, close-knit community in rural Texas. Particular focus is given to team coach Eric Taylor (Kyle Chandler) and his family. During the course of the series, 76 episodes of Friday Night Lights aired over five seasons.

== Series overview ==
Season	Episodes	Originally released		
Season	Episodes	First released	Last released	Network
1	22	October 3, 2006	April 11, 2007	NBC
2	15	October 5, 2007	February 8, 2008	NBC
3	13	October 1, 2008	January 14, 2009	DirecTV
4	13	October 28, 2009	February 10, 2010	DirecTV
5	13	October 27, 2010	February 9, 2011	DirecTV

== Episodes ==
=== Season 1 (2006–07) ===
No. overall	No. in season	Title	Directed by	Written by	Original release date	U.S. viewers (millions)
1	1	"Pilot"	Peter Berg	Peter Berg	October 3, 2006	7.17
2	2	"Eyes Wide Open"	Jeffrey Reiner	Jason Katims	October 10, 2006	5.87
3	3	"Wind Sprints"	Jeffrey Reiner	Elizabeth Heldens	October 17, 2006	6.55
4	4	"Who's Your Daddy"	Allison Liddi-Brown	Kerry Ehrin	October 24, 2006	6.27
5	5	"Git'er Done"	Mark Piznarski	Patrick Massett & John Zinman	October 30, 2006	8.26
6	6	"El Accidente"	Dan Lerner	Carter Harris	November 7, 2006	5.94
7	7	"Homecoming"	Patrick Norris	David Hudgins	November 14, 2006	5.48
8	8	"Crossing the Line"	Jeffrey Reiner	Bridget Carpenter	November 28, 2006	6.18
9	9	"Full Hearts"	Josh Pate	Aaron Rahsaan Thomas	December 5, 2006	6.13
10	10	"It's Different for Girls"	Stephen Kay	Andy Miller	December 12, 2006	5.66
11	11	"Nevermind"	Jonas Pate	Elizabeth Heldens	January 3, 2007	6.28
12	12	"What to Do While You're Waiting"	David Boyd	Kerry Ehrin	January 10, 2007	6.41
13	13	"Little Girl I Wanna Marry You"	Jeffrey Reiner	Jason Katims	January 24, 2007	5.66
14	14	"Upping the Ante"	Allison Liddi-Brown	David Hudgins	January 31, 2007	6.73
15	15	"Blinders"	Stephen Kay	Bridget Carpenter & Carter Harris	February 7, 2007	6.41
16	16	"Black Eyes and Broken Hearts"	Jeffrey Reiner	Patrick Massett & John Zinman	February 14, 2007	7.43
17	17	"I Think We Should Have Sex"	Allison Liddi-Brown	Elizabeth Heldens	February 21, 2007	5.16
18	18	"Extended Families"	Charles Stone	Kerry Ehrin	February 28, 2007	5.07
19	19	"Ch-Ch-Ch-Ch-Changes"	Jeffrey Reiner	Jason Katims	March 21, 2007	5.39
20	20	"Mud Bowl"	David Boyd	Elizabeth Heldens & David Hudgins	March 28, 2007	5.68
21	21	"Best Laid Plans"	Jeffrey Reiner	Kerry Ehrin & Carter Harris	April 4, 2007	5.33
22	22	"State"	Jeffrey Reiner	Jason Katims & Patrick Massett & John Zinman	April 11, 2007	6.26

=== Season 2 (2007–08) ===
No. overall	No. in season	Title	Directed by	Written by	Original release date	U.S. viewers (millions)
23	1	"Last Days of Summer"	Jeffrey Reiner	Jason Katims	October 5, 2007	6.37
24	2	"Bad Ideas"	Jeffrey Reiner	Elizabeth Heldens	October 12, 2007	5.46
25	3	"Are You Ready for Friday Night?"	Seith Mann	Kerry Ehrin	October 19, 2007	5.37
26	4	"Backfire"	Jonas Pate	David Hudgins	October 26, 2007	5.81
27	5	"Let's Get It On"	David Boyd	Patrick Massett & John Zinman	November 2, 2007	5.40
28	6	"How Did I Get Here"	Jonas Pate	Carter Harris	November 9, 2007	5.56
29	7	"Pantherama!"	David Boyd	Bridget Carpenter	November 16, 2007	5.96
30	8	"Seeing Other People"	Jeffrey Reiner	Elizabeth Heldens	November 30, 2007	5.47
31	9	"The Confession"	Allison Liddi-Brown	Bridget Carpenter	December 7, 2007	5.14
32	10	"There Goes the Neighborhood"	Jeffrey Reiner	David Hudgins	January 4, 2008	5.53
33	11	"Jumping the Gun"	Dan Attias	Patrick Massett & John Zinman	January 11, 2008	5.80
34	12	"Who Do You Think You Are?"	Michael Waxman	Kerry Ehrin	January 18, 2008	5.33
35	13	"Humble Pie"	Jeffrey Reiner	Carter Harris	January 25, 2008	5.37
36	14	"Leave No One Behind"	Dean White	Aaron Rahsaan Thomas	February 1, 2008	5.64
37	15	"May the Best Man Win"	Patrick Norris	David Hudgins	February 8, 2008	5.22

=== Season 3 (2008–09) ===
No. overall	No. in season	Title	Directed by	Written by	Original release date	U.S. viewers (millions)
38	1	"I Knew You When"	Jeffrey Reiner	Jason Katims	October 1, 2008 (DirectTV); January 16, 2009 (NBC)	4.54
39	2	"Tami Knows Best"	Jeffrey Reiner	Elizabeth Heldens	October 8, 2008 (DirectTV); January 23, 2009 (NBC)	3.96
40	3	"How the Other Half Lives"	Dean White	Patrick Massett & John Zinman	October 15, 2008 (DirectTV); January 30, 2009 (NBC)	4.00
41	4	"Hello, Goodbye"	Michael Waxman	David Hudgins	October 22, 2008 (DirectTV); February 6, 2009 (NBC)	4.21
42	5	"Every Rose Has Its Thorn"	Jason Katims	Kerry Ehrin	October 29, 2008 (DirectTV); February 13, 2009 (NBC)	3.50
43	6	"It Ain't Easy Being J.D. McCoy"	Patrick Norris	Bridget Carpenter	November 5, 2008 (DirectTV); February 20, 2009 (NBC)	3.93
44	7	"Keeping Up Appearances"	Chris Eyre	Brent Fletcher	November 12, 2008 (DirectTV); February 27, 2009 (NBC)	4.22
45	8	"New York, New York"	Jeffrey Reiner	Kerry Ehrin	November 19, 2008 (DirectTV); March 6, 2009 (NBC)	3.80
46	9	"Game of the Week"	Michael Waxman	David Hudgins	December 3, 2008 (DirectTV); March 13, 2009 (NBC)	4.40
47	10	"The Giving Tree"	David Boyd	Elizabeth Heldens	December 10, 2008 (DirectTV); March 20, 2009 (NBC)	3.84
48	11	"A Hard Rain's Gonna Fall"	Michael Waxman	Bridget Carpenter & Patrick Massett & John Zinman	December 17, 2008 (DirectTV); March 27, 2009 (NBC)	3.95
49	12	"Underdogs"	Jeffrey Reiner	Elizabeth Heldens	January 7, 2009 (DirectTV); April 3, 2009 (NBC)	3.61
50	13	"Tomorrow Blues"	Jeffrey Reiner	Jason Katims	January 14, 2009 (DirectTV); April 10, 2009 (NBC)	4.36

=== Season 4 (2009–10) ===
No. overall	No. in season	Title	Directed by	Written by	Original release date	U.S. viewers (millions)
51	1	"East of Dillon"	Peter Berg	Jason Katims	October 28, 2009 (DirectTV); May 7, 2010 (NBC)	3.90
52	2	"After the Fall"	Michael Waxman	Kerry Ehrin	November 4, 2009 (DirectTV); May 14, 2010 (NBC)	3.97
53	3	"In the Skin of a Lion"	Patrick Norris	Patrick Massett & John Zinman	November 11, 2009 (DirectTV); May 21, 2010 (NBC)	3.96
54	4	"A Sort of Homecoming"	Christopher Misiano	Etan Frankel	November 18, 2009 (DirectTV); May 28, 2010 (NBC)	3.53
55	5	"The Son"	Allison Liddi-Brown	Rolin Jones	December 2, 2009 (DirectTV); June 4, 2010 (NBC)	3.83
56	6	"Stay"	Patrick Norris	Bridget Carpenter	December 9, 2009 (DirectTV); June 11, 2010 (NBC)	3.66
57	7	"In the Bag"	Stephen Kay	Ron Fitzgerald	December 16, 2009 (DirectTV); June 18, 2010 (NBC)	3.43
58	8	"Toilet Bowl"	Michael Waxman	Derek Santos Olson	January 6, 2010 (DirectTV); June 25, 2010 (NBC)	3.54
59	9	"The Lights in Carroll Park"	Christopher Misiano	Patrick Massett & John Zinman	January 13, 2010 (DirectTV); July 2, 2010 (NBC)	3.46
60	10	"I Can't"	Ami Canaan Mann	Bridget Carpenter	January 20, 2010 (DirectTV); July 9, 2010 (NBC)	3.65
61	11	"Injury List"	Seith Mann	Kerry Ehrin	January 27, 2010 (DirectTV); July 23, 2010 (NBC)	3.49
62	12	"Laboring"	Adam Davidson	Rolin Jones	February 3, 2010 (DirectTV); July 30, 2010 (NBC)	3.12
63	13	"Thanksgiving"	Michael Waxman	Jason Katims	February 10, 2010 (DirectTV); August 6, 2010 (NBC)	3.56

=== Season 5 (2010–11) ===
No. overall	No. in season	Title	Directed by	Written by	Original release date	U.S. viewers (millions)
64	1	"Expectations"	Michael Waxman	David Hudgins	October 27, 2010 (DirectTV); April 15, 2011 (NBC)	3.57
65	2	"On the Outside Looking In"	Michael Waxman	Kerry Ehrin	November 3, 2010 (DirectTV); April 22, 2011 (NBC)	3.38
66	3	"The Right Hand of the Father"	David Boyd	Patrick Massett & John Zinman	November 10, 2010 (DirectTV); April 29, 2011 (NBC)	2.99
67	4	"Keep Looking"	Todd McMullen	Bridget Carpenter	November 17, 2010 (DirectTV); May 6, 2011 (NBC)	2.82
68	5	"Kingdom"	Patrick Norris	Rolin Jones	December 1, 2010 (DirectTV); May 13, 2011 (NBC)	2.88
69	6	"Swerve"	Jonas Pate	Ron Fitzgerald	December 8, 2010 (DirectTV); May 20, 2011 (NBC)	3.34
70	7	"Perfect Record"	Adam Davidson	Etan Frankel & Derek Santos Olson	December 15, 2010 (DirectTV); May 27, 2011 (NBC)	2.92
71	8	"Fracture"	Allison Liddi-Brown	Monica Henderson	January 5, 2011 (DirectTV); June 3, 2011 (NBC)	2.91
72	9	"Gut Check"	Chris Eyre	David Hudgins	January 12, 2011 (DirectTV); June 17, 2011 (NBC)	3.07
73	10	"Don't Go"	Michael Waxman	Bridget Carpenter	January 19, 2011 (DirectTV); June 24, 2011 (NBC)	2.82
74	11	"The March"	Jason Katims	Rolin Jones	January 26, 2011 (DirectTV); July 1, 2011 (NBC)	2.45
75	12	"Texas Whatever"	Kyle Chandler	Kerry Ehrin	February 2, 2011 (DirectTV); July 8, 2011 (NBC)	3.01
76	13	"Always"	Michael Waxman	Jason Katims	February 9, 2011 (DirectTV); July 15, 2011 (NBC)	3.18
