= Tomorrow Blues =

- Friday Night Lights episode
- Episode no.: Season 3 Episode 13
- Directed by: Jeffrey Reiner
- Written by: Jason Katims
- Cinematography by: Todd McMullen
- Editing by: Ron Rosen
- Original release dates: January 14, 2009 (DirecTV); April 10, 2009 (NBC)
- Running time: 45 minutes

Guest appearances
- Kim Dickens as Shelby Saracen; Jeremy Sumpter as J.D. McCoy; D. W. Moffett as Joe McCoy; Brad Leland as Buddy Garrity; Dana Wheeler-Nicholson as Angela Collette

Episode chronology
← Previous "Underdogs"	Next → "East of Dillon"
- Friday Night Lights (season 3)

"Tomorrow Blues" is the thirteenth episode and season finale of the third season of the American sports drama television series Friday Night Lights, inspired by the 1990 nonfiction book by H. G. Bissinger. It is the 50th overall episode of the series and was written by executive producer Jason Katims, and directed by executive producer Jeffrey Reiner. It originally aired on DirecTV's 101 Network on January 14, 2009, before airing on NBC on April 10, 2009.

The series is set in the fictional town of Dillon, a small, close-knit community in rural West Texas. It follows a high school football team, the Dillon Panthers. It features a set of characters, primarily connected to Coach Eric Taylor, his wife Tami, and their daughter Julie. In the episode, Eric's job is under review as his contract awaits renewal. Meanwhile, Matt, Tim and Lyla prepare for their college future, while Tyra worries about not making it to college.

According to Nielsen Media Research, the episode was seen by an estimated 4.36 million household viewers and gained a 1.3/4 ratings share among adults aged 18–49. The episode received critical acclaim, with critics praising the performances, smaller scale, character development and emotional tone.

== Plot ==
Five months after the state championship, Dillon has moved on after the loss. As the school year is over, Tami (Connie Britton) announces Matt (Zach Gilford) will be going to the School of the Art Institute of Chicago, while both Tim (Taylor Kitsch) and Lyla (Minka Kelly) will attend San Antonio State University. Tyra (Adrianne Palicki) is still in the process of applying for college, and J.D. (Jeremy Sumpter) was named by Dave Campbell's Texas Football as "High School Quarterback of the Year". He also joins the Dillon Panthers baseball team as a shortstop.

Eric (Kyle Chandler) has his contract expiring in a few days, requiring the committee to review a possible extension. As he and Buddy (Brad Leland) meet with a family to convince them in joining Dillon High, they are astounded when they realize that Joe (D. W. Moffett) and Wade (Drew Waters) already contacted the family on behalf of the team. Eric confronts Joe for his actions, who offers him a chance in vouching for him to keep his position if he uses Wade's plays, which he refuses. Buddy is not convinced of Lyla's college choice, as he deems the college as a "party school", especially with Tim's presence. Tami contacts Vanderbilt University, getting an extension of possible enrollment for Lyla. To pay for college, Buddy accepts to meet with his estranged brother Gary.

Matt takes Lorraine (Louanne Stephens) to an elderly care home, and he shares a goodbye as he prepares for leaving for college. Tim and Billy (Derek Phillips) go to an auction to buy items for the repair shop, and Tim convinces Billy in buying a Texas Longhorn. However, the car breaks down and they have an argument over Billy's financial status. As Tim consoles him, he is overjoyed when Billy reveals that Mindy is pregnant. Landry (Jesse Plemons) consoles Tyra over her impending future, telling her she only needs to focus on herself to find happiness. That night, a UT letter arrives and Tyra is delighted to learn that she has been accepted. Eric attends the board meeting, saying that his days as coach are just getting started. During the wedding of Billy and Mindy, Tami tells Eric that the committee has chosen Wade as the new coach, but that they are offering Eric the position of head coach in East Dillon High.

At the reception, Lyla tells Tim that she contacted Gary for the needed money but she questions leaving Tim. Tim assures her that she should go to Vanderbilt, feeling she deserves a better school. Julie (Aimee Teegarden) tells Matt that they will have to break up, knowing that a long-distance relationship won't work. Matt decides to take Lorraine out of the care home and get her to the wedding, as she is the only person who didn't abandon him. Tim tells Billy he won't go to college, so an upset Billy tells him that he needs to do it; as he is the first Riggins family member to go to college, he will inspire their children, convincing him to go. Eric takes Tami to the East Dillon field house, embracing as they stare at Eric's new job.

== Production ==
=== Development ===
The episode was written by executive producer Jason Katims, and directed by executive producer Jeffrey Reiner. This was Katims' seventh writing credit, and Reiner's 18th directing credit.

== Reception ==
=== Viewers ===
In its original American broadcast on NBC, "Tomorrow Blues" was seen by an estimated 4.36 million household viewers with a 1.3/4 in the 18–49 demographics. This means that 1.3 percent of all households with televisions watched the episode, while 4 percent of all of those watching television at the time of the broadcast watched it. This was a 20% increase in viewership from the previous episode, which was watched by an estimated 3.61 million household viewers with a 1.2/4 in the 18–49 demographics.

=== Critical reviews ===
"Tomorrow Blues" received critical acclaim. Eric Goldman of IGN gave the episode a "great" 8.8 out of 10 and wrote, "this is for the most part a lovely send off for this season, and for some, if not all of these characters. The way one of the central conflicts of the episode is resolved (it's the conflict the final scene shows the outcome of) is very clever – I didn't see it coming, but in retrospect, it makes perfect sense, and definitely will be interesting to follow in Season 4."

Keith Phipps of The A.V. Club gave the episode an "A–" grade and wrote, "So whatever faults this episode might have had a series finale, they don't matter as much as a season finale. And as I revisited these episodes and the posts from last fall, I realized I underrated what turned out to be a very fine stretch of episodes, maybe in part because I was looking at it as the show's last gasp. I was wrong about that and wrong in some of my conclusions." Ken Tucker of Entertainment Weekly wrote, "What a humdinger of a finale we got for a superlative season of Friday Night Lights. Could things have been more tense, emotional, or funny?"

Alan Sepinwall wrote, "If the show somehow continues, I'm excited for the possibilities created by the East Dillon move. And if it ends, we'll always have those moments where Friday Night Lights reached deep into our guts, or brushed across our spines, and moved us in a way that few of us would have expected from a show about Texas high school football." Erin Fox of TV Guide wrote, "Last episode, we saw the Panthers lose their coveted state title by one point in a valiantly played game. Now, we've fast-forwarded to the end of the school year and we meet up with Tami and the gang at the Senior Brunch."

Jonathan Pacheco of Slant Magazine wrote, "For this finale, Friday Night Lights uses the celebration as a catalyst for decisions and adds that small town touch that we've come to love from the show. It's not as much of an all-time great like last week's 'Underdogs', but the Season 3 finale stands strongly as a capper to the season." Television Without Pity gave the episode an "A" grade.

Jason Katims submitted this episode for consideration for Outstanding Writing for a Drama Series, while Jeffrey Reiner submitted it for Outstanding Directing for a Drama Series at the 61st Primetime Emmy Awards.
