= New York, New York (Friday Night Lights) =

- Friday Night Lights episode
- Episode no.: Season 3 Episode 8
- Directed by: Jeffrey Reiner
- Written by: Kerry Ehrin
- Cinematography by: Todd McMullen
- Editing by: Peter B. Ellis
- Original release dates: November 19, 2008 (DirecTV); March 6, 2009 (NBC)
- Running time: 43 minutes

Guest appearances
- Scott Porter as Jason Street; Jeremy Sumpter as J.D. McCoy; D. W. Moffett as Joe McCoy; Janine Turner as Katie McCoy; Kevin Rankin as Herc; Brad Leland as Buddy Garrity; Zach Roerig as Cash Waller; Dana Wheeler-Nicholson as Angela Collette

Episode chronology
← Previous "Keeping Up Appearances"	Next → "Game of the Week"
- Friday Night Lights (season 3)

"New York, New York" is the eighth episode of the third season of the American sports drama television series Friday Night Lights, inspired by the 1990 nonfiction book by H. G. Bissinger. It is the 45th overall episode of the series and was written by consulting producer Kerry Ehrin, and directed by executive producer Jeffrey Reiner. It originally aired on DirecTV's 101 Network on November 19, 2008, before airing on NBC on March 6, 2009.

The series is set in the fictional town of Dillon, a small, close-knit community in rural West Texas. It follows a high school football team, the Dillon Panthers. It features a set of characters, primarily connected to Coach Eric Taylor, his wife Tami, and their daughter Julie. In the episode, Jason goes to New York to find a new job with Tim's help. Meanwhile, Matt decides to change his position, while Tyra questions her future with Cash.

According to Nielsen Media Research, the episode was seen by an estimated 3.80 million household viewers and gained a 1.2/4 ratings share among adults aged 18–49. The episode received positive reviews from critics, who praised the closure to Jason Street's story arc, although some questioned the episode's logic.

== Plot ==
Jason (Scott Porter) tells Tim (Taylor Kitsch), Herc (Kevin Rankin), and Billy (Derek Phillips) that he will leave Dillon and move to New York City to accept the sports agency job, in order to get closer to Erin (Tamara Jolaine) and Noah. Tim is surprised by his decision, but decides to accompany him to New York.

During training, Mac (Blue Deckert) has a heart attack and is placed at the hospital, forcing the team to find a new replacement. During this, Matt (Zach Gilford) approaches Eric (Kyle Chandler) over possibly becoming a wide receiver. Eric declines his request, as he would be left without a quarterback if Matt and J.D. (Jeremy Sumpter) get injured. Eric is also annoyed when he learns that Tami (Connie Britton) has checked a house with Katie (Janine Turner) to possibly move the Taylors. They check the house, where they get into an argument as Eric believes they cannot afford the house.

In New York City, Tim and Jason buy a suit for the latter before his interview with the agency. Jason meets with the agent, Grant (Scottie Jefferies), at his office. However, Grant tells him that Jason is unlikely to make it in the sports agency, as the applicants come from Harvard. Grant also reveals that Jason's friend ditched him for a better company in the city. Tim suggests that Jason should convince the friend to go back to Grant. Jason visits him, attempting to convince him in going back with Grant. Jason admits he wants Grant to give him a job, but he is also worried that he is making a mistake by abandoning the agency. He agrees to return with Grant, who in turn invites Jason to their meeting, signing him.

Cash (Zach Roerig) tells Tyra (Adrianne Palicki) that he will be leaving for a few months due to a new rodeo, and invites her to accompany him, which she declines due to her school commitments. As she applies for many college interviews, she calls Cash, asking if he will remain committed to her. Cash hesitates, which distracts Tyra during her interviews. After heavy consideration, she decides to join Cash in his trip, despite the impact it may have on her academic career. Matt convinces Eric to play football outside his house, planning to show that he has potential as a wide receiver. Matt catches most of the passes, noting that Eric poorly passed the final one.

Eric and Tami once again check the house. Despite his impression, Eric does not change his mind due to the price. Tami says she understands, and that they do not need the house. At training, Eric decides to put Matt as a wide receiver. Jason and Tim go to Hackensack, New Jersey, where they bid each other farewell. Jason shows up at Erin's house, where he holds Noah in his arms and asks to be part of their lives. They share a kiss as Tim holds back tears from afar.

== Production ==
=== Development ===
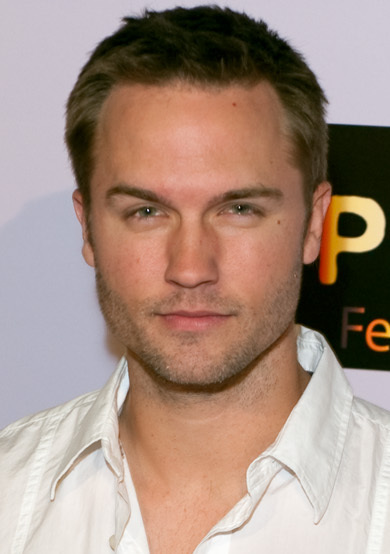
The episode marked Scott Porter's last appearance as a series regular.

In November 2008, DirecTV announced that the eighth episode of the season would be titled "New York, New York". The episode was written by consulting producer Kerry Ehrin, and directed by executive producer Jeffrey Reiner. This was Ehrin's eighth writing credit, and Reiner's 16th directing credit.

=== Casting ===
In July 2008, it was announced that Scott Porter would leave the series after appearing in four episodes, with Jason Katims explaining that the decision was done to "launch [himself] into the next phase of [his life]." Porter said that "it was like a punch in the gut when I found out I was going to be leaving. [...] But at the end of the day, as actors you appreciate it for two reasons. First, they did such a great job with our exits. Also, I appreciate what the show has done for me as an actor. The day I finished filming my last episode, I got on a plane and started shooting my next film."

=== Filming ===
The crew only had two days to film all the scenes in New York City, with the series not getting most of the permits needed to film the scenes. Jeffrey Reiner wanted to film a scene on a subway car, which was achieved without asking for permission to film. Jason's final scene required only two takes, although Reiner told Porter that only the first take would be used in the final cut. Porter described the feeling as "I couldn't keep it together. I couldn't not cry, and Taylor couldn't not cry."

Porter said that he asked Jason Katims to arrange a scene where Jason took his trophies from Eric's office, only to be told by Eric that he would keep them until Jason returned for them. Katims liked the idea, and the scene was shot, but it was removed from the final cut due to runtime concerns.

== Reception ==
=== Viewers ===
In its original American broadcast on NBC, "New York, New York" was seen by an estimated 3.80 million household viewers with a 1.2/4 in the 18–49 demographics. This means that 1.2 percent of all households with televisions watched the episode, while 4 percent of all of those watching television at the time of the broadcast watched it. This was a 10% decrease in viewership from the previous episode, which was watched by an estimated 4.22 million household viewers with a 1.5/5 in the 18–49 demographics.

=== Critical reviews ===
"New York, New York" received positive reviews from critics. Eric Goldman of IGN gave the episode a "great" 8.9 out of 10 and wrote, "It was a great moment because it was clear Riggins was happy for his friend and also sad to be losing him. I'm right there with ya Riggins. Jason Street will be missed."

Keith Phipps of The A.V. Club gave the episode a "B" grade and wrote, "Okay, let's just say this clearly: Street's storyline here is pretty implausible. Almost too-implausible-to-enjoy implausible. It's a convenient happy ending exit for Street arrived at by plot turns that seem only half thought-out by the show's grounded standards."

Alan Sepinwall wrote, ""New York, New York" represented the best and worst of Friday Night Lights, in that it was all heart and no brains. It had moments that were very sweet or touching or just plain funny, and yet looking back on it, most of what happens doesn't make a lick of sense." Todd Martens of Los Angeles Times wrote, "Friday Night Lights veered too close to soap opera territory, letting Street win his way out of multiple outlandish situations in two episodes, but his final, heart-wrenching speech was likely enough pay-off for most fans."

Erin Fox of TV Guide wrote, "'New York, New York' is one of the best and most emotional episodes of Friday Night Lights ever." Jonathan Pacheco of Slant Magazine wrote, "'New York, New York' is Jason's right of passage. He's proven himself worthy, now he must voyage across the land and complete his trials. If he fights hard enough, he'll earn the life he craves so badly."

Daniel Fienberg of Zap2it wrote, "While the episode and circumstances around the departure of Scott Porter's Jason Street weren't quite as strong as the set-up for Gaius Charles' exit in "Hello, Goodbye," I'm guessing the hour hit many of the right emotional high points for long-time viewers." Television Without Pity gave the episode a "B+" grade.

Kerry Ehrin submitted this episode for consideration for Outstanding Writing for a Drama Series at the 61st Primetime Emmy Awards.
