= Friday Night Lights season 3 =

Friday Night Lights
- Season 3
- Season 3 DVD cover
- No. of episodes: 13

Release
- Original network: The 101 Network (first run); NBC (network)
- Original release: October 1, 2008 – January 14, 2009

Season chronology
- ← Previous; Season 2 Next → Season 4

The third season of the American serial drama television series Friday Night Lights began airing in the United States and Canada on October 1, 2008. It was the first season to be aired on DirecTV's The 101 Network. The 13-episode season concluded on The 101 Network on January 14, 2009, and then began its run on NBC two nights later, on January 16, 2009, and concluded its NBC run on April 10, 2009. The show was renewed for two more seasons in March 2009, with both seasons airing in the same format as season 3, containing 13 episodes each. The third season was released on DVD in region 1 on May 19, 2009.

The season continues to focus around the Dillon Panthers and the pressures faced on and off the field. This season also has four main characters leave the show by season's end.

== Cast ==
Unlike the previous two seasons, only eight of ten major roles received star billing in the opening credits: Kyle Chandler portrayed Eric Taylor, head coach of the Dillon Panthers. Connie Britton played Tami Taylor, wife of Eric and new principal of Dillon High School; Zach Gilford played quarterback Matt Saracen. Minka Kelly played Lyla Garrity, now girlfriend of Tim Riggins, fullback and resident bad boy, portrayed by Taylor Kitsch. Adrianne Palicki played Tyra Collette. Jesse Plemons played Landry Clarke, Tyra's not-quite boyfriend and Saracen's best friend. Aimee Teegarden played Julie Taylor, Eric and Tami's daughter.

Supporting characters include: Brad Leland as Buddy Garrity, Lyla's father and head of the Dillon Panthers Booster Club; Derek Phillips as Billy Riggins, Tim's brother; Louanne Stephens as Lorraine Saracen, Matt Saracen's grandmother; Liz Mikel as Corrina Williams, Smash's mother; Dana Wheeler-Nicholson as Angela Collette, Tyra's mother; Stacey Oristano as Mindy Collette, Tyra's sister and Billy Riggins' fiancée; and Kevin Rankin as Herc.

Gaius Charles and Scott Porter were billed as guest stars during their four-episode run as Brian "Smash" Williams, who left for college, and Jason Street, who left to become a sports agent in New York, so he could be near his baby, Noah, and Noah's mother.

The new characters first introduced this season include: The McCoy Family (D.W. Moffett as father Joe, Janine Turner as mother Katie, and Jeremy Sumpter as son J.D., a quarterback for the Panthers) and Shelby Garrett (Kim Dickens), Matt Saracen's estranged mother.

== Season synopsis ==
The season begins with Coach Taylor's having failed to lead the Panthers to another State championship the year before, creating new pressure for him. Quarterback Matt Saracen's position is threatened by the arrival of freshman J.D. McCoy, an amazing natural talent who comes from a rich family with an overbearing father, Joe. Matt eventually moves to wide receiver after Taylor names J.D. McCoy the starting quarterback, but Matt is pushed back into his former role in the playoffs. Matt and Julie Taylor reconcile, and rekindle their romance.

Smash Williams, who had injured his knee during the previous year's playoffs, rediscovers his love for the game, gets a tryout with a college, and succeeds in winning a spot on their team.

Tyra Collette starts dating a cowboy named Cash, leading to complications in her relationship with Landry and her academics. Tim Riggins and Lyla Garrity start dating, and Tim pursues a college football scholarship. Billy Riggins gets engaged to Tyra's older sister Mindy Collette. He, Tim, Herc, and Jason Street decide to flip Buddy Garrity's house for a profit. Jason eventually finds a job at a sports agency in New York City and moves to the northeast, to be close to his girlfriend and newborn baby. Tami Taylor becomes the principal of cash-strapped Dillon High School and fights with Buddy Garrity about the allocation of funds toward a Jumbotron.

While Eric Taylor and Buddy Garrity are visiting a possible recruit who just moved into town, the coach learns of a plot to have him replaced as head coach of the Dillon Panthers; Joe McCoy wants Taylor replaced with Wade Aikmen, J.D.'s personal coach. After the school board meets to decide who gets the coaching job, Aikmen is offered the job at Dillon High School, while Taylor is offered the job of coaching the Lions of East Dillon High, which is reopening after years of being closed.

== Continuity ==
With the 2007–2008 Writers Guild of America strike cutting the second season in half, there is a longer story gap between the end of season 2 and the beginning of season 3 than occurred between the other seasons of Friday Night Lights. Some plots are quickly summarized, while others are never again mentioned in season 3. One example of the latter is Santiago, the street kid Buddy Garrity took in, who in season 3 is evidently no longer living there and is not seen or mentioned again. Another is Lyla's relationship with Chris and her devout Christianity. Lyla is now living with her father and in a relationship with Tim Riggins. Landry and Tyra have dated and are now broken up. Smash Williams was seriously injured in a playoff game the preceding season and, consequently, has lost his college football scholarship; he is now a manager at the Alamo Freeze fast food restaurant. Playing without him, the Dillon football team fell apart and failed to win the state championship. Jason Street was last seen in season 2 trying to convince Erin, a waitress with whom he had had a one-night stand, not to get an abortion; in season 3 we see that Erin has had the child, but the couple is not living together. Tami Taylor is now the Dillon High School principal.

== Fictional game results ==
Fictional game results
Opponent	Result	Score	Record	Episode No.	Episode
Regular season^{[a]}
South Pines Tigers	Win	44–13	1–0	1	"I Knew You When"
Laribee Lions	Win	49–6	2–0	2	"Tami Knows Best"
Arnett Mead Tigers	Loss	17–21	2–1	3	"How the Other Half Lives"
McNulty Mavericks	Win	42–39	3–1	5	"Every Rose Has Its Thorn"
Westerby Chaps	Win	31–17	4–1	6	"It Ain't Easy Being J.D. McCoy"
Fort Hood Cougars	Win	15–14	5–1	7	"Keeping Up Appearances"
Regional playoffs^{[b]}
Arnett Mead Tigers	Win	10–7	6–1	9	"Game of the Week"
State quarter-finals
Buckley Bisons	Win	16–13	7–1	10	"The Giving Tree"
State semi-finals
West Cambria Mustangs	Win	15–14	8–1	11	"A Hard Rain's Gonna Fall"
State championship
South Texas Titans	Loss	28–30	8–2	12	"Underdogs"

^{a} While Friday Night Lights is presented as a serialized show with seemingly no gaps between episodes, public high schools in Texas typically play a ten game regular season.
^{b} While the playoff bracket only consisted of one regional playoff game, two games are played before moving on to the quarter-finals (as seen during the first season).

== Episodes ==
No. overall	No. in season	Title	Directed by	Written by	Original release date	U.S. viewers (millions)
38	1	"I Knew You When"	Jeffrey Reiner	Jason Katims	October 1, 2008 (DirectTV); January 16, 2009 (NBC)	4.54
In the third-season opener, Eric fights to keep his job and helps Smash rebound. Elsewhere, Tami faces new challenges as principal, Tyra frets over college, Billy proposes, and tension escalates between Lyla and Riggins.
39	2	"Tami Knows Best"	Jeffrey Reiner	Elizabeth Heldens	October 8, 2008 (DirectTV); January 23, 2009 (NBC)	3.96
Coach supports Smash's struggle to get a college tryout. Tyra's tactics disappoint Tami. Matt considers emancipation in an effort to protect his grandma, and in the process meets with his estranged mother (Kim Dickens). Tensions escalate with Lyla.
40	3	"How the Other Half Lives"	Dean White	Patrick Massett & John Zinman	October 15, 2008 (DirectTV); January 30, 2009 (NBC)	4.00
Eric frets over his job security, Tami befriends newcomer Katie McCoy (Janine Turner), Matt reconnects with Julie, and Lyla worries about Riggins, who's being roped into a moneymaking scheme by Billy.
41	4	"Hello, Goodbye"	Michael Waxman	David Hudgins	October 22, 2008 (DirectTV); February 6, 2009 (NBC)	4.21
Smash is given the scholarship by Texas A&M and bids farewell. Julie supports Matt during his struggles with his mom and grandmother. Tami embarrasses herself with the superintendent. Tyra dates a new guy (Zach Roerig).
42	5	"Every Rose Has Its Thorn"	Jason Katims	Kerry Ehrin	October 29, 2008 (DirectTV); February 13, 2009 (NBC)	3.50
Matt grapples with his mother, his emotions, and Coach Taylor as J.D. garners more attention. Elsewhere, Tyra sees a new side of Cash, and Jason is disappointed by Erin's decision.
43	6	"It Ain't Easy Being J.D. McCoy"	Patrick Norris	Bridget Carpenter	November 5, 2008 (DirectTV); February 20, 2009 (NBC)	3.93
Coach is furious with Tim and the team for a freshman hazing. J.D. wins the respect of the town and team. A late night swim at the lake turns into more for Julie and Matt. Tyra is shocked when a woman shows up claiming Cash owes her child support.
44	7	"Keeping Up Appearances"	Chris Eyre	Brent Fletcher	November 12, 2008 (DirectTV); February 27, 2009 (NBC)	4.22
Eric and Tami try to calm Jamarcus' angry parents; Billy helps Tim pursue a scholarship; and Jason, Herc, and the Riggins brothers receive good news.
45	8	"New York, New York"	Jeffrey Reiner	Kerry Ehrin	November 19, 2008 (DirectTV); March 6, 2009 (NBC)	3.80
Jason's plan to leave Dillon worries Tim, Tami and Eric butt heads over financial matters, Julie champions Matt's idea to her dad, and Tyra turns to Cash during a difficult time.
46	9	"Game of the Week"	Michael Waxman	David Hudgins	December 3, 2008 (DirectTV); March 13, 2009 (NBC)	4.40
Surprises await Tim when he returns to Dillon, Tami helps Tyra deal with a problem, Matt clashes with his mom, and Lyla and Mindy work together.
47	10	"The Giving Tree"	David Boyd	Elizabeth Heldens	December 10, 2008 (DirectTV); March 20, 2009 (NBC)	3.84
Coach is emotionally challenged both on and off the field, Lyla turns to Riggins when Buddy reveals a secret, Tyra has a plan to repair her relationship with Landry, and J.D. has no interest in his father's advice.
48	11	"A Hard Rain's Gonna Fall"	Michael Waxman	Bridget Carpenter & Patrick Massett & John Zinman	December 17, 2008 (DirectTV); March 27, 2009 (NBC)	3.95
Coach and Tami learn of a change that could dismantle the Panthers team, Matt flips out when Grandma suffers an accident, Tim sees another side of Lyla, Tyra is desperate and once again turns to Landry, and tensions escalate between J.D. and his father.
49	12	"Underdogs"	Jeffrey Reiner	Elizabeth Heldens	January 7, 2009 (DirectTV); April 3, 2009 (NBC)	3.61
As the team prepares for the state championship game against the undefeated South Texas Titans, the Taylors make a decision that could shatter what is already a fragile friendship with the McCoys, Landry helps Tyra with her college essay, and Matt frets over telling his grandmother about his college plans.
50	13	"Tomorrow Blues"	Jeffrey Reiner	Jason Katims	January 14, 2009 (DirectTV); April 10, 2009 (NBC)	4.36
Eric's contract is reviewed, Billy and Mindy's wedding day arrives, Tyra awaits word on her college wait-list status, Matt prepares to leave for college, and Tim and Lyla consider their future.

== Reception ==
On Rotten Tomatoes, the season has an approval rating of 100% with an average score of 8.6 out of 10 based on 18 reviews. The website's critical consensus reads, "Fueled by realistic depictions of everyday issues and elevated by an outstanding young cast, the third season of Friday Night Lights finds the series continuing to shine." On the review aggregator website Metacritic, the third season scored 83 out of 100, based on 15 reviews, indicating "Universal acclaim".
