= Tami Knows Best =

- Friday Night Lights episode
- Episode no.: Season 3 Episode 2
- Directed by: Jeffrey Reiner
- Written by: Elizabeth Heldens
- Cinematography by: Todd McMullen
- Editing by: Stephen Michael
- Original release dates: October 8, 2008 (DirecTV); January 23, 2009 (NBC)
- Running time: 43 minutes

Guest appearances
- Gaius Charles as Smash Williams; Kim Dickens as Shelby Saracen; Jeremy Sumpter as J.D. McCoy; D. W. Moffett as Joe McCoy; Janine Turner as Katie McCoy; Brad Leland as Buddy Garrity; Dana Wheeler-Nicholson as Angela Collette

Episode chronology
← Previous "I Knew You When"	Next → "How the Other Half Lives"
- Friday Night Lights (season 3)

"Tami Knows Best" is the second episode of the third season of the American sports drama television series Friday Night Lights, inspired by the 1990 nonfiction book by H. G. Bissinger. It is the 39th overall episode of the series and was written by co-executive producer Elizabeth Heldens, and directed by executive producer Jeffrey Reiner. It originally aired on DirecTV's 101 Network on October 8, 2008, before airing on NBC on January 23, 2009.

The series is set in the fictional town of Dillon, a small, close-knit community in rural West Texas. It follows a high school football team, the Dillon Panthers. It features a set of characters, primarily connected to Coach Eric Taylor, his wife Tami, and their daughter Julie. In the episode, Eric struggles in finding colleges for Smash, while Tami is questioned for her actions. Meanwhile, Tyra begins her class campaign, Tim dines with the Garritys, and Matt receives bad news about his grandmother.

According to Nielsen Media Research, the episode was seen by an estimated 3.96 million household viewers and gained a 1.4/4 ratings share among adults aged 18–49. The episode received very positive reviews from critics, who praised the performances and character development, but criticized Tyra's actions in the episode.

== Plot ==
Lyla (Minka Kelly) and Billy (Derek Phillips) learn that Tim (Taylor Kitsch) has received letters of interest from Oklahoma. At the hospital, Matt (Zach Gilford) is informed that Lorraine's (Louanne Stephens) dementia has worsened and that she has not been taking her pills.

Tami (Connie Britton) is confronted by the Mayor over using the jumbotron funds for the school requirements, as the boosters club raised the money with the intent of buying it. This tarnishes Tami's image, but she continues to stand firm on her decision. Eric (Kyle Chandler) continues training Smash (Gaius Charles), who is still struggling in playing with his knee injury. Eric has also promised that he would get college tryouts, but his phone calls are not answered.

Tyra (Adrianne Palicki) starts running her campaign to become council president, although she is let down when she finds that a poster of her was graffitied. On a suggestion by Landry (Jesse Plemons) and her family, she brings strippers to the school to persuade students in voting for her. The vice principal almost suspends her, until Tami intervenes. During a town meeting with the other candidates, Tyra wins over the students when she talks badly about her competitor, promising that her voters will have sex at the prom if they vote for Tyra. However, Tami is angry at Tyra's decision, and demands that she earns back her self-respect.

Matt is told that he needs to become Lorraine's legal guardian, or she will be placed in an elderly care home. He refuses to become an emancipated minor, but is worried when her condition worsens. He borrows Landry's car to leave for Oklahoma and visit Shelby (Kim Dickens), his mother to whom he has not talked in years. While saddened over leaving him, Shelby signs the papers needed to emancipate him. Tim accompanies Lyla and Buddy (Brad Leland) to dine with the McCoys, with Buddy warning him not to screw his relationship with them, while also disapproving of his relationship with Lyla. The dinner proves to be an uncomfortable experience for Tim, who does not answer questions and is forced to eat a raw pigeon as he is not familiar with the food. Afterwards, Tim and Lyla get into an argument.

Eric gets the Panthers to help Smash train for his new condition. While initially struggling, Smash manages to score many touchdowns. Later, Eric tells him that he was selected by Texas A&M University, and the Williams family is overjoyed. Tim returns home, and is visited by Lyla, who brings him a cheeseburger to compensate for their dinner and make up for the resulting argument. Returning to Dillon, Matt picks up Julie (Aimee Teegarden) near an Applebee's, declaring his emancipation.

== Production ==
=== Development ===
In September 2008, DirecTV announced that the second episode of the season would be titled "Tami Knows Best". The episode was written by co-executive producer Elizabeth Heldens, and directed by executive producer Jeffrey Reiner. This was Heldens' seventh writing credit, and Reiner's 15th directing credit.

== Reception ==
=== Viewers ===
In its original American broadcast on NBC, "Tami Knows Best" was seen by an estimated 3.96 million household viewers with a 1.4/4 in the 18–49 demographics. This means that 1.4 percent of all households with televisions watched the episode, while 4 percent of all of those watching television at the time of the broadcast watched it. This was a 25% decrease in viewership from the previous episode, which was watched by an estimated 5.22 million household viewers with a 1.7/5 in the 18–49 demographics.

=== Critical reviews ===
"Tami Knows Best" received very positive reviews from critics. Eric Goldman of IGN gave the episode a "good" 7.8 out of 10 and wrote, "While not as strong as last week's premiere, I still felt that old, comfortable feeling watching this episode of Friday Night Lights... with one notable exception. Let's get that exception out of the way – I didn't buy Tyra's actions here for a second."

Keith Phipps of The A.V. Club gave the episode a "B" grade and wrote, "I spent most of this episode thinking it was good with patches of shakiness, but when we landed on the shot of Kyle Chandler listening to the Williams family celebrate his longshot chance at Texas A&M;, I remembered why I look forward to this show each week." Ken Tucker of Entertainment Weekly wrote, "Tami Vs. The Jumbotron: Well, this storyline is barreling along nicely, don't you think? Connie Britton excels at playing stressed-out yet tuned-in — her Tami is never more focused than when under attack."

Alan Sepinwall wrote, "Following on last week's B/B+ effort, 'Tami Knows Best' continued to retreat comfortably back into the show's wheelhouse but it added more than a few of those spine-tingling moments I didn't get from 'I Knew You When.'" Erin Fox of TV Guide wrote, "Coach gets a call from Texas A&M about Smash doing a walk-on, and the look on Smash's face when Coach delivers the news in person is so priceless. As is the family's reaction when the door closes and Coach hears them all whooping and hollering. Tears."

Jonathan Pacheco of Slant Magazine wrote, "It took me a while to pinpoint what it was about this episode that rubbed me the wrong way, but I finally did. Watching the events unfold in 'Tami Knows Best,' too much of it seemed contrived. The writers knew where they wanted to end up and they manufactured ways to get there. The problem is, instead of polishing and reworking those scenes, they just left them at that. The moments they did focus on were fantastic; they were emotionally genuine and true to each character. The journey it took to get there just felt wrong." Brett Love of TV Squad wrote, "Overall, another really good episode. They now have me hooked on Smash's story, how things are going to play out with Tami and the boosters, what the blowup means for the Tami/Tyra relationship, and what will come from Matt's reunion with his mother. Lots of balls in the air. It should be a fun season." Television Without Pity gave the episode an "A–" grade.
