= Underdogs (Friday Night Lights) =

- Friday Night Lights episode
- Episode no.: Season 3 Episode 12
- Directed by: Jeffrey Reiner
- Written by: Elizabeth Heldens
- Cinematography by: Todd McMullen
- Editing by: Peter B. Ellis
- Original release dates: January 7, 2009 (DirecTV); April 3, 2009 (NBC)
- Running time: 43 minutes

Guest appearances
- Kim Dickens as Shelby Saracen; Jeremy Sumpter as J.D. McCoy; D. W. Moffett as Joe McCoy; Janine Turner as Katie McCoy; Brad Leland as Buddy Garrity; Dana Wheeler-Nicholson as Angela Collette

Episode chronology
← Previous "A Hard Rain's Gonna Fall"	Next → "Tomorrow Blues"
- Friday Night Lights (season 3)

"Underdogs" is the twelfth episode of the third season of the American sports drama television series Friday Night Lights, inspired by the 1990 nonfiction book by H. G. Bissinger. It is the 49th overall episode of the series and was written by co-executive producer Elizabeth Heldens, and directed by executive producer Jeffrey Reiner. It originally aired on DirecTV's 101 Network on January 7, 2009, before airing on NBC on April 3, 2009.

The series is set in the fictional town of Dillon, a small, close-knit community in rural West Texas. It follows a high school football team, the Dillon Panthers. It features a set of characters, primarily connected to Coach Eric Taylor, his wife Tami, and their daughter Julie. In the episode, the Panthers prepare for the final game against the unbeatable South Texas Titans. Meanwhile, Matt reconsiders his future, Tyra prepares a college application essay and the McCoys face a challenge with authorities.

According to Nielsen Media Research, the episode was seen by an estimated 3.61 million household viewers and gained a 1.2/4 ratings share among adults aged 18–49. The episode received universal acclaim, with critics praising the game's outcome, performances, writing, tone and directing.

== Plot ==
As the Panthers prepare for the state finals, Tami (Connie Britton) is told that she needs to report J.D. (Jeremy Sumpter) to child protective services as she witnessed Joe (D. W. Moffett) hitting him. She consults with Eric (Kyle Chandler), and both agree that they have no choice but to follow the protocol.

Matt (Zach Gilford) starts applying for the School of the Art Institute of Chicago, although he confides to Shelby (Kim Dickens) that he doesn't have enough money to enroll. Their conversation is overheard by Lorraine (Louanne Stephens), who is confused over why would Matt leave. Joe and Katie (Janine Turner) are interrogated by authorities, warning them that they could take J.D. away from them if they find evidence of abuse. J.D. confronts Eric for revealing this to the authorities, despite Eric's claim that he is obligated in reporting it.

Billy (Derek Phillips) tells Tim (Taylor Kitsch) and Lyla (Minka Kelly) that he plans on opening a repair shop, which Tim supports. Lyla tells Buddy (Brad Leland) that she has decided her future will be with Tim, joining him in San Antonio State the following year. Landry (Jesse Plemons) is informed that he will be a key player during the game, so he invites Tyra (Adrianne Palicki) to the game. However, he is disappointed when Tyra says she won't be able to attend due to having to complete her college application essay, and decides to get drunk during a Panthers party. Due to his hangover, he misses he school bus to Austin and gets Tyra to take him. There, Tyra finally reads her essay where she opens up about her dreams and hopes. Landry is touched by her improvement, and they share a kiss.

At Darrell K Royal–Texas Memorial Stadium, the Panthers face the South Texas Titans in the finals, with the latter going on an unbeatable streak. The Panthers struggle against the Titans' defense, and they finish the first half trailing 27-0. Frustrated by J.D.'s behavior, Eric decides to bench him and puts Matt back as the quarterback. The Panthers make a comeback, managing to hit a 28-27 lead with just one minute left in the game. However, the Titans make an aggressive push into the Panthers redzone, eventually getting a chance at a field goal with just six seconds left. The Titans manage to score and win the championship, disappointing the Panthers and Dillon residents. At the locker room, Eric tells the team that he is proud of them and that while they didn't win, they are champions. As the team prepares to leave on the bus, Tim stays for a few minutes in the empty stadium. He places his cleats on the field and leaves the stadium.

== Production ==
=== Development ===
The episode was written by co-executive producer Elizabeth Heldens, and directed by executive producer Jeffrey Reiner. This was Heldens' ninth writing credit, and Reiner's 17th directing credit.

== Reception ==
=== Viewers ===
In its original American broadcast on NBC, "Underdogs" was seen by an estimated 3.61 million household viewers with a 1.2/4 in the 18–49 demographics. This means that 1.2 percent of all households with televisions watched the episode, while 4 percent of all of those watching television at the time of the broadcast watched it. This was a 9% decrease in viewership from the previous episode, which was watched by an estimated 3.95 million household viewers with a 1.2/4 in the 18–49 demographics.

=== Critical reviews ===
"Underdogs" received universal acclaim. Eric Goldman of IGN gave the episode an "amazing" 9.5 out of 10 and wrote, "There are a few things I'm just assuming will be solidified in the finale, including the fact that Matt and Tyra will be free to go to college next year. That's okay, as this is a show not based around big plot twists and turns, but rather observing life and realistically portraying a group of people in a specific place and time. And wow, does Friday Night Lights do this better than almost any show on TV."

Keith Phipps of The A.V. Club gave the episode an "A" grade and wrote, "What's next for the characters? Be it epilogue or transition, we've got one more episode this season to find out. Let's hope it's as good as this week's." Todd Martens of Los Angeles Times wrote, "Says Eric, ‘This is the game people are going to talk about for years to come. This is the game you’re going to talk about.’ And here's hoping it's not the last one we get to see."

Alan Sepinwall wrote, "Beyond the plot and theme, though, what really made 'Underdogs' feel special in spite of its familiarity was the work done by director Jeffrey Reiner and his production team, who, like the Panthers, left it all out there on the field." Erin Fox of TV Guide wrote, "This was his last high school football game, and they didn't win. But, it's an intensely personal, almost sacred moment. He places his cleats on the field, like an offering on an altar, and heads to the bus. Tears."

Jonathan Pacheco of Slant Magazine wrote, "'Underdogs' is the kind of hour of television that defines shows like Friday Night Lights, taking old ideas and making them better, making them new. There's a passion in this episode that shines through in every scene. There's a quiet wisdom, almost atmospheric in its presence. And there's emotion that brings life to each situation, that makes every conflict relatable. 'Underdogs' isn't a season finale, but it sure has the strength and care of one. I just can't get over how much I've fallen in love with this episode." Television Without Pity gave the episode an "A+" grade.

Elizabeth Heldens submitted this episode for consideration for Outstanding Writing for a Drama Series at the 61st Primetime Emmy Awards.
