= How the Other Half Lives (Friday Night Lights) =

- Friday Night Lights episode
- Episode no.: Season 3 Episode 3
- Directed by: Dean White
- Written by: Patrick Massett; John Zinman
- Cinematography by: Todd McMullen
- Editing by: Peter B. Ellis
- Original release dates: October 15, 2008 (DirecTV); January 30, 2009 (NBC)
- Running time: 43 minutes

Guest appearances
- Gaius Charles as Smash Williams; Jeremy Sumpter as J.D. McCoy; D. W. Moffett as Joe McCoy; Brad Leland as Buddy Garrity; Janine Turner as Katie McCoy; Dana Wheeler-Nicholson as Angela Collette

Episode chronology
← Previous "Tami Knows Best"	Next → "Hello, Goodbye"
- Friday Night Lights (season 3)

"How the Other Half Lives" is the third episode of the third season of the American sports drama television series Friday Night Lights, inspired by the 1990 nonfiction book by H. G. Bissinger. It is the 40th overall episode of the series and was written by co-executive producers Patrick Massett and John Zinman, and directed by Dean White. It originally aired on DirecTV's 101 Network on October 15, 2008, before airing on NBC on January 30, 2009.

The series is set in the fictional town of Dillon, a small, close-knit community in rural West Texas. It follows a high school football team, the Dillon Panthers. It features a set of characters, primarily connected to Coach Eric Taylor, his wife Tami, and their daughter Julie. In the episode, the Taylors have different encounters with the McCoys, while Smash and Tim face new dilemmas in their lives.

According to Nielsen Media Research, the episode was seen by an estimated 4.00 million household viewers and gained a 1.4/4 ratings share among adults aged 18–49. The episode received critical acclaim, with critics praising the performances, writing, directing and emotional tone.

== Plot ==
While driving Tim (Taylor Kitsch) home, Billy (Derek Phillips) stops by a home trailer to meet with a partner on a meeting. Eric (Kyle Chandler) prepares for the Panthers' next game against Arnett Meade, as he continues feeling the presence of Joe (D. W. Moffett) on the field.

Tami (Connie Britton) is entrusted to work on an expensive barbecue for the Panthers, but she is stressed over finding the right place. While shopping, she runs into Katie McCoy (Janine Turner) and befriends her, with Katie agreeing to host the barbecue at her house. At the Alamo Freeze, Smash (Gaius Charles) is told by his boss that his fantastic record at the place has made him consider to promote Smash as the regional manager of four new expanded stores. Smash is tempted as the promotion will include a $10,000 raise, bonuses and a company car, and the fact that his mother had to get a new job in order to pay for his college.

Tim discovers that Billy is involved in a scheme where he steals copper wire for profit. Despite his concern about his life with Billy, Tim decides to help Billy in stealing from a yard and abandons Lyla (Minka Kelly). At the barbecue, Matt (Zach Gilford) and Julie (Aimee Teegarden) check the house, and find trophies that show the achievements of J.D. (Jeremy Sumpter). As they laugh, they are approached by J.D., who also makes a joke about his achievements. Eric once again has a talk with Joe, saying that he knows his son is talented but he doesn't know him the same way he knows Matt.

The game between the Panthers and Arnett Mead proves to be a challenge, with the latter slightly winning with just a few seconds left. Despite just getting injured, Matt decides to continue playing. He runs forward to the end zone, but fumbles, causing the Panthers to lose the game. Matt does not leave the field until everyone else has left, except for Julie, who comforts him as they walk home. Smash tells his mother that he will ditch college and take on the regional manager position, but his mother tells him that he doesn't owe her anything and that he needs to maintain his scholarship. Tim reconciles with Lyla, who asks him not to make a fool of her, as she believes he is a good man.

== Production ==
=== Development ===
In October 2008, DirecTV announced that the third episode of the season would be titled "How the Other Half Lives". The episode was written by co-executive producers Patrick Massett and John Zinman, and directed by Dean White. This was Massett's sixth writing credit, Zinman's sixth writing credit, and White's second directing credit.

== Reception ==
=== Viewers ===
In its original American broadcast on NBC, "How the Other Half Lives" was seen by an estimated 4.00 million household viewers with a 1.4/4 in the 18–49 demographics. This means that 1.4 percent of all households with televisions watched the episode, while 4 percent of all of those watching television at the time of the broadcast watched it. This was a slight increase in viewership from the previous episode, which was watched by an estimated 3.96 million household viewers with a 1.4/4 in the 18–49 demographics.

=== Critical reviews ===
"How the Other Half Lives" received critical acclaim. Eric Goldman of IGN gave the episode an "amazing" 9 out of 10 and wrote, "Wow, this show really feels back on track. This was a very strong installment, which lead to some powerful moments in the last act that served as a reminder to just how great and how special Friday Night Lights can be."

Keith Phipps of The A.V. Club gave the episode an "A–" grade and wrote, "For an episode that trafficked heavily in disappointment, this week didn't deliver much disappointment. Its many scenes of characters coming up short were all nicely done and if much of the episode felt like a set-up for bigger developments to come, it also served as a reminder that Friday Night Lights does small moments better than just about any other show."

Alan Sepinwall wrote, "Overall, this episode did a great job of building the obvious tension on Eric and Matt, and then they capped it with one of the show's best, most intense game sequences ever. Great editing, sound design, the works." Erin Fox of TV Guide wrote, "This week was a toughie for the Dillon Panthers. The two themes I really felt coming through via fantastic writing and acting: regret and hope."

Jonathan Pacheco of Slant Magazine wrote, "The shot near the end of the episode seems to indicate that we haven't seen the last of this subplot, and I worry that it will wear out its welcome very quickly. Most of all, I thought Tim was beyond falling for something like this. Tim, consider yourself sucked." Television Without Pity gave the episode an "A" grade.

Patrick Massett and John Zinman submitted this episode for consideration for Outstanding Writing for a Drama Series at the 61st Primetime Emmy Awards.
