= Every Rose Has Its Thorn (Friday Night Lights) =

- Friday Night Lights episode
- Episode no.: Season 3 Episode 5
- Directed by: Jason Katims
- Written by: Kerry Ehrin
- Cinematography by: Todd McMullen
- Editing by: Angela M. Catanzaro
- Original release dates: October 29, 2008 (DirecTV); February 13, 2009 (NBC)
- Running time: 43 minutes

Guest appearances
- Scott Porter as Jason Street; Kim Dickens as Shelby Saracen; Jeremy Sumpter as J.D. McCoy; D. W. Moffett as Joe McCoy; Kevin Rankin as Herc; Brad Leland as Buddy Garrity; Janine Turner as Katie McCoy; Zach Roerig as Cash Waller

Episode chronology
← Previous "Hello, Goodbye"	Next → "It Ain't Easy Being J.D. McCoy"
- Friday Night Lights (season 3)

"Every Rose Has Its Thorn" is the fifth episode of the third season of the American sports drama television series Friday Night Lights, inspired by the 1990 nonfiction book by H. G. Bissinger. It is the 42nd overall episode of the series and was written by consulting producer Kerry Ehrin, and directed by executive producer Jason Katims. It originally aired on DirecTV's 101 Network on October 29, 2008, before airing on NBC on February 13, 2009.

The series is set in the fictional town of Dillon, a small, close-knit community in rural West Texas. It follows a high school football team, the Dillon Panthers. It features a set of characters, primarily connected to Coach Eric Taylor, his wife Tami, and their daughter Julie. In the episode, Eric is forced to make a decision on the leading quarterback. Meanwhile, Jason decides to buy a house in order to build a future with Erin and their baby, while Julie infuriates her parents by getting a tattoo.

According to Nielsen Media Research, the episode was seen by an estimated 3.50 million household viewers and gained a 1.1/4 ratings share among adults aged 18–49. The episode received generally positive reviews from critics, who praised the storylines focused on Jason and Matt, but criticizing the subplots revolving around Julie and Tyra.

== Plot ==
The Panthers struggle during the first quarter of a game against the McNulty Mavericks, as the strategy to switch between Matt (Zach Gilford) and J.D. (Jeremy Sumpter) backfires. For the remainder of the game, Eric (Kyle Chandler) decides to put J.D. as the quarterback, allowing Dillon to make a comeback and get close to tying the game. With a few seconds left, Eric gets Matt into the game, who scores a touchdown to win the game for Dillon. However, Matt leaves dejected while the rest of the crowd hail J.D.

At the house, Julie (Aimee Teegarden) tells her parents that she got a tattoo in her ankle, infuriating them. Tami (Connie Britton) once again questions the influence that Tyra (Adrianne Palicki) had on her daughter. Tyra, meanwhile, continues hanging out with Cash (Zach Roerig). However, their relationship impacts Tyra's academic grades, which is not helping her plans to go to state colleges. When Tami questions Cash's role in her life, Tyra says that Cash is a good person who always supports her.

Jason (Scott Porter) continues living with Herc (Kevin Rankin), and has shared custody with Erin (Tamara Jolaine) over their baby, Noah. He wants to settle into fully living with Erin and Noah, although Erin does not feel her salary can cover all expenses. When he finds that Buddy (Brad Leland) is selling his house, Jason comes up with the idea of buying the house and then flipping it in order to make more money. He and Herc enlist Tim (Taylor Kitsch) and Billy (Derek Phillips) to help in getting money through their copper wire scheme. Billy agrees to sell it to a contact, but they are forced to flee when it is revealed to be Tim's former roommate. Jason finds a new contact, who provides them with enough money to buy the house. However, Buddy refuses to let them buy the house.

Eric's coaching staff wants to prioritize J.D. over Matt as the leading quarterback, despite Matt's fear of getting demoted. Eric does not want to hurt Matt's prospects, but the staff does not want Dillon to face another loss. Eric reluctantly visits Matt at home, informing him that J.D. will be the leading quarterback. Matt is disappointed with the decision, losing motivation in continuing his career. He tells Eric he will quit the team. Eric convinces him in staying, but Matt reiterates that he will hate being on the team and that Eric himself will hate it.

Jason visits Buddy, convincing him in letting him buy the house based on his football merits. He delivers the news to Erin, but is devastated when she tells him that she is moving back to the East Coast as she believes nothing is working. Tami confides in Julie that her tattoo only reminded her of her almost dropping out of high school amidst her struggles, and Julie expresses that she won't let that happen. At home, Matt talks with Shelby (Kim Dickens) over his demotion, and she consoles him as they share cookies. Matt shows up for training, seeing J.D. practice with the team.

== Production ==
=== Development ===
In October 2008, DirecTV announced that the fifth episode of the season would be titled "Every Rose Has Its Thorn". The episode was written by consulting producer Kerry Ehrin, and directed by executive producer Jason Katims. This was Ehrin's seventh writing credit, and Katims' first directing credit.

== Reception ==
=== Viewers ===
In its original American broadcast on NBC, "Every Rose Has Its Thorn" was seen by an estimated 3.50 million household viewers with a 1.1/4 in the 18–49 demographics. This means that 1.1 percent of all households with televisions watched the episode, while 4 percent of all of those watching television at the time of the broadcast watched it. This was a 17% decrease in viewership from the previous episode, which was watched by an estimated 4.21 million household viewers with a 1.4/4 in the 18–49 demographics.

=== Critical reviews ===
"Every Rose Has Its Thorn" received generally positive reviews from critics. Eric Goldman of IGN gave the episode a "good" 7.8 out of 10 and wrote, "I'd been waiting to use the "Finally Jason Street has come back" reference to The Rock since the season began, only because I assumed Jason was no longer in Dillon. After all, everyone seemed to be speaking about him in the past tense. But this episode actually showed that he was still living in town; still hanging out with Tim; and still working for Buddy. It felt a bit odd – it would have worked better if we'd had some mentions of other characters seeing him before now – but regardless, it was just nice to see him again, and of course the likable actor who plays him, Scott Porter."

Keith Phipps of The A.V. Club gave the episode a "B" grade and wrote, "Saracen does not take the news of his demotion well. And while, with its emphasis on set-up over payoff, this was inevitably a less memorable episode of FNL than last week's stirring hour, I think it was as fine a showcase for Zach Gilford as we've seen." Todd Martens of Los Angeles Times wrote, "If Friday Night Lights spent its first four episodes dealing with football and community concerns, what with the whole JumboTron saga and Smash's college tryout, Episode 5 goes straight to the heart."

Alan Sepinwall wrote, "Outside of Saracen's story and the Street half of the Street/Riggins plot, 'Every Rose Has Its Thorn' was slow and/or repetitive of other storylines the show had done in the past - and, in some cases, weren't very good the first time around." Erin Fox of TV Guide wrote, "This week is about life changing shifts for many of our favorite Dillon residents. Matt and J.D. deal with shifting duties, Coach must shift his team without shifting loyalty or faith, Tami must shift her attitude toward Julie as a young girl and start thinking of her as a young woman, Tyra struggles with being a student versus a girlfriend and most moving is Jason Street's shift from a boy to a man — from a guy waiting on the sidelines for life to happen, to the guy who makes the winning play."

Jonathan Pacheco of Slant Magazine wrote, "This story isn't needed to advance any sort of plot, but it didn't feel out of place in the episode. It could easily have been botched, but I think it was held afloat by the choice to let Tami get things wrong at first." Television Without Pity gave the episode an "A–" grade.
