= Hello, Goodbye (Friday Night Lights) =

- Friday Night Lights episode
- Episode no.: Season 3 Episode 4
- Directed by: Michael Waxman
- Written by: David Hudgins
- Cinematography by: Todd McMullen
- Editing by: Ron Rosen
- Original release dates: October 22, 2008 (DirecTV); February 6, 2009 (NBC)
- Running time: 43 minutes

Guest appearances
- Gaius Charles as Smash Williams; Kim Dickens as Shelby Saracen; Jeremy Sumpter as J.D. McCoy; D. W. Moffett as Joe McCoy; Janine Turner as Katie McCoy; Brad Leland as Buddy Garrity; Zach Roerig as Cash Waller

Episode chronology
| ← Previous "How the Other Half Lives" | Next → "Every Rose Has Its Thorn" |
- Friday Night Lights (season 3)

"Hello, Goodbye" is the fourth episode of the third season of the American sports drama television series Friday Night Lights, inspired by the 1990 nonfiction book by H. G. Bissinger. It is the 41st overall episode of the series and was written by co-executive producer David Hudgins, and directed by co-producer Michael Waxman. It originally aired on DirecTV's 101 Network on October 22, 2008, before airing on NBC on February 6, 2009.

The series is set in the fictional town of Dillon, a small, close-knit community in rural West Texas. It follows a high school football team, the Dillon Panthers. It features a set of characters, primarily connected to Coach Eric Taylor, his wife Tami, and their daughter Julie. In the episode, Smash prepares for the try-outs that decide his future. Meanwhile, Tami tries to win over the recent controversy, Matt asks his mother for help, and Tyra meets a new guy. The episode marked the last appearance of Gaius Charles as Smash Williams in the series.

According to Nielsen Media Research, the episode was seen by an estimated 4.21 million household viewers and gained a 1.4/4 ratings share among adults aged 18–49. The episode received critical acclaim, with critics praising closure on the character of Smash Williams.

== Plot ==
Tim (Taylor Kitsch), Lyla (Minka Kelly), Tyra (Adrianne Palicki) and Landry (Jesse Plemons) go to a rodeo show. The girls are delighted with a Dillon cowboy, Cash Waller (Zach Roerig), who winks at Tyra from the field. Later, Tyra and Cash dance at a bar.

As the conflict over the jumbotron continues, Tami (Connie Britton) is conflicted over what to do. While jogging with Katie (Janine Turner), she suggests that Tami should speak with superintendent Paul Dunley (David Born) to convince him in choosing her. Tami "runs into" him at a restaurant, and starts talking about the benefits of reallocating the funds, but Dunley leaves after he feels uncomfortable with the situation. That night, Tami laments her decision, but Eric (Kyle Chandler) tells her that her posture is the right thing to do.

Matt (Zach Gilford) struggles in taking care of Lorraine (Louanne Stephens), so he asks Shelby (Kim Dickens) for her help in taking care to the doctor. When Shelby starts talking with Julie (Aimee Teegarden), Matt tells her to leave, as he still has not forgiven her for abandoning him. After talking with Lorraine, Matt meets again with Shelby, who explains that her decision to leave was mainly due to his father's behavior. While she knows she cannot be forgiven, she wants to help him, and Matt allows her. Tyra lies to Landry, who asked for her to accompany him after removing his wisdom tooth, and instead goes out with Cash. When he realizes this, Landry confronts her, despite their relationship having ended months ago. When he asks her to choose one of them, Tyra chooses Cash.

During bye week, Eric takes Smash (Gaius Charles) to Texas A&M University for the try-outs. While initially rescheduled, Smash is allowed to play, impressing the coach. Back in Dillon, Eric informs Matt and J.D. (Jeremy Sumpter) that they will both play equal time in the coming game. At a ceremony, Tami announces that they will receive a jumbotron, although she makes Buddy (Brad Leland) host PTA meetings at his dealership free of charge. Smash receives a phone call, confirming that he has been selected by Texas A&M. He visits Eric to inform him and thank him. Smash then leaves with Matt, Tim and Landry, playing at the field one last time before he leaves.

== Production ==
=== Development ===
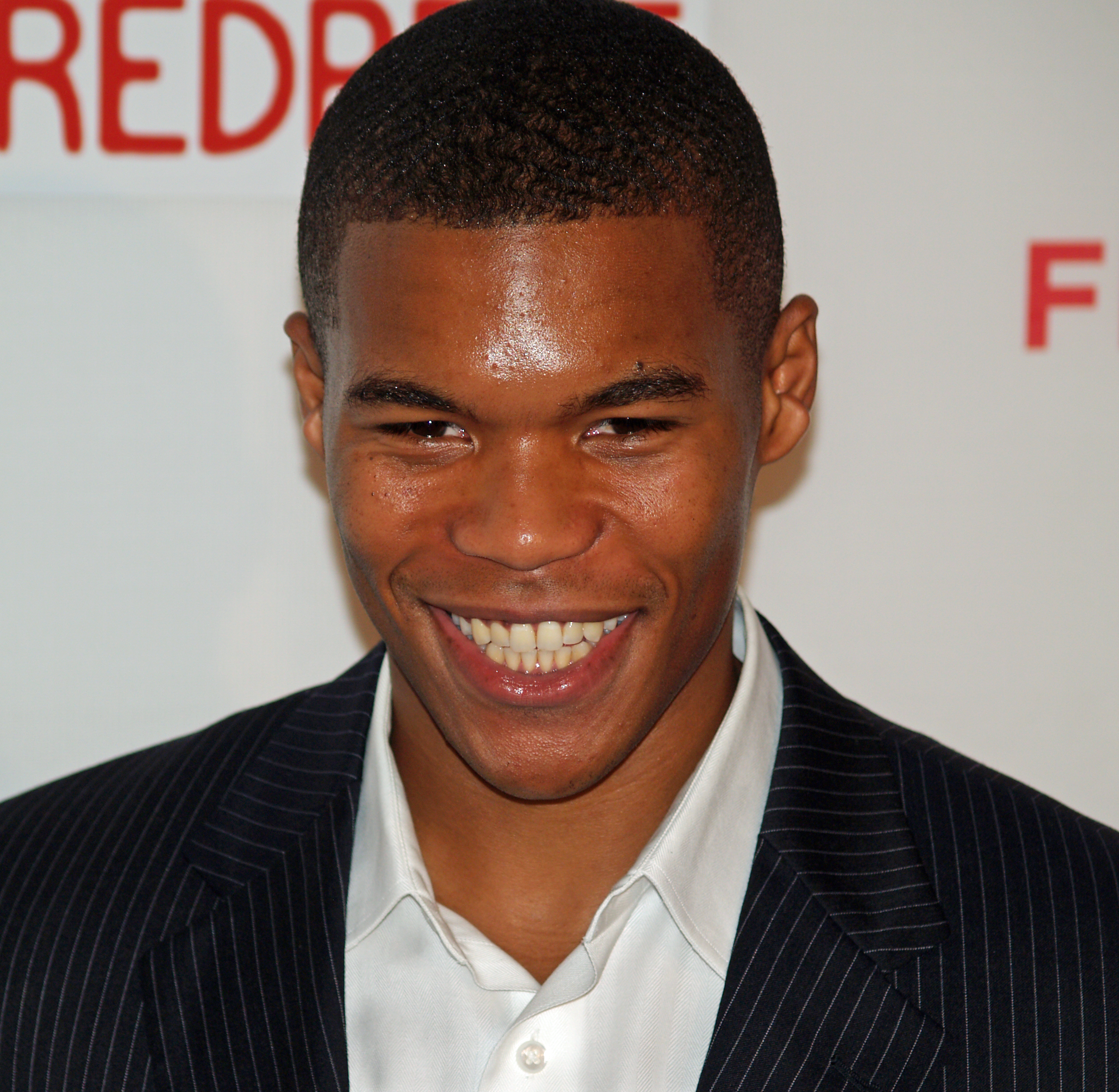
The episode marked Gaius Charles' last appearance in the series.

In October 2008, DirecTV announced that the fourth episode of the season would be titled "Hello, Goodbye". The episode was written by co-executive producer David Hudgins, and directed by co-producer Michael Waxman. This was Hudgins' seventh writing credit, and Waxman's second directing credit.

=== Casting ===
In July 2008, it was announced that Gaius Charles would leave the series after appearing in four episodes, with Jason Katims explaining that the decision was done to "launch [himself] into the next phase of [his life]." Katims previously said that Smash's graduation created "a challenge" for the writers, and that his story arc would "require some finessing and the right balance between taking the right amount of poetic license but not doing anything that would question the authenticity and believability that is so important to our show."

Charles said that he felt "real peace" about his departure, saying "At a certain point, you want to leave the bar at its highest. I wouldn't want them to just keep me on the show in some holding pattern just to keep me there. If Smash is there, I want him to be pushing the envelope. You don't want to be furniture."

== Reception ==
=== Viewers ===
In its original American broadcast on NBC, "Hello, Goodbye" was seen by an estimated 4.21 million household viewers with a 1.4/4 in the 18–49 demographics. This means that 1.4 percent of all households with televisions watched the episode, while 4 percent of all of those watching television at the time of the broadcast watched it. This was a 5% increase in viewership from the previous episode, which was watched by an estimated 4.00 million household viewers with a 1.4/4 in the 18–49 demographics.

=== Critical reviews ===
"Hello, Goodbye" received critical acclaim. Eric Goldman of IGN gave the episode a "great" 8.8 out of 10 and wrote, "This episode served as another huge reminder that Coach Eric Taylor is, quite simply, awesome. What's amazing is how a character this kind and caring and smart can actually play not as a cliché or someone overly sappy, but as truly real, which is thanks to the work of the writers and of course Kyle Chandler's excellent performance."

Keith Phipps of The A.V. Club gave the episode an "A" grade and wrote, "This was just an exemplary outing from beginning to end."

Alan Sepinwall wrote, ""Hello, Goodbye" was easily the most spine-tingling episode of the season so far - I enjoyed the previous three, but this was the first that felt on the same level as the best of season one - and nowhere was it more chill-tastic than the moment where Coach charged across the A&M practice field to ensure that Smash got a fair shot at a walk-on job." Todd Martens of Los Angeles Times wrote, "The writing team even weaned viewers off him, announcing two episodes ago that Smash had a walk-on tryout at Texas A&M this very week. And that tryout was grand, a tension-filled scene loaded with respect and fear."

Erin Fox of TV Guide wrote, "the episode is so incredible and really speaks for itself: Smash gets news that will change his life forever while Matt's fate as the Dillon Panthers' QB hangs in the balance. Will J.D. take over as starter? Will Smash make it to college?" Jonathan Pacheco of Slant Magazine wrote, "Roughly a third of the way through the third season, 'Hello, Goodbye' marks a shift in the storytelling, ending a few arcs while beginning some others. While it's not a perfect episode, it touches on greatness in a variety of different ways, leaving me with several lingering memories. This is one of my favorite episodes in a long time."

Daniel Fienberg of Zap2it wrote that the episode, "wasn't just the season's best episode to date, it was probably the series' best episode since Season One." Television Without Pity gave the episode an "A+" grade.

Michael Waxman submitted this episode for consideration for Outstanding Directing for a Drama Series, while David Hudgins submitted it for Outstanding Writing for a Drama Series at the 61st Primetime Emmy Awards.
