= The Giving Tree (Friday Night Lights) =

- Friday Night Lights episode
- Episode no.: Season 3 Episode 10
- Directed by: David Boyd
- Written by: Elizabeth Heldens
- Cinematography by: Todd McMullen
- Editing by: Angela M. Catanzaro
- Original release dates: December 10, 2008 (DirecTV); March 20, 2009 (NBC)
- Running time: 43 minutes

Guest appearances
- Jeremy Sumpter as J.D. McCoy; D. W. Moffett as Joe McCoy; Janine Turner as Katie McCoy; Brad Leland as Buddy Garrity; Dana Wheeler-Nicholson as Angela Collette

Episode chronology
| ← Previous "Game of the Week" | Next → "A Hard Rain's Gonna Fall" |
- Friday Night Lights (season 3)

"The Giving Tree" is the tenth episode of the third season of the American sports drama television series Friday Night Lights, inspired by the 1990 nonfiction book by H. G. Bissinger. It is the 47th overall episode of the series and was written by co-executive producer Elizabeth Heldens, and directed by David Boyd. It originally aired on DirecTV's 101 Network on December 10, 2008, before airing on NBC on March 20, 2009.

The series is set in the fictional town of Dillon, a small, close-knit community in rural West Texas. It follows a high school football team, the Dillon Panthers. It features a set of characters, primarily connected to Coach Eric Taylor, his wife Tami, and their daughter Julie. In the episode, Buddy gets in trouble after attacking an old friend, while the Taylors face a dilemma with Julie and Matt. Meanwhile, Tyra asks Landry for help, and J.D. faces his father when he interferes in a relationship.

According to Nielsen Media Research, the episode was seen by an estimated 3.84 million household viewers and gained a 1.2/4 ratings share among adults aged 18–49. The episode received critical acclaim, with critics praising the performances, writing, tone and themes.

== Plot ==
Tyra (Adrianne Palicki) returns to Dillon, confiding in Julie (Aimee Teegarden) that she feels her academic career and college potential is over due to her absence. At the strip club, Buddy (Brad Leland) meets with a friend over an investment that Buddy made. The friend confirms that he lost the investment, causing an angry Buddy to attack him. Police authorities arrive and Buddy is arrested.

With Buddy in jail, Tami (Connie Britton) decides to invite Lyla (Minka Kelly) to move in with the Taylors for the night. Julie and Matt (Zach Gilford) consummate their relationship, only to be caught by Eric (Kyle Chandler) as he was picking her up, causing friction. At night, Eric tells Tami about the events, shocking her. She tries to have a conversation with Julie about it, but none really open up about their feelings. Needing help for her incoming SAT tests, Tyra asks Landry (Jesse Plemons) to tutor her, which he accepts. The sessions prove to be fruitless, as Tyra continues delaying or struggling in the questions. Eventually, Landry confronts her over using him, comparing her to the book The Giving Tree. To make up, Tyra gets a club to sign Landry's band to play on Saturday.

Buddy is charged with drunk and disorderly, assault and battery, and inflicting $30,000 of damage to the strip club. He is bailed on $10,000 after he declares himself not guilty, and downplays his actions to Lyla. When he confesses that they are in big trouble due to losing investment, Lyla offers her college money, until Buddy confesses that he used the money for the investment. Upset, Lyla decides to move out of Buddy's apartment and moves in with Tim (Taylor Kitsch). Buddy once again pleads for her to come back home, but Lyla calls him out on his selfishness before Tim asks him to leave his property.

During a Panthers party, J.D. (Jeremy Sumpter) becomes smitten with a girl, Madison (Whitney Hoy). She starts visiting at home, and her presence unnerves Joe (D. W. Moffett). Joe tells J.D. that he should be focused on the state championship, asking him to not pursue Madison until the season is over. Before leaving for the game, J.D. asks for a pause in her relationship to Madison, disappointing her. Seeing this, Tim tells J.D. that he needs to form his own path, as the team cannot support him if he cannot decide for himself. Tami eventually has the conversation with Julie, expressing that she only wants to make sure she feels happy with herself and not to let herself get pressured into doing something she does not want to do, and they embrace. Matt also has a talk with Eric, who tells him that women are to be respected, an ideology he shares with Matt's father.

During the Panthers game against the Buckley Bisons, Eric lashes out at the referee for not flagging the other team, causing Eric to be ejected from the game. Despite the assistant coach's inexperience, the Panthers manage to win the game and move forward in the playoffs. As Katie (Janine Turner) and Joe have an argument over his treatment of J.D., they see J.D. leaving with Madison on her car, to Joe's chagrin and Katie's delight. Tyra and Julie attend Landry's band's performance, which surprises them. Buddy leaves a message to Lyla, admitting his mistake and saying he loves her before hanging up.

== Production ==
=== Development ===
In December 2008, DirecTV announced that the tenth episode of the season would be titled "The Giving Tree". The episode was written by co-executive producer Elizabeth Heldens, and directed by David Boyd. This was Heldens' eighth writing credit, and Boyd's fifth directing credit.

== Reception ==
=== Viewers ===
In its original American broadcast on NBC, "The Giving Tree" was seen by an estimated 3.84 million household viewers with a 1.2/4 in the 18–49 demographics. This means that 1.2 percent of all households with televisions watched the episode, while 4 percent of all of those watching television at the time of the broadcast watched it. This was a 13% decrease in viewership from the previous episode, which was watched by an estimated 4.40 million household viewers with a 1.5/5 in the 18–49 demographics.

=== Critical reviews ===
"The Giving Tree" received critical acclaim. Eric Goldman of IGN gave the episode an "amazing" 9 out of 10 and wrote, "It seems the Friday Night Lights writers definitely agreed the girls on the show were being neglected a bit, because they've really picked up the storylines for the female contingent of the series. This episode in fact had great material for all four female leads, who each found themselves facing some serious dramatic hurdles."

Keith Phipps of The A.V. Club gave the episode an "A–" grade and wrote, "More than usual, this was an episode about children and parents so let's first get the stuff that'snot about that, specifically the sub-plot that gives the episode its title."

Alan Sepinwall wrote, "'The Giving Tree' is one of the stronger episodes of season three, but it's also an odd one, in that most of the plots played out like Friday Night Lights Greatest Hits." Erin Fox of TV Guide wrote, "Buddy calls Lyla's cell to apologize properly, and sounds pathetic, lonely and sad. It really sounds like a suicide call, but Buddy is way to narcissistic to do that."

Jonathan Pacheco of Slant Magazine wrote, "In 'The Giving Tree,' the futures of several students are either given or taken away by the actions of other people, which is an idea that I like on paper, but as executed, the episode itself ends up being neither particularly good nor bad, just mostly uninspired." Television Without Pity gave the episode an "A+" grade.
