= It Ain't Easy Being J.D. McCoy =

- Friday Night Lights episode
- Episode no.: Season 3 Episode 6
- Directed by: Patrick Norris
- Written by: Bridget Carpenter
- Cinematography by: Todd McMullen
- Editing by: Stephen Michael
- Original release dates: November 5, 2008 (DirecTV); February 20, 2009 (NBC)
- Running time: 43 minutes

Guest appearances
- Scott Porter as Jason Street; Jeremy Sumpter as J.D. McCoy; D. W. Moffett as Joe McCoy; Janine Turner as Katie McCoy; Kevin Rankin as Herc; Brad Leland as Buddy Garrity; Zach Roerig as Cash Waller; Dana Wheeler-Nicholson as Angela Collette

Episode chronology
← Previous "Every Rose Has Its Thorn"	Next → "Keeping Up Appearances"
- Friday Night Lights (season 3)

"It Ain't Easy Being J.D. McCoy" is the sixth episode of the third season of the American sports drama television series Friday Night Lights, inspired by the 1990 nonfiction book by H. G. Bissinger. It is the 43rd overall episode of the series and was written by supervising producer Bridget Carpenter, and directed by Patrick Norris. It originally aired on DirecTV's 101 Network on November 5, 2008, before airing on NBC on February 20, 2009.

The series is set in the fictional town of Dillon, a small, close-knit community in rural West Texas. It follows a high school football team, the Dillon Panthers. It features a set of characters, primarily connected to Coach Eric Taylor, his wife Tami, and their daughter Julie. In the episode, Eric forces Tim to show more support towards J.D. after he is subjected to a hazing ritual. Meanwhile, Tyra is shocked when a woman shows up claiming Cash owes her child support.

According to Nielsen Media Research, the episode was seen by an estimated 3.93 million household viewers and gained a 1.4/4 ratings share among adults aged 18–49. The episode received critical acclaim, with critics praising the focus on the character of J.D. McCoy, performances and tone.

== Plot ==
The Panthers host a hazing ritual, in which freshmen participate in the "Naked Mile", in which they must run to the nearby water tower. However, J.D. (Jeremy Sumpter) is forced to run all the way to the field house and retrieve the state championship portrait as he is the quarterback. However, Eric (Kyle Chandler) catches him but promises to take him home and not tell Joe (D. W. Moffett).

In the morning, Jason (Scott Porter) bids farewell to Erin (Tamara Jolaine) and Noah as they leave town. He continues with the plan to flip the house in order to turn a profit, with the help of Herc (Kevin Rankin), Tim (Taylor Kitsch) and Billy (Derek Phillips). However, they do not follow his specific instructions, go over-budget and Billy accidentally nails his hand with a gun during an argument with Jason. Jason runs into Eric, who notes his predicament and concern that he should abandon his idea. Eric tells him that he should continue forward if he really believes in the project.

Eric meets with Tim, scolding for leading the hazing. He tells him that as the team's captain, he must make sure that J.D. knows the team supports him. That night, Tim takes J.D. on a ride across town, explaining the background on many of the establishments before dropping him off at his house. As the Panthers prepare for their game against Westerby, Eric is confronted by Lorraine (Louanne Stephens) for demoting Matt (Zach Gilford), but he says it is nothing personal. Dillon wins the game, and Joe personally visits the locker room to congratulate J.D. and the team, taking him to dine with his family instead of going out with the team to celebrate.

Tyra (Adrianne Palicki) relates to Cash (Zach Roerig) her problems with the lack of funds, so Cash gives her a wad of dollars to help her. She debates on taking it, but Angela (Dana Wheeler-Nicholson) tells her that she needs a man like Cash to get her out of trouble. However, Tyra is surprised when a woman shows up at her house with a baby. The woman says that she needs to tell Cash that she owes her $1,600 in child support, shocking Tyra. The next day, Cash shows up at her work, but Tyra kicks him out, telling him she knows about the woman and her child. Landry (Jesse Plemons) searches for a new guitarist for his band when the previous member quits. He is impressed by a girl, Devin (Stephanie Hunt), and gets her as the newest band. Noting Landry's lyrics relate to a girl, Devin says Landry needs to move on from his break-up.

At a school dance, Tim and Lyla (Minka Kelly) get J.D. to accompany them to another party near a lake. Per his team's insistence, J.D. gets drunk for the first time in his life. Cash visits Tyra, explaining that the woman, Ali, was a one-night stand. When she kept harassing him, he left his hometown in Wyoming, until Ali tracked him with a baby, which he claims is not his. Tyra accepts his story and they reconcile. Matt and Julie (Aimee Teegarden) talk near a campfire, where they kiss and spend the night together. They see each other at church, where Eric is informed by Joe and J.D. that J.D. got drunk the previous night, with Joe disappointed in his son. While continuing on the house, Jason talks with Erin and Noah on the phone, singing "There's a Hole in My Bucket".

== Production ==
=== Development ===
In October 2008, DirecTV announced that the sixth episode of the season would be titled "It Ain't Easy Being J.D. McCoy". The episode was written by supervising producer Bridget Carpenter, and directed by Patrick Norris. This was Carpenter's fifth writing credit, and Norris' third directing credit.

== Reception ==
=== Viewers ===
In its original American broadcast on NBC, "It Ain't Easy Being J.D. McCoy" was seen by an estimated 3.93 million household viewers with a 1.4/4 in the 18–49 demographics. This means that 1.4 percent of all households with televisions watched the episode, while 4 percent of all of those watching television at the time of the broadcast watched it. This was a 12% increase in viewership from the previous episode, which was watched by an estimated 3.50 million household viewers with a 1.1/4 in the 18–49 demographics.

=== Critical reviews ===
"It Ain't Easy Being J.D. McCoy" received critical acclaim. Eric Goldman of IGN gave the episode an "amazing" 9.3 out of 10 and wrote, "It's funny how an episode of Friday Night Lights can stand out as so wonderful, even without really being about any huge events. This isn't a show that hinges on twists and turns or big revelations, but on character moments, and this episode had a lot of tremendous ones."

Keith Phipps of The A.V. Club gave the episode an "A–" grade, praising its long "hang-out time with the characters" and lack of "high drama".

Alan Sepinwall wrote, "A few weeks back, I asked whether J.D. McCoy was bad or just drawn that way. I think we have our answer. And I officially feel really sorry for our new QB1." Todd Martens of Los Angeles Times wrote, "If the first five episodes of the third season of Friday Night Lights were packed with plot, community politics and working-class realities, this week showed viewers that the drama in the fictional town of Dillon, Texas, is sometimes little more than some freshman hazing, inspirational speeches, drunken silliness and good ol' rock 'n' roll"

Erin Fox of TV Guide wrote, "Jason asks if he can talk to Noah, and he sings to him. It's the cutest thing I've ever seen — even though the house crew looks like they want to gag. Adorable." Jonathan Pacheco of Slant Magazine wrote, "Again, all they can do is smile goofily at each other. It's slightly cheesy and a tad optimistic, but I also found it to be a bit beautiful. We could all use some romantic optimism every once in a while."

Daniel Fienberg of Zap2it wrote, "This Wednesday's DirecTV episode, titled "It Ain't Easy Being J.D. McCoy" put the show back on solid footing and included at least one massive plot development." Television Without Pity gave the episode an "A" grade.

Patrick Norris submitted this episode for consideration for Outstanding Directing for a Drama Series at the 61st Primetime Emmy Awards.
