= A Hard Rain's Gonna Fall =

- Friday Night Lights episode
- Episode no.: Season 3 Episode 11
- Directed by: Michael Waxman
- Written by: Bridget Carpenter; Patrick Massett; John Zinman
- Cinematography by: Todd McMullen
- Editing by: Stephen Michael
- Original release dates: December 17, 2008 (DirecTV); March 27, 2009 (NBC)
- Running time: 43 minutes

Guest appearances
- Kim Dickens as Shelby Saracen; Jeremy Sumpter as J.D. McCoy; Brad Leland as Buddy Garrity; Janine Turner as Katie McCoy; D. W. Moffett as Joe McCoy; Dana Wheeler-Nicholson as Angela Collette

Episode chronology
← Previous "The Giving Tree"	Next → "Underdogs"
- Friday Night Lights (season 3)

"A Hard Rain's Gonna Fall" is the eleventh episode of the third season of the American sports drama television series Friday Night Lights, inspired by the 1990 nonfiction book by H. G. Bissinger. It is the 48th overall episode of the series and was written by supervising producer Bridget Carpenter and co-executive producers Patrick Massett and John Zinman, and directed by co-producer Michael Waxman. It originally aired on DirecTV's 101 Network on December 17, 2008, before airing on NBC on March 27, 2009.

The series is set in the fictional town of Dillon, a small, close-knit community in rural West Texas. It follows a high school football team, the Dillon Panthers. It features a set of characters, primarily connected to Coach Eric Taylor, his wife Tami, and their daughter Julie. In the episode, a change threatens to dismantle the Panthers as they prepare for the semifinals. Meanwhile, Matt faces bigger problems with Lorraine, Tyra prepares a bridal shower for Mindy, and J.D. continues being pressured by his father in abandoning his relationship.

According to Nielsen Media Research, the episode was seen by an estimated 3.95 million household viewers and gained a 1.2/4 ratings share among adults aged 18–49. The episode received extremely positive reviews from critics, who praised the performances, character development and emotional tone.

== Plot ==
Tyra (Adrianne Palicki) helps Mindy in preparing for her bridal shower, still nervous about her SAT results. J.D. (Jeremy Sumpter) continues seeing Madison (Whitney Hoy), although his delays during training start bothering Eric (Kyle Chandler).

As Shelby (Kim Dickens) prepares to take Lorraine (Louanne Stephens) to the market, she exits the car while moving, falling into the ground. Matt (Zach Gilford) and Shelby take her to the hospital, where the doctor tells them that while Lorraine is not injured, her mental health is deteriorating. Matt refuses to listen to the doctor's warnings and also ignores Shelby's pleas to consider Lorraine's health, telling her to leave him. However, Matt experiences trouble later on when Lorraine's mental health affects his personal life.

Tami (Connie Britton) gets involved in a town debate as Superintendent Dunley announces a redistricting strategy, which would open a new school. Some townspeople, Eric included, are not delighted by the news, as the Panthers team would have to let go some of its talent. Lyla (Minka Kelly) continues avoiding Buddy (Brad Leland), so the latter asks Tim (Taylor Kitsch) to help him. Tim only suggests that he needs to give time to Lyla to think about everything. Later, Lyla discovers that she has been named as a potential candidate for Vanderbilt University, her preferred college. Buddy is overjoyed, but Lyla is upset as she won't have the money needed to enroll.

Joe (D. W. Moffett) is upset by J.D.'s relationship, feeling that it will negatively impact his performance. He angrily calls Madison's parents to dissuade them from allowing her to see J.D., but it backfires. Tyra is stressed by the tasks needed for the bridal shower and asks Landry (Jesse Plemons) to help her. While organizing the event, Landry finds that she passed the SAT, but she is still not content as she feels it is not enough. The bridal shower is forced to reallocate inside the Colletes' house as a storm arrives in Dillon. During the semifinals, J.D. struggles with completing his passes after Eric tells him to maintain the same tactics. Nevertheless, J.D. recovers to mark a win for Dillon, ensuring them a spot in the finals.

After the game, Matt apologizes to Shelby, admitting that he believes the situation with Lorraine is not working. Outside a celebration at Applebee's, J.D. and Joe get into a heated argument and Joe starts hitting him. Eric and Tami intervene, as Joe walks away. Eric allows J.D. and Katie (Janine Turner) to stay with them, letting J.D. know that he is not alone. Tim skips celebrating the game to stay with Lyla, saying that he will support any decision she makes. Billy (Derek Phillips) picks up Mindy from the bridal shower, as Tyra and Angela (Dana Wheeler-Nicholson) stay. Tyra starts crying, lamenting that nothing is working in her life. Angela consoles her, saying that she loves Tyra's unpredictability and that she will get everything she wants, and they embrace.

== Production ==
=== Development ===
In December 2008, DirecTV announced that the eleventh episode of the season would be titled "A Hard Rain's Gonna Fall". The episode was written by supervising producer Bridget Carpenter, and co-executive producers Patrick Massett and John Zinman, and directed by co-producer Michael Waxman. This was Carpenter's sixth writing credit, Massett's seventh writing credit, Zinman's seventh writing credit, and Waxman's fourth directing credit.

== Reception ==
=== Viewers ===
In its original American broadcast on NBC, "A Hard Rain's Gonna Fall" was seen by an estimated 3.95 million household viewers with a 1.2/4 in the 18–49 demographics. This means that 1.2 percent of all households with televisions watched the episode, while 4 percent of all of those watching television at the time of the broadcast watched it. This was a slight increase in viewership from the previous episode, which was watched by an estimated 3.84 million household viewers with a 1.2/4 in the 18–49 demographics.

=== Critical reviews ===
"A Hard Rain's Gonna Fall" received extremely positive reviews from critics. Eric Goldman of IGN gave the episode an "amazing" 9.2 out of 10 and wrote, "This was one big heartbreaking episode, which is saying something, given how effortlessly this show seems to be able to somehow be incredibly emotional without coming off as overly sentimental."

Keith Phipps of The A.V. Club gave the episode a "B" grade and wrote, "It would probably take more time to confirm the notion than it's really worth, but I would venture that tonight's episode of Friday Night Lights had more earnest, heart-to-heart talks than any episode before it." Todd Martens of Los Angeles Times wrote, "While it wasn’t necessarily out of character, as Joe has been inflicting abuse on his son all season long, it was a bit much, especially for this emotionally-charged episode. It was stronger when the abuse was just a series of mind games."

Alan Sepinwall wrote, "The episode did a great job of laying the groundwork for Joe McCoy's explosion, as he let various perceived mistakes and violations by J.D. just build and build in his mind until he couldn't think straight anymore." Erin Fox of TV Guide wrote, "Hoo-boy! They weren't messing around when they titled this episode, 'A Hard Rain's Gonna Fall'."

Jonathan Pacheco of Slant Magazine wrote, "“It’s gonna blow, don’t ya know.” It's a phrase that a Dallas sports radio host was fond of saying back when the polarizing Terrell Owens joined the Cowboys. Since very early on in Season 3 of Friday Night Lights, the phrase has been looping in my head. For nearly the duration of the season, Joe McCoy's fuse has been burning, and it was only a matter of time until the man did something drastic." Television Without Pity gave the episode an "A+" grade.

Bridget Carpenter, Patrick Massett, and John Zinman submitted this episode for consideration for Outstanding Writing for a Drama Series at the 61st Primetime Emmy Awards.
