= Game of the Week =

Game of the Week may refer to:

- Major League Baseball Game of the Week
- NFL Films Game of the Week
- NHL Game of the Week
- NBC College Football Game of the Week
- MLS Game of the Week
- America's Game of the Week, a brand used by NFL on Fox
- Game of the Week (Friday Night Lights), an episode of the TV series Friday Night Lights
