= Keeping Up Appearances (Friday Night Lights) =

- Friday Night Lights episode
- Episode no.: Season 3 Episode 7
- Directed by: Chris Eyre
- Written by: Brent Fletcher
- Cinematography by: Todd McMullen
- Editing by: Margaret Guinee
- Original release dates: November 12, 2008 (DirecTV); February 27, 2009 (NBC)
- Running time: 43 minutes

Guest appearances
- Scott Porter as Jason Street; Jeremy Sumpter as J.D. McCoy; D. W. Moffett as Joe McCoy; Kevin Rankin as Herc; Brad Leland as Buddy Garrity; Janine Turner as Katie McCoy

Episode chronology
← Previous "It Ain't Easy Being J.D. McCoy"	Next → "New York, New York"
- Friday Night Lights (season 3)

"Keeping Up Appearances" is the seventh episode of the third season of the American sports drama television series Friday Night Lights, inspired by the 1990 nonfiction book by H. G. Bissinger. It is the 44th overall episode of the series and was written by Brent Fletcher, and directed by Chris Eyre. It originally aired on DirecTV's 101 Network on November 12, 2008, before airing on NBC on February 27, 2009.

The series is set in the fictional town of Dillon, a small, close-knit community in rural West Texas. It follows a high school football team, the Dillon Panthers. It features a set of characters, primarily connected to Coach Eric Taylor, his wife Tami, and their daughter Julie. In the episode, Jason sets out in selling the house with the help of Tim, Billy and Herc. Meanwhile, Eric has a problem with two players in the team, while Landry considers expressing his feelings for his new friend.

According to Nielsen Media Research, the episode was seen by an estimated 4.22 million household viewers and gained a 1.5/5 ratings share among adults aged 18–49. The episode received positive reviews from critics, with particular praise towards Scott Porter's performance.

== Plot ==
Tim (Taylor Kitsch) and Lyla (Minka Kelly) accompany Buddy (Brad Leland) to the airport, picking up Lyla's siblings as they prepare to go on a camping trip. That night, Eric (Kyle Chandler) and Tami (Connie Britton) dine with the McCoys, although Eric shares his discomfort with the McCoy's treatment of J.D. (Jeremy Sumpter).

Tami talks with Jamarcus Hall (Sinqua Walls), Dillon's starting fullback, after he gets himself in trouble for setting a classmate's hair on fire. She meets with his parents to warn him about a possible suspension, but the parents are surprised to discover that Jamarcus was part of the team. She tells Eric that Jamarcus was removed off the team, upsetting him as he has no fullback ready for the next game. He visits Jamarcus' family to make them consider changing their minds, finding that they are not interested in football and that they are constantly moving. Eric convinces them in watching the next game to see their son's potential.

With the house finally remodelated, Jason (Scott Porter) decides that they should sell the house themselves instead of contacting a real estate agent. However, Tim, Herc (Kevin Rankin), and Billy (Derek Phillips) are astonished at the $295,000 price tag, as it is higher than they initially agreed. They throw an open house, but they struggle in finding buyers interested in the property. When Billy and Herc express frustration, Jason finally admits that he needs the project to work in order to send money to Noah, and they decide to continue helping him.

Landry (Jesse Plemons) still thinks of Tyra (Adrianne Palicki), so Devin (Stephanie Hunt) decides to cheer him up by singing in the piano. When she leaves, she kisses Landry in the head. Realizing his crush on her, Landry decides to ask her out. However, Devin turns him down, revealing that she is lesbian, disappointing him. He talks with Tami, feeling that he is turning women away from him. Tami comforts him, stating that he will eventually find the right woman with his college career. During the camping trip, Buddy's children express their displeasure with Buddy and preference to Kevin, their new stepfather, prompting an upset Buddy to walk away. Lyla picks him, assuring him that he is loved.

Before the Panthers game, Jason meets with Dillon's former quarterback, who is visiting with his agent. The agent gives Jason a card, offering him a chance for a sports agent job in New York if he is interested. During the first half, J.D. disappoints by failing to complete passes, prompting Joe (D. W. Moffett) to scold him until Eric takes him out. For the second half, Eric instructs J.D. to call all plays, deviating from his father's playbook. This results in a win for Dillon, although Joe leaves by the time it is over. Billy then shows a video he compiled of Tim's football career to attract recruitment, which includes Eric and Billy himself expressing admiration for Tim. Jason talks with Lyla over the job offer, and Lyla deduces he is leaving. Lyla praises Jason, telling him she understands and supports his decision.

== Production ==
=== Development ===
In November 2008, DirecTV announced that the seventh episode of the season would be titled "It Ain't Easy Being J.D. McCoy". The episode was written by Brent Fletcher, and directed by Chris Eyre. This was Fletcher's first writing credit, and Eyre's first directing credit.

== Reception ==
=== Viewers ===
In its original American broadcast on NBC, "Keeping Up Appearances" was seen by an estimated 4.22 million household viewers with a 1.5/5 in the 18–49 demographics. This means that 1.5 percent of all households with televisions watched the episode, while 5 percent of all of those watching television at the time of the broadcast watched it. This was a 7% increase in viewership from the previous episode, which was watched by an estimated 3.93 million household viewers with a 1.4/4 in the 18–49 demographics.

=== Critical reviews ===
"Keeping Up Appearances" received positive reviews from critics. Eric Goldman of IGN gave the episode a "great" 8.8 out of 10 and wrote, "This episode had a good storyline for Landry and Jesse Plemons was great here, showing the insta-crush Landry developed the moment Devin kissed him on the side of the head – and the fact that he couldn't see that it was awkward for her when he kissed her."

Keith Phipps of The A.V. Club gave the episode a "B" grade and wrote, "So, all in all, another episode that, like last week's, feels relatively minor but filled with some typically fine moments. But unlike last week's this one relied on self-contained sub-plots that felt a little too neat. We're now in the back half of this shortened season, however, so I expect the momentum to pick up quickly. Call this halftime."

Alan Sepinwall wrote, "Okay, that's two duds in seven episodes overall, and two out of the last three. Still a much better batting average than season two, but other than Street and Herc's fight in the backyard, and Scott Porter's performance in general, I found almost no redeeming qualities in this one, where at least I found about half of "Every Rose Has Its Thorn" to be good." Todd Martens of Los Angeles Times wrote, "The final six episodes of Friday Night Lights seem to be setting a great conflict among J.D., the coach and Joe. Here's hoping Katie has a part to play in it."

Erin Fox of TV Guide wrote, "She realizes he's moving away, and he asks Lyla if she thinks he'll make a great sports agent. She does, and it's a very moving scene between two characters — that are most likely thinking about the life they were supposed to live together — that we've come to love. Tears." Jonathan Pacheco of Slant Magazine wrote, "Despite having some of the more interesting situations and developments of the season, 'Keeping Up Appearances' contains way too much filler to be effective. And it was all just so darn cutesy that I began to cringe after every 'aww, how sweet' moment."

Daniel Fienberg of Zap2it wrote, "So how did Friday Night Lights carry over that momentum? By delivering a new episode without a single second of Saracen and with Julie appearing only in a single shot at a football game, almost a cruel joke." Television Without Pity gave the episode an "A–" grade.

Brent Fletcher submitted this episode for consideration for Outstanding Writing for a Drama Series at the 61st Primetime Emmy Awards.
