= Game of the Week (Friday Night Lights) =

- Friday Night Lights episode
- Episode no.: Season 3 Episode 9
- Directed by: Michael Waxman
- Written by: David Hudgins
- Cinematography by: Todd McMullen
- Editing by: Ron Rosen
- Original release dates: December 3, 2008 (DirecTV); March 13, 2009 (NBC)
- Running time: 43 minutes

Guest appearances
- Kim Dickens as Shelby Saracen; Jeremy Sumpter as J.D. McCoy; D. W. Moffett as Joe McCoy; Janine Turner as Katie McCoy; Brad Leland as Buddy Garrity; Zach Roerig as Cash Waller

Episode chronology
← Previous "New York, New York"	Next → "The Giving Tree"
- Friday Night Lights (season 3)

"Game of the Week" is the ninth episode of the third season of the American sports drama television series Friday Night Lights, inspired by the 1990 nonfiction book by H. G. Bissinger. It is the 46th overall episode of the series and was written by co-executive producer David Hudgins, and directed by co-producer Michael Waxman. It originally aired on DirecTV's 101 Network on December 3, 2008, before airing on NBC on March 13, 2009.

The series is set in the fictional town of Dillon, a small, close-knit community in rural West Texas. It follows a high school football team, the Dillon Panthers. It features a set of characters, primarily connected to Coach Eric Taylor, his wife Tami, and their daughter Julie. In the episode, Tim is given an offer while learning bad news about Billy. Meanwhile, Matt struggles with his grandmother, and Tyra has second thoughts on her life with Cash.

According to Nielsen Media Research, the episode was seen by an estimated 4.40 million household viewers and gained a 1.5/5 ratings share among adults aged 18–49. The episode received positive reviews from critics, who praised the performances and character development, although some criticized Tyra's subplot.

== Plot ==
Tim (Taylor Kitsch) returns to Dillon, finding that Billy (Derek Phillips) crashed his truck. As Tim scolds him for his hangover, Billy reveals that his engagement with Mindy was called off. As the Panthers prepare for the regional playoffs against Arnett Mead, Buddy (Brad Leland) announces that their incoming game has been announced as the high school game of the week, which will be broadcast on national television.

Tyra (Adrianne Palicki) accompanies Cash (Zach Roerig) in his new rodeo in Dallas, where he is respected by the crowd. However, Cash actually owes money to another man and he promises that he will pay him with the first place finish. Cash ends up in second place, and is angry that his $2,000 prize is not enough to pay his debt. Tyra leaves her motel room after an argument and talks with Landry (Jesse Plemons), not having told him her real location. Landry asks her to return, as she must help with the incoming winter's formal as she must pick a theme as president of the student council. When Cash scolds her during a card game, Tyra decides to leave him.

Matt (Zach Gilford) gets into an argument with Lorraine (Louanne Stephens) as he states his plans in leaving for college. When Matt comes up with the idea that Shelby (Kim Dickens) can take care of her, Lorraine angrily dismisses it and insults Shelby, calling her the devil and prompting her to leave the house. Tim is contacted by a San Antonio State college representative for an interview, and he reluctantly agrees to go when Lyla (Minka Kelly) offers to take him. On the car ride, Tim downplays the importance of the interview, causing an upset Lyla to kick him out of the car before reaching his interview.

The Panthers struggle during the first half of the game, with Arnett Mead winning 7-3. Eric (Kyle Chandler) decides to put Matt into the game as a wide receiver, which causes Lorraine and Shelby to quickly attend the game. Thanks to Tim and Matt, the Panthers manage to win the game with 10-7 and moving forward in the playoffs. Eric then takes Tami (Connie Britton) to a hotel room for a romantic evening for her birthday. However, the evening is ruined when Tyra calls Tami, asking her to pick her up in Dallas. Tami leaves for Dallas, annoying Eric.

Lyla meets Mindy, finding that she dumped Billy after he asked her to quit her job at the strip club, even though he has not found a job. They decide to hang out at her house, where they talk badly about Tim and Billy. However, Billy arrives apologizing to Mindy and asks her to pardon him. To Lyla's disappointment, Mindy forgives him and they reconcile. Eric and Tami pick Tyra from Dallas, despite Cash's angry pleas. Tim visits Lyla, confirming that he met with the representative and he was enrolled in college, delighting her.

== Production ==
=== Development ===
In November 2008, DirecTV announced that the ninth episode of the season would be titled "Game of the Week". The episode was written by co-executive producer David Hudgins, and directed by co-producer Michael Waxman. This was Hudgins' eighth writing credit, and Waxman's third directing credit.

== Reception ==
=== Viewers ===
In its original American broadcast on NBC, "Game of the Week" was seen by an estimated 4.40 million household viewers with a 1.5/5 in the 18–49 demographics. This means that 1.5 percent of all households with televisions watched the episode, while 5 percent of all of those watching television at the time of the broadcast watched it. This was a 15% increase in viewership from the previous episode, which was watched by an estimated 3.80 million household viewers with a 1.2/4 in the 18–49 demographics.

=== Critical reviews ===
"Game of the Week" received positive reviews from critics. Eric Goldman of IGN gave the episode a "great" 8.5 out of 10 and wrote, "As much as I love both characters, and felt – in different ways – their exits were well handled, I'm kind of glad both Smash and Street are gone now from Friday Night Lights, only because the show had the burden of spending a specific amount of time wrapping up their storylines, and it seemed to be at the expense of some others. Specifically, it's hard not to notice that while this has been a very strong season, the ladies have been given the short end of the stick – Tyra's romance with Cash is probably the least engaging plotline, while Lyla has had almost nothing to do."

Keith Phipps of The A.V. Club gave the episode a "B" grade and wrote, "It felt like another solid outing in a season that's been solid with outbursts of greatness. Now that the playoffs are here, it might be time to kick things into high gear." Todd Martens of Los Angeles Times wrote, "If the episode started as one that was going to focus on more personal concerns, that's not how it ended. Episode No. 9 had the football game as its centerpiece, and, like earlier chapters this season, showed how the sporting life can break and mend hearts, wreck[sic] havoc and build a community - all within 44 or so minutes."

Alan Sepinwall wrote, "Really, it felt like just another game, which would have been fine if they hadn't introduced the cameras in the first place, or if we weren't so deep into an abbreviated season where every episode needs to count for more than they did in the old NBC-premiere days." Erin Fox of TV Guide wrote, "In a funny and sweet moment, Tim catches a whiff of Lyla's breath and asks her if she on a bender. Ha! He also says he almost got a buzz from the smell. Double ha!"

Jonathan Pacheco of Slant Magazine wrote, "Once again, in this transitional episode, we see one story end and the seeds for another story being planted. Now that Tyra has left Cash, her interests will inevitably turn back to Landry, especially after that phone call. I think it’s only a matter of time." Television Without Pity gave the episode a "B+" grade.
