= Jeffrey Reiner =

American film director

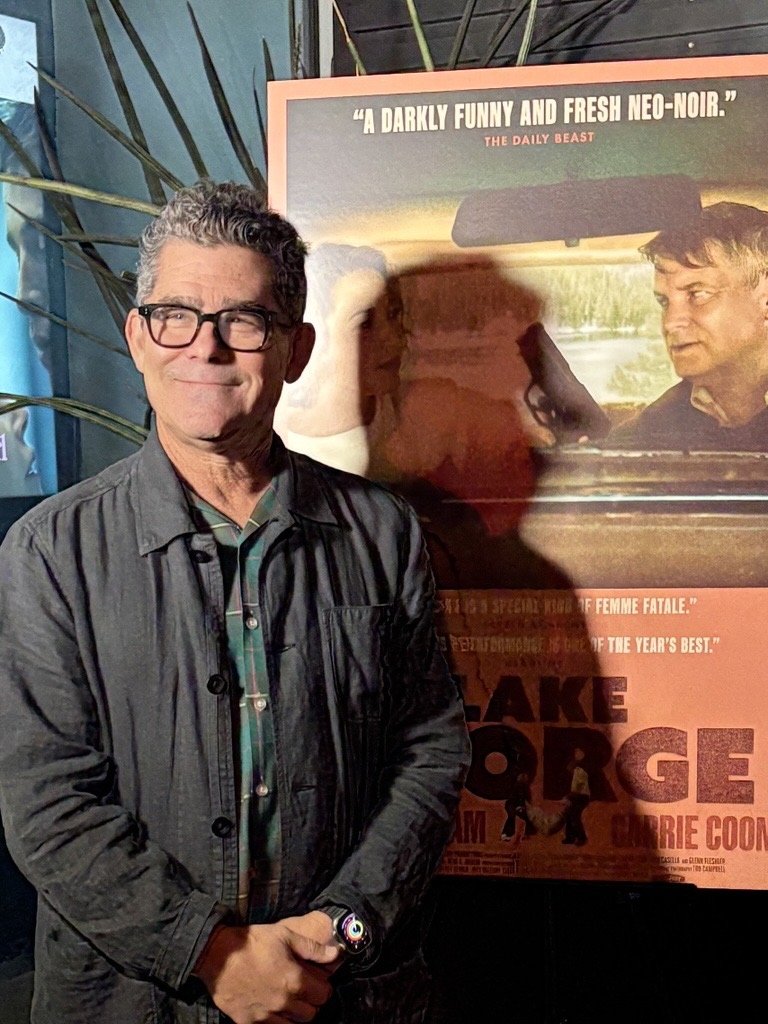
- Education: AFI Conservatory
- Occupation(s): Film and television director, editor, producer, screenwriter
- Years active: 1987–present

Jeffrey Reiner is an American film director, editor, screenwriter, television director, and producer.

== Career ==
Since the late 1980s, he has accumulated numerous credits in the film and television industry.

He began directing television and film during the 1990s. His directing and producing credits include Friday Night Lights, The Affair, High Fidelity, Dirty John, Fargo, Mighty Morphin Power Rangers, The Sentinel, Haunted, Columbo, The Division, Surface, Caprica, Trouble Bound, and Trauma.

He was executive producer and house director for the NBC series The Event under his deal with Universal Media Studios during the show's 2010–2011 run.

In 2011, Reiner was chosen to direct the pilot for a David E. Kelley-produced Wonder Woman television series for NBC. The pilot was ultimately not picked up for series.

Between 2014 and 2017, Reiner directed sixteen episodes of the television drama The Affair. The show subsequently won a Golden Globe for Best TV Series, Drama. Reiner departed The Affair after its third season.

In 2024, Reiner wrote and directed Lake George, starring Shea Whigham and Carrie Coon. He also wrote and directed Blood and Concrete in 1991.

He edited the films Cheerleader Camp, Think Big, 3 Ninjas Kick Back, and BASEketball.
