= Jason Katims =

American television writer, producer, and playwright

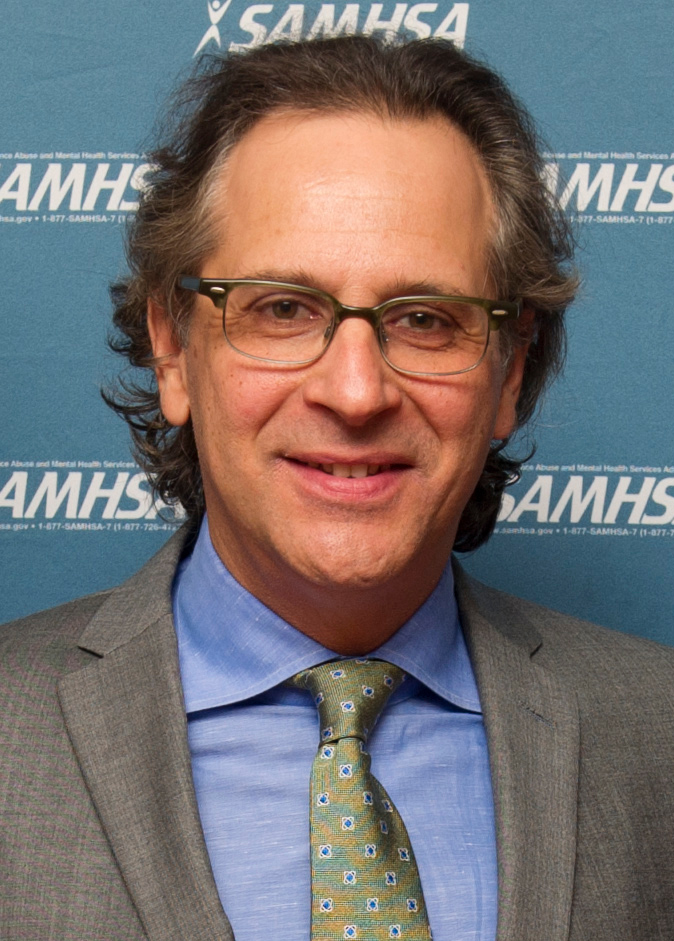
- Katims at the August 2014 Voice Awards
- Born: November 30, 1960 (age 65); New York City, New York, U.S.
- Education: Queens College
- Occupations: Producer, screenwriter, playwright
- Spouse: Kathy Katims
- Children: 2
- Writing career
- Notable works: Roswell; Friday Night Lights; Parenthood; About a Boy; Almost Family

Jason Katims (born November 30, 1960) is an American television writer, producer, and playwright. He is best known as the creator of several television series, including Relativity (1996), Roswell (1999–2002), Friday Night Lights (2006–2011), Parenthood (2010–2015), About a Boy (2014–2015) and Rise (2018).

== Early life and family ==
Jason Katims was born to a Jewish family in Brooklyn, New York City, New York, and raised first in Crown Heights and later in Midwood. His father Robert Katims was an actor and a salesman; his mother Ruth Sandra Ohsie, an English and philosophy major, "did some teachings". His parents were "very politically active, very left-leaning." He has an older brother and sister.

Before studying theater at Queens College in Queens, New York City, he graduated from Edward R. Murrow High School.

He married his high school sweetheart; they have two children, Phoebe and Sawyer Katims.

== Career ==
Katims was a playwright in New York until director and producer Ed Zwick asked him if he wanted to write for television and films.

In 1994, he wrote three episodes for the ABC teen drama My So-Called Life. He created Relativity in 1996 but the TV series was cancelled after 17 episodes. He subsequently created Roswell, which gained cult following.

Katims worked on the NBC series Friday Night Lights as head writer and executive producer. He was nominated for a Writers Guild of America Award for Best New Series at the February 2007 ceremony for his work on the first season of Friday Night Lights. He was nominated for the WGA Award for Best Dramatic Series the following year at the February 2008 ceremony for his work on the second season of Friday Night Lights. Katims was nominated for Best Dramatic Series a second time at the February 2009 ceremony for his work on the third season of Friday Night Lights. He was nominated for the WGA Award for Best Drama Series for the third consecutive year at the February 2010 ceremony for his work on the fourth season. In 2011, he was honored by an award for Outstanding Writing for a Drama Series in Friday Night Lights.

Katims is also the creator of and executive producer for another NBC series, Parenthood, based on the feature film of the same name and a short-lived TV series that followed; Katims' series debuted in 2010 and ended in 2015. Katims based that series' Max Braverman character on his life with his own son, who has Asperger syndrome.

Katims developed About a Boy, a 2014 TV series based on the novel of the same name, for NBC.

He has written a play, The Man Who Couldn't Dance and is a former member of Stagewrights, a playwriting collective in New York City.

Katims also developed Almost Family, a 2019 TV series based on the Australian series Sisters, for Fox.

On June 15, 2020, Katims is the writer of As We See It, based on Israeli series On the Spectrum for Amazon Prime Video.

More recently, he signed a multi-year overall deal with Imagine Television.

== Filmography ==
=== Film ===
- The Pallbearer (1996)
- The Vow (2012)

=== Television ===
The numbers in directing and writing credits refer to the number of episodes.

Title	Year	Credited as				Network	Notes
Title	Year	Creator	Director	Writer	Executive producer	Network	Notes
My So-Called Life	1994	No	No	Yes (3)	No	ABC	Story editor
Relativity	1996	No	No	Yes (7)	co-executive	ABC	Pilot writer
Roswell	1999–2002	Developer	No	Yes (17)	Yes	The WB	
DeMarco Affairs	2004	Yes	No	No	Yes	ABC	
Fertile Ground	2005	No	No	No	Yes	N/A	
Pepper Dennis	2006	No	No	Yes (2)	Yes	The WB	
The Wedding Bells	2007	Yes	No	Yes (1)	Yes	Fox	
Friday Night Lights	2006–2011	No	Yes (2)	Yes (10)	Yes	NBC; The 101 Network	
Parenthood	2010–2015	Developer	Yes (3)	Yes (21)	Yes	NBC	
About a Boy	2014–2015	Developer	No	Yes (6)	Yes	NBC	
The Path	2016	No	No	Yes (1)	Yes	NBC	
Pure Genius	2016–2017	Yes	No	Yes (3)	Yes	CBS	
Rise	2018	Developer	No	Yes (5)	Yes	NBC	
Almost Family	2019–2020	No	No	No	Yes (2)	Fox	
As We See It	2022	Developer	No	Yes (3)	Yes	Amazon Prime Video	
Dear Edward	2023	Yes	No	Yes	Yes	Apple TV+	
