= Dana Wheeler-Nicholson =

American actress (born 1960)

- Born: 1960 (age 65–66); New York City, U.S.
- Occupations: Actress, singer
- Years active: 1984–present
- Spouse: Alex Smith (2011–present)
- Relatives: Malcolm Wheeler-Nicholson (grandfather)

Dana Wheeler-Nicholson (born 1960) is an American actress and singer best known for her roles in the films Fletch (1985), Tombstone (1993), Fast Food Nation (2006) and Parkland (2013). She is also known for her roles on television series such as Friday Night Lights, Seinfeld and Nashville.

== Personal life ==
Wheeler-Nicholson was born in New York City, the daughter of Joan (née Weitemeyer) and Douglas Wheeler-Nicholson. She is the granddaughter of pioneering American comic book publisher Malcolm Wheeler-Nicholson, who founded DC Comics under the original company name National Allied Publications. Wheeler-Nicholson has been married to film director Alex Smith since 2011 and lives in Austin, Texas.

== Career ==
Sometimes credited as Dana Wheeler Nicholson, she has appeared in numerous feature films, but is perhaps best known for her role in Fletch (1985) as Gail Stanwyk, the love interest of the title character. She is well known for her performance in Tombstone (1993) as Mattie Earp. Wheeler-Nicholson has also appeared in the films Bye Bye Love (1995), Denise Calls Up (1995), Fast Food Nation (2006), and Parkland (2013).

On television, Wheeler-Nicholson has guest-starred in Seinfeld, Law & Order, Law & Order: Criminal Intent, The X-Files, Sex and the City, Boston Public, and Boston Legal. She starred in the short-lived comedy Beverly Hills Buntz from 1987 to 1988, and in 2001 was cast on the daytime soap opera All My Children. In the mid-2000s, Wheeler-Nicholson moved from Los Angeles to Austin, Texas. From 2007 to 2011, she had a recurring role in the television drama Friday Night Lights as Angela Collette. In 2014, Wheeler-Nicholson played the role of character Scarlett O'Connor's abusive mother on the musical drama series Nashville. In 2015, she had a supporting role in the independent drama film 6 Years.

== Filmography ==
=== Film ===
Year	Title	Role	Notes
1984	The Little Drummer Girl	Katrin	
1984	Mrs. Soffel	Jessie Bodyne	
1985	Fletch	Gail Stanwyk	
1990	Circuitry Man	Lori	
1993	My Life's in Turnaround	Rachel	
1993	The Night We Never Met	Inga	
1993	Tombstone	Mattie Blaylock Earp	
1995	Bye Bye Love	Heidi Schmidt	
1995	Frank and Jesse	Annie Ralston	
1995	Denise Calls Up	Gail Donelly	
1995	The Pompatus of Love	Kathryn	
1997	Nick and Jane	Jane Whitmore	
1997	Living in Peril	Linda Woods	
1997	Jamaica Beat	Lori Peterson	
2001	Sam the Man	Woman	
2001	What's the Worst That Could Happen?	Gallery Hostess	Uncredited
2003	The Battle of Shaker Heights	Mathilda Bowland	
2006	Fast Food Nation	Debi Anderson	
2010	Dance with the One	Mary	
2011	5 Time Champion	Danielle	
2011	Blacktino	Moon	
2011	Dadgum, Texas	Bettie Crawley Magee	
2013	Angels Sing	Maggie	
2013	Winter in the Blood	Malvina	
2013	Parkland	Lillian Zapruder	
2015	6 Years	Joanne Mercer	
2018	Miss Arizona	Maybelle	
2020	On the Line	Tricia Bisbee	

=== Television ===
Year	Title	Role	Notes
1986–87	Crime Story	Marilyn Stewart	2 episodes
1987	The Hitchhiker	Belinda Haskell	Episode: "Secret Ingredient"
1987–88	Beverly Hills Buntz	Rebecca Giswold	13 episodes
1991	N.Y.P.D. Mounted	Donna Lee Wellington	TV film
1991	Palace Guard	Apache	Episode: "Pilot"
1994	Fortune Hunter	Cristina	Episode: "The Frostfire Intercept"
1995	Seinfeld	Shelly	Episode: "The Doodle"
1996	The X-Files	Det. Angela White	Episode: "Syzygy"
1997	The Single Guy	Erika	Episode: "Like Father..."
1998	Sex and the City	Laney Berlin	Episode: "The Baby Shower"
2000	NYPD Blue	Jenny Peters	Episode: "The Man with Two Right Shoes"
2000	Law & Order	Maggie Callister	Episode: "Mega"
2001	Big Apple	Joan Kellogg	3 episodes
2001	All My Children	Ilene Pringle	9 episodes
2002	Without a Trace	Sarah Pritchard	Episode: "Midnight Sun"
2003	Boston Public	FBI Agent Monica Price	Episode: "Chapter Seventy-Four"
2005	Grounded for Life	Arianna	Episode: "Tom Sawyer"
2005	Boston Legal	Stephanie Rogers	Episode: "It Girls and Beyond"
2005	McBride: Anybody Here Murder Marty?	Victoria Caine	TV film
2006, 2008	Law & Order: Criminal Intent	Hilary Marsden, Tara Black	Episodes: "Slither", "Reunion"
2010	The Deep End	Judge Reyes	Episode: "White Lies, Black Ties"
2010	The Good Guys	Meredith	Episode: "Old Dogs"
2007–11	Friday Night Lights	Angela Collette	22 episodes
2012	A Gifted Man	Jayne Reinhart	Episode: "In Case of (Re)Birth"
2014–15	Nashville	Beverly O'Connor	12 episodes
2014	Law & Order: Special Victims Unit	Donna Evans	Episode: "Producers Backend"
2019	Chicago Med	Chicago Med	Episode: "Can't Unring That Bell"
2019	Emergence	Vanessa Cox	Episode: "American Chestnut"
2020	Grey's Anatomy	Dana Hamilton	Episode: "Sing It Again"
2021	Walker	Joy Caldwell	Episode: "Four Stones In Hand"
2022	Law & Order: Special Victims Unit	Lilah Jones	Episode: "Mirror Effect"
