= Eric Taylor (Friday Night Lights) =

Fictional character in TV series Friday Night Lights

- Friday Night Lights character
- Kyle Chandler as Eric Taylor
- First appearance: "Pilot"
- Last appearance: "Always"
- Portrayed by: Kyle Chandler

In-universe information
- Occupation: Head Coach of the Pemberton Pioneers; Former Head Coach of the East Dillon Lions; Former Quarterbacks' Coach of Texas Methodist University; Former Head Coach of the Dillon Panthers; Former Athletic Director of Dillon High School; Former Junior Varsity Head Coach of the Dillon Panthers; Former Quarterbacks' Coach of the Dillon Panthers
- Family: Shelley Hayes (sister-in-law); Matt Saracen (son-in-law)
- Spouse: Tami Taylor
- Children: Julie Taylor (daughter); Gracie Taylor (daughter)

Eric Taylor is a fictional character and the central protagonist in the NBC/DirecTV (The 101 Network) drama television series Friday Night Lights played by Kyle Chandler. He is introduced as the head coach of the Dillon High School football team, the Dillon Panthers. At the end of the first season, he accepts a position as the quarterback coach at the fictional Texas Methodist University (TMU), where he had served as an assistant coach. After the birth of his second daughter, he leaves TMU in the second season to return to Dillon and once again coach the Panthers. Following a conspiracy by Joe McCoy in season three, Taylor is replaced as Panthers' coach by Wade Aikmen, his assistant, and instead offered the chance to start a new football program at East Dillon High School after Dillon, Texas is redistricted. The character was positively received and was included on several best lists and earned Kyle Chandler a number of award nominations, notably winning an Emmy Award in 2011.

== Background ==
It is stated throughout the series that Coach Taylor grew up in Texas and played football as a young man. It is also hinted that he knew his wife, Tami, in high school and that they married fairly young.

Before becoming the head coach of the Dillon Panthers, he was the Quarterbacks coach, Junior High School, and Junior Varsity coach for 6 years. He was Jason Street's QB coach throughout Pop Warner, Junior High, and High School. Due to Jason's past success under Coach Taylor's tutelage, he was promoted to High School head coach prior to Jason's senior year.

== Characterization ==
As a coach, Taylor is firm but fair to his players and is against nepotism. It is thought he gained this characteristic while a protege to the great Enda, who Coach Taylor once stated "is a legend." This put him at odds with Joe McCoy, and ultimately led to his ousting and subsequent transfer to East Dillon High. He is held in high regard as a "molder of men" and greatly respected by his players, many of whom lacked a father figure or significant male role model in their lives and saw him as a surrogate father. As his former star quarterback, Jason Street, once says to him, "You [Taylor] will always be my coach". His high school counselor-turned-principal wife, Tami, often grouses about how the lines between football and academics at Dillon High are blurred and the fact that there is the perception that football players can get away with anything. Nonetheless, his strong sense of morality is seen a number of times, such as when he suspends Smash Williams for using steroids, personally apologizes to a student who was beaten up by one of his hot-headed defensive ends, Bobby Reyes, and does not hesitate to punish players for disobeying rules, whether on the field or off. He has a dislike for anything that distracts his players, and is actively opposed to media attention and the hype surrounding his team.

Taylor loves his family very much and is much more affectionate around his wife, contrasting with the brusque and "hard-ass" football coach image he maintains at practices and games. He and their daughter, Julie, are close but relations between them are strained for a while when she goes through a rebellious phase in season 2. Despite her dislike of football, Julie is often seen at games cheering her father on, and Taylor tries his best to relate to her, taking her to the father-daughter dance and playing table tennis in their garage. He is also unfailingly polite to other Dillon residents, often biting back his annoyance at their armchair coaching, and never forgets to address the elderly Lorraine Saracen as "ma'am."

== Storylines ==
=== Season 1 ===
During the pilot episode Taylor is introduced as the new Dillon Panthers head coach. It is likely that he has been at Dillon for some time since it is stated that he used to be a quarterbacks' coach prior to this promotion. His season starts disastrously when his star quarterback, Jason Street, is paralyzed as a result of a tackle gone wrong. Sophomore, Matt Saracen, manages to save the game, but Taylor is under immense pressure from everyone given Matt's status as a relative unknown and hardly-used talent. In addition, he has to deal with the overbearing booster club president, Buddy Garrity, who ambitiously recruits Ray "Voodoo" Tatum without consulting Taylor. Taylor eventually expels Tatum from the team for being disrespectful in the locker room (i.e. insubordination), and for failing to follow the playbook, costing the team an interception at a crucial juncture of a game. Despite a rough road into the playoffs, the Panthers end the season with a record of 12–2 and win the 2006 Texas High School State Championship, winning a thrilling final game by overcoming a 26–0 deficit, 27–26. Along with teammates, Brian "Smash" Williams and Tim Riggins, Saracen leads the Panthers to a victory in the state final over ex-Panther, Ray "Voodoo" Tatum's, new team, West Cambria.

=== Season 2 ===
Taylor decides to leave his position at TMU and rejoin the Panthers, after Buddy Garrity and the boosters fire his replacement due to frustration with the team's performance during the first two games, in which they posted a 1–1 record. After Taylor's return, the Panthers go on a prolonged winning streak, qualifying for the playoffs with an 8–2 record. However, their quest for a second consecutive state title falls short, as the Panthers lose in the state quarterfinal, ending the season with a 9–3 record.

=== Season 3 ===
Again, as in season 1, quarterback controversy surrounds the Panthers the entire year, with a conflict emerging between veteran, Matt Saracen, and young phenom, J.D. McCoy. The two share playing time for the first few games of the season, after which time Taylor decides to start McCoy and demote Saracen to second string. Determined to win back a starting role, Saracen, with the help of his girlfriend and coach's daughter, Julie Taylor, convinces Coach Taylor to give him a starting role as a wide receiver. Saracen plays well in his new role, and along with McCoy and Riggins, helps the Panthers post their strongest regular season under Coach Taylor, as they cruised into the playoffs with a 9–1 record. For the second time in three seasons, the Panthers reached the state final. However, McCoy breaks down mentally and the Panthers find themselves losing by a huge margin at halftime, again. Sensing McCoy's immaturity, Taylor decides to play Saracen at quarterback in the second half, in which Matt leads the Panthers to a tremendous comeback. However, poor time management causes the Panthers to relinquish their lead, as they fall in the final seconds of the state championship, 30–28. The Panthers end the season with a 12–2 mark.

=== Season 4 ===
West Dillon decides not to renew Coach Taylor's contract, as Joe McCoy's influence leads the boosters and the school board to select Wade Aikmen, J.D. McCoy's personal quarterback coach, as the new Panther Head Coach. Taylor's failure to comply with McCoy and Aikmen's demands and total control of offensive play calling and assurance that J.D. will start every game leads to his departure.

Taylor is selected to coach the new team at the newly re-opened East Dillon High School, where he has to start from scratch. He finds an unlikely ally in Buddy Garrity, who is disgusted by McCoy's behavior and manipulation. In the first game, the East Dillon Lions looked completely overmatched, trailing 45–0 at halftime, at which time Taylor decides to forfeit the game due mostly to his players' injuries. Taylor eventually apologizes for this decision, as it demoralizes his players and takes him several days to win back their respect.

After the first game, Buddy Garrity switches allegiances due to his frustration with Panther leadership, and alerts Coach Taylor to the real address of West Dillon star running back, Luke Cafferty, who must attend East Dillon due to his real address. During the season, under Taylor's tutelage, sophomore quarterback, Vince Howard, emerges as one of the state's best players. With Howard and the acquisition of Cafferty from West Dillon, the Lions end the season respectably, defeating West Dillon in the final game on a field goal by Landry Clarke. Although the Lions end the season with a poor 2–8 mark, Taylor, Howard, and Cafferty lay the foundation for the next year's championship team.

=== Season 5 ===
The Lions begin the season on a roll, winning their first seven games, including a blowout of crosstown rival West Dillon. During the season, under the influence of his father, Vince Howard becomes corrupted by the recruitment process, which causes the end of the Lions' winning streak. Vince's temporary selfishness forces Coach Taylor to bench him and start Cafferty at quarterback. In the meantime, Taylor is again courted by another college in Florida. Although the offense struggles when Howard is benched, Cafferty leads the Lions to a thrilling last second victory, in which they clinch a playoff berth.

Howard realizes his mistakes and grows into a mature leader toward the end of the season, leading the Lions to dominate throughout the playoffs and reach the state final. Howard throws a Hail Mary touchdown pass to clinch the state championship for the Lions at 27–26. Despite the state championship, budget cuts force the elimination of the Lions after the season, at which time the Lions' players will join the Panthers. Taylor receives an offer to return to the head coach position for the Dillon Panthers; he eventually declines due to past conflicts with the booster club. Taylor moves away from Dillon and begins coaching the Pemberton Pioneers in Philadelphia, due to a career opportunity for his wife, Tami.

== Coach Taylor's Record ==
As head coach of the Panthers for 3 seasons and Lions for 2, Eric Taylor compiled an impressive 43–16 record, including 4 playoff appearances, 3 state finals appearances, and 2 state championships. With the Panthers, Taylor compiled a record of 28–7, including 11–2 and 12–2 seasons; 2006 in which he won the state final and 2008 in which he reached the state final, respectively. With the Lions, Taylor compiled a record of 15–9, including a 13–1 mark in 2010, in which he won his second state title.

Team	Year	Regular season				Postseason			
Team	Year	Won	Lost	Ties	Win %	Won	Lost	Win %	Result
Dillon Panthers	2006	6	2	0	.750	5	0	100	Defeated West Cambria Mustangs in the State Title Game
Dillon Panthers	2007	4	2	0	.667	1	1	50	Lost to Arnett Mead Tigers in state quarterfinal
Dillon Panthers	2008	9	1	0	.900	3	1	75	Lost to South Texas Titans in the State Title Game
East Dillon Lions	2009	2	8	0	.200	–	–	–	–
East Dillon Lions	2010	8	1	0	.889	5	0	100	Defeated Hudgins Hawks in the State Title Game
Total		29	14	0	.674	14	2	.875	

== Reception ==
He was listed in MTV's Best TV Characters of 2011. AOL TV placed him in its Top 20 TV Dads. John Kubicek of BuddyTV listed him in his list of the "15 Hottest TV Dads", describing him as a "surrogate father to many of his players" and praising his will to relate to his daughter's life. Eric's relationship with Tami was included in AOL TV's list of the "Best TV Couples of All Time" and in the same list by TV Guide. Judy Berman of Flavorwire put the couple in her list of the best TV characters of 2011, explaining: "Friday Night Lights's Eric and Tami Taylor have often been called the most realistic depiction of a strong marriage on television, and we agree with that assessment. Deeply good people who are imperfect enough to never seem saccharine, they have major disagreements and relationship-changing conflicts but value each other and their marriage enough to work them out." For his portrayal, Kyle Chandler received several award nominations, winning notably one Primetime Emmy Award in 2011.
