= Jeremy Sumpter =

American actor (born 1989)

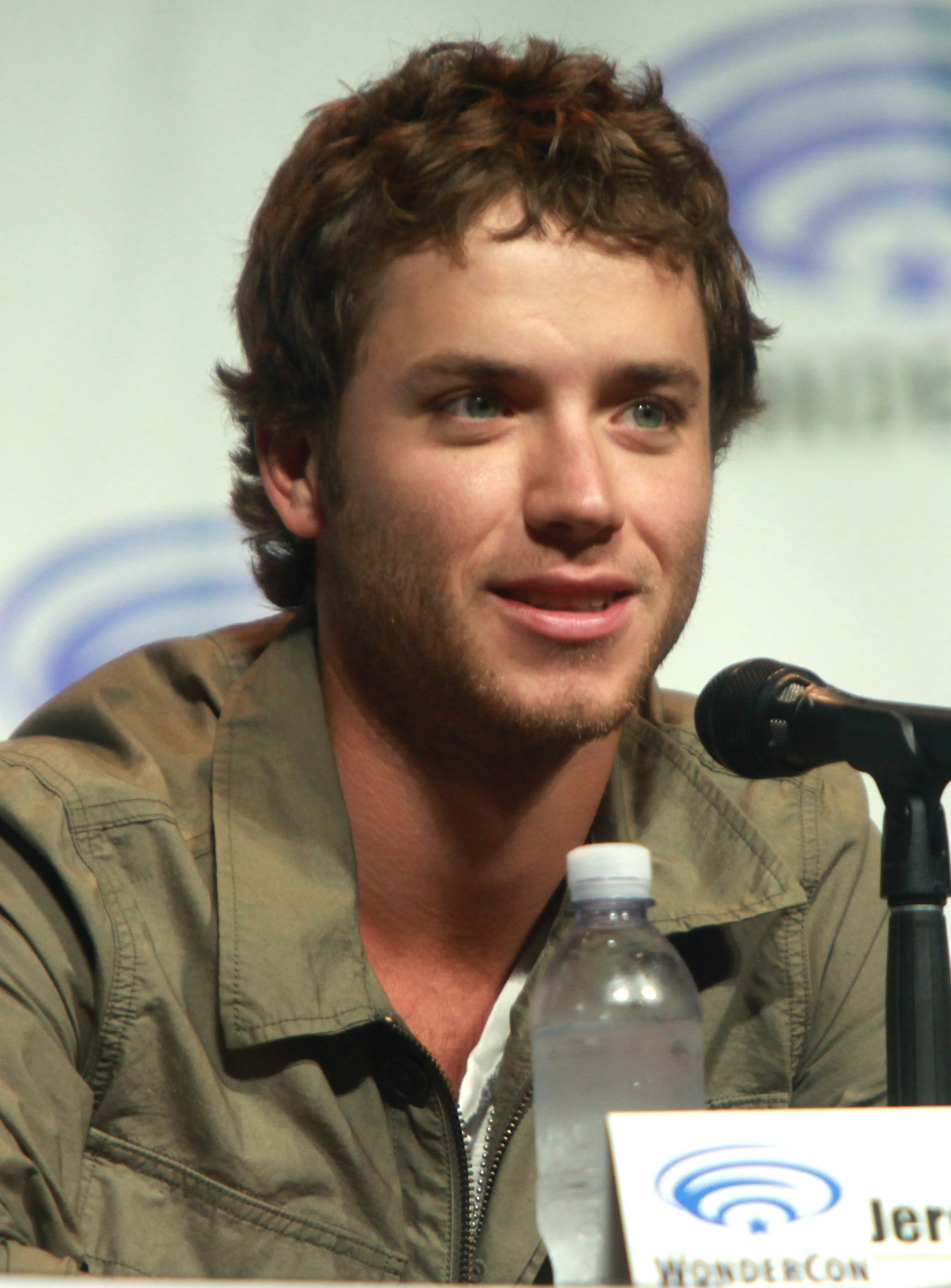
- Sumpter in 2014
- Born: Jeremy Robert Myron Sumpter; February 5, 1989 (age 37); Carmel-by-the-Sea, California, U.S.
- Occupation: Actor
- Years active: 2000–present
- Spouse: Elizabeth Treadway (m. 2022)
- Children: 1
- Website: jeremysumpter.com

Jeremy Robert Myron Sumpter (born February 5, 1989) is an American actor. His prominent roles include the title role in the 2003 fantasy adventure film Peter Pan, Jacob in the 2014 disaster film Into the Storm, and the recurring role of J. D. McCoy in the NBC television series Friday Night Lights (2008–2010).

== Early life ==
Sumpter was born in Carmel-by-the-Sea, California, to parents Sandy (née Johnson) and Gary Sumpter. He has a twin sister, Jessica, and two other siblings, Travis and Jennifer. His family moved to his mother's hometown, Mount Sterling, Kentucky, when he was ten months old.

== Career ==
When Sumpter was 11, he entered International Modeling and Talent Association and started his modeling in Kentucky. He also won Pre-Teen Male Model of the Year, where he signed with Mark Robert as his personal manager. Sumpter then decided to move to Los Angeles, California with his family and start acting afterwards.

Sumpter's first movie role was in the 2001 film Frailty as the young Adam Mieks seen in flashbacks. Sumpter received a Saturn Award nomination for "Best Performance by a Younger Actor" for his performance. Following that, he appeared with Danny Glover in the Showtime film Just a Dream, for which he received a Young Artist Award for "Best Performance in a TV Movie, Mini-Series or Special - Leading Young Actor". His next film was Local Boys, a family surfing drama, with Mark Harmon and Eric Christian Olsen.

In July 2002, at age 13, Sumpter became the first male child actor selected for a live action role of Peter Pan in the then-upcoming film adaptation. Sumpter did nearly all of his stunts for the film himself. To prepare, he says he practiced sword fighting as much as five hours a day, as well as training in gymnastics and lifting weights. While filming in Australia, he supplemented his training with cricket and surfing. While his film casting significantly increased the realism of the fantasy story, Sumpter grew several inches during the film's production. This required staging tricks to retain Captain Hook's height advantage over Peter in face-to-face scenes late in the process. Producer Lucy Fisher also said that, "The window he flies out of had to be enlarged twice." Despite the film's box office failure, Sumpter has won both a Saturn and Young Artist Award for the film.

In the fall of 2004, Sumpter starred in the TV series Clubhouse as a boy who gets his dream job of working as a batboy for a New York City major league baseball team. The series was canceled by CBS after five episodes; all 11 episodes made have since been broadcast on cable/satellite channels. He then starred in Cyber Seduction: His Secret Life, a Lifetime Channel movie about a popular teenager whose life is ruined by an addiction to internet pornography.

Sumpter spent the summer of 2005 in Oregon filming the teen comedy The Sasquatch Gang (a.k.a. The Sasquatch Dumpling Gang), released in November 2006. He had a small role in the film An American Crime, which played on Showtime in 2008 before going to DVD. He appeared in an episode of CSI: Miami as the boyfriend of a girl whose parents are murdered.

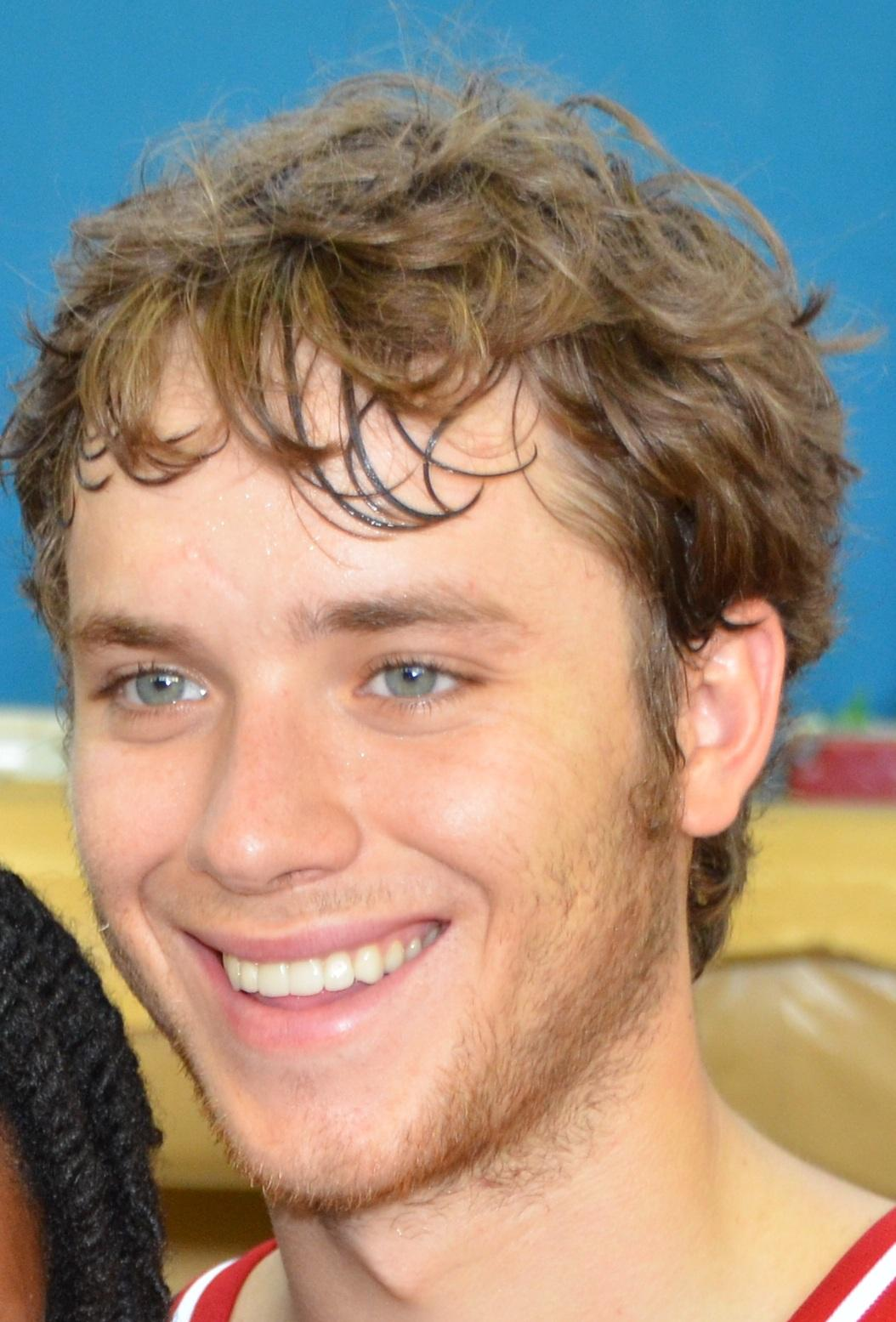
Sumpter in 2011

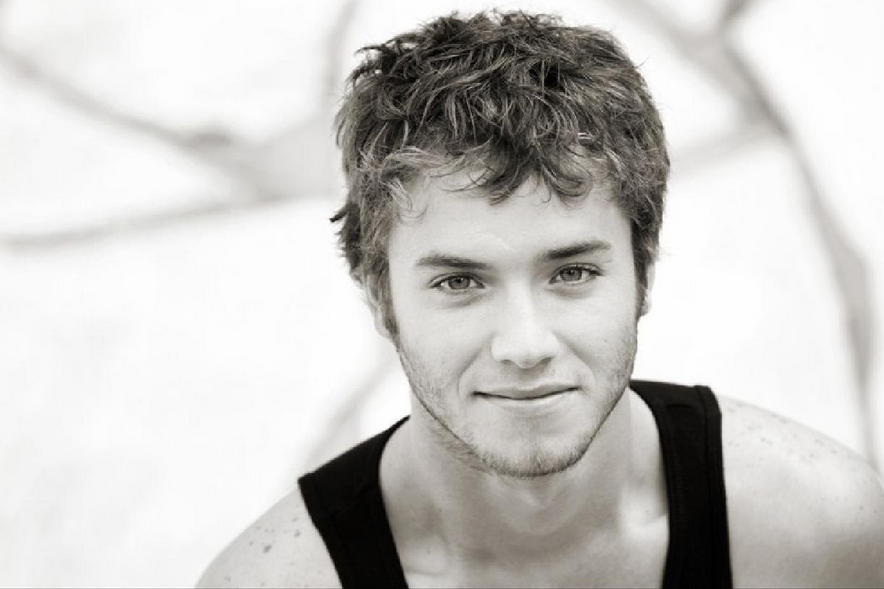
Sumpter in 2013

Sumpter completed filming roles in the coming-of-age comedy Calvin Marshall, Soul Surfer and Death and Cremation. He appeared in the meteorological disaster film Into the Storm as Jacob Hodges, a young cameraman for the stormchasers.

== Personal life ==
During filming for Peter Pan, Sumpter briefly shared a childhood crush with co-star Rachel Hurd-Wood. In December 2015, Sumpter announced that he and Lauren Pacheco were engaged to be married, but in October 2016 stated that they were no longer engaged. On October 1, 2022, Sumpter married Elizabeth Treadway in a ceremony in Columbia, Tennessee. Sumpter announced on December 25, 2022, via Instagram that he and Treadway are expecting a baby girl. On April 17, 2023, Sumpter announced that Treadway had given birth to their daughter.

== Filmography ==
=== Film ===
Year	Title	Role	Notes
2001	Frailty	Young Adam Meiks	
2002	Local Boys	Skeet Dobson	
2003	Peter Pan	Peter Pan	
2006	The Sasquatch Gang	Gavin Gore	
2007	An American Crime	Coy Hubbard	
2009	Calvin Marshall	Caselli	
2010	Death and Cremation	Jarod Leary	
2010	You're So Cupid	Connor Miller	
2011	Soul Surfer	Byron Blanchard	
2012	Excision	Adam	
2012	Hiding	Brett	Direct-to-video
2012	The UnBroken	Colt	
2014	Animal	Matt	
2014	Into the Storm	Jacob Hodges	
2015	The Culling	Tyler	
2015	The Squeeze	Augie	
2016	Billionaire Ransom	Kyle Hartmann	
2019	The Legend of 5 Mile Cave	Young Sam 'Shooter' Green	
2019	Stakeout	Ray Brey	
2022	Holiday Harmony	Jeremy	
2024	Chapel	Cohen Black / Ethan	
2024	The Fall	Travis Humphrey	

=== Television ===
Year	Title	Role	Notes
2001	Raising Dad	Henry	Episode: "The New Room"
2001	Murphy's Dozen	Sean	TV film
2001	ER	Nathan	Episode: "I'll Be Home for Christmas"
2002	Strong Medicine	Randy	Episode: "Discharged"
2002	Just a Dream	Henry Sturbuck	TV film
2004–2005	Clubhouse	Pete Young	Lead role
2005	Cyber Seduction: His Secret Life	Justin Petersen	TV film
2007	CSI: Miami	Zach Griffith	Episode: "Broken Home"
2008–2010	Friday Night Lights	J.D. McCoy	Recurring; seasons 3–4
2012	The Glades	Dane Westing	Episode: "Endless Summer"
2015	Stitchers	Devon / Gavin	Episode: "When Darkness Falls"
2016	Sisters of the Groom	Jason Quinn	TV film

== Awards ==
Awards
Year	Award	Category	Work	Result
2000	IMTA Award	Pre-Teen Male Model of the Year	–	Won
2003	Young Artist Award	Best Performance in a TV Movie, Mini-series or Special - Leading Young Actor	Just a Dream	Won
2003	Saturn Award	Best Performance by a Younger Actor	Frailty	Nominated
2004	Young Artist Award	Best Performance in a Feature Film - Leading Young Actor	Peter Pan	Won
2004	Saturn Award	Best Performance by a Younger Actor	Peter Pan	Won
2004	Phoenix Film Critics Society Award	Best Performance by a Youth in a Lead or Supporting Role - Male	Peter Pan	Nominated
2006	Young Artist Award	Best Performance in a TV Movie, Mini-series or Special (Comedy or Drama) - Leading Young Actor	Cyber Seduction: His Secret Life	Nominated
2009	Change The World Award	Youth for Humanity Award, Male	–	Honored
