= State (Friday Night Lights) =

- Friday Night Lights episode
- Episode no.: Season 1 Episode 22
- Directed by: Jeffrey Reiner
- Written by: Jason Katims; Patrick Massett; John Zinman
- Cinematography by: David Boyd
- Editing by: Stephen Michael; Angela M. Catanzaro
- Original release date: April 11, 2007
- Running time: 43 minutes

Guest appearances
- Dana Wheeler-Nicholson as Angela Collette; Brooke Langton as Jackie Miller; Aldis Hodge as Ray "Voodoo" Tatum; Brad Leland as Buddy Garrity; Jae Head as Bo Miller

Episode chronology
← Previous "Best Laid Plans"	Next → "Last Days of Summer"
- Friday Night Lights (season 1)

"State" is the 22nd episode and season finale of the first season of the American sports drama television series Friday Night Lights, inspired by the 1990 nonfiction book by H. G. Bissinger. The episode was written by executive producer Jason Katims and consulting producers Patrick Massett and John Zinman, and directed by co-executive producer Jeffrey Reiner. It originally aired on NBC on April 11, 2007.

The series is set in the fictional town of Dillon, a small, close-knit community in rural West Texas. It follows a high school football team, the Dillon Panthers. It features a set of characters, primarily connected to Coach Eric Taylor, his wife Tami, and their daughter Julie. In the episode, the Panthers prepare for their final game and win the State Championship.

According to Nielsen Media Research, the episode was seen by an estimated 6.26 million household viewers and gained a 2.2 ratings share among adults aged 18–49. The episode received universal acclaim from critics, who praised the closure to the season, tone and performances.

== Plot ==
Dillon is celebrating the Panthers as they prepare to leave for their State Championship game in Dallas and face the West Cambria Mustangs. During this, Tami (Connie Britton) goes to a clinic for a pregnancy test. When she relates how she and Eric (Kyle Chandler) have been trying for over a decade in having another baby, she is delighted when she is told that she is pregnant.

Eric is annoyed when Julie (Aimee Teegarden) tells Matt (Zach Gilford) about the TMU offer. Despite their relationship being over, Tim (Taylor Kitsch) gives tickets to Jackie (Brooke Langton) and Bo (Jae Head) if they want to see it. Tyra (Adrianne Palicki) invites Landry (Jesse Plemons) to join her on a car ride to Dallas. He is delighted in spending time with her, until he finds that she has invited her family to come along. On the way to Dallas, they notice Lyla (Minka Kelly) near the road after her car broke down. Tyra and Lyla have a heated argument in which they finally express their reasons behind their mutual disdain, but they reconcile and leave together for Dallas.

The Panthers arrive at Texas Stadium, which was leased for the game. They start practing just as the Mustangs arrive, with Voodoo (Aldis Hodge) leading them as the quarterback. However, tensions arise when Eric is questioned in the press about a possible TMU offer, with him finally confirming that he accepted it. Players like Matt and Tim are disappointed with the news, but others like Smash (Gaius Charles) support his decision. As he talks with Tami at their hotel room, Eric finally learns of her pregnancy and is overjoyed.

During the game, the Panthers have an awful start as Matt fails to make a single completion, which results in the Mustangs going 26-0 by halftime. At the locker room, Eric motivates the Panthers by not letting people write them off and to do it for everyone who loves them and came to see them. During the second half, the Panthers comeback by scoring 21 points. Despite getting a dislocated shoulder, Smash refuses to be benched and continues playing. With only six seconds left, Matt uses a trick play in order to mislead the Mustangs and passes the ball to Riggins who laterals it to Smash. Despite being tackled, Smash manages to reach the end zone, and the Panthers win the championship.

That night, Eric tells Tami that he wants to be present for his child and that he will stay in Dillon. They then argue, as Tami says she does not want to dampen his dream of taking the job. Back in Dillon, the Panthers have a parade to celebrate their victory. As Eric returns to his office, he overhears Jason (Scott Porter) speaking to the team about their upncoming season. Eric enters the room, where he is met with applause.

== Production ==
=== Development ===
In March 2007, NBC announced that the 22nd episode of the season would be titled "State". The episode was written by executive producer Jason Katims and consulting producers Patrick Massett and John Zinman, and directed by co-executive producer Jeffrey Reiner. This was Katims' fourth writing credit, Massett's third writing, Zinman's third writing credit, and Reiner's eighth directing credit.

== Reception ==
=== Viewers ===
In its original American broadcast, "State" was seen by an estimated 6.26 million household viewers with a 2.2 in the 18–49 demographics. This means that 2.2 percent of all households with televisions watched the episode. It finished 62nd out of 99 programs airing from April 9–15, 2007. This was a 17% increase in viewership from the previous episode, which was watched by an estimated 5.33 million household viewers with a 1.9 in the 18–49 demographics.

=== Critical reviews ===
"State" received universal acclaim from critics. Eric Goldman of IGN gave the episode an "amazing" 9 out of 10 and wrote, "Clear eyes, full hearts, can't lose. The battle cry for the Dillon Panthers was more powerful then ever on the season finale of Friday Night Lights, as the team finally had their climatic state championship game."

Sonia Saraiya of The A.V. Club gave the episode an "A" grade and wrote, "Bittersweet. Always, bittersweet. And insofar as this show is about Coach Taylor — who is, most often, our window into this community that is new to him — it is, fittingly, the most bittersweet for him. You can see it in the bemusement on his face when they do win. And now, this is happening."

Alan Sepinwall wrote, "Maybe if they had taken the time over the season to establish a single defensive player, we could have gotten excited about him knocking Voodoo all over the field, but as it was, he was getting hit by the extras. The rest of the episode, though, was fantastic, if overstuffed, as the producers tried to give closure to every character, again just in case this is it." Leah Friedman of TV Guide wrote, "So, do as Street said and have a great day. Enjoy it while it lasts. The Panthers won State. Soak it in."

Brett Love of TV Squad wrote, "This was a nice way to wrap things up. I couldn't be happier about the way this season played out. With the Panthers winning, the Taylor's plans squared away, and all of our other characters ready to move on, I'm giving this one 5 out of 7." Television Without Pity gave the episode an "A+" grade.
