= Mud Bowl (Friday Night Lights) =

- Friday Night Lights episode
- Episode no.: Season 1 Episode 20
- Directed by: David Boyd
- Written by: Elizabeth Heldens; David Hudgins
- Cinematography by: Todd McMullen
- Editing by: Joshua Butler
- Original release date: March 28, 2007
- Running time: 43 minutes

Guest appearances
- Brooke Langton as Jackie Miller; Kevin Rankin as Herc; Aasha Davis as Waverly Grady; Brad Leland as Buddy Garrity; Jae Head as Bo Miller

Episode chronology
| ← Previous "Ch-Ch-Ch-Ch-Changes" | Next → "Best Laid Plans" |
- Friday Night Lights (season 1)

"Mud Bowl" is the twentieth episode of the first season of the American sports drama television series Friday Night Lights, inspired by the 1990 nonfiction book by H. G. Bissinger. The episode was written by co-executive producer Elizabeth Heldens and supervising producer David Hudgins, and directed by David Boyd. It originally aired on NBC on March 28, 2007.

The series is set in the fictional town of Dillon, a small, close-knit community in rural West Texas. It follows a high school football team, the Dillon Panthers. It features a set of characters, primarily connected to Coach Eric Taylor, his wife Tami, and their daughter Julie. In the episode, the Panthers are forced to relocate to a new stadium after a train derailment, while Landry decides to tutor Tyra in order to get close to her.

According to Nielsen Media Research, the episode was seen by an estimated 5.68 million household viewers and gained a 2.0 ratings share among adults aged 18–49. The episode received universal acclaim from critics, who praised the writing, directing, performances, and tone, with many considering it one of the best episodes of the series.

== Plot ==
The Panthers prepare to face the Brant Vikings at the state semi-finals. However, a train derailment near the school forces a school evacuation due to a possible toxic waste hazard. This worries Eric (Kyle Chandler), as the semi-finals game was supposed to be in the Panthers' field. Eric is forced to relocate the team to a park in order to train, but is dismayed when he is informed that the school will be closed for one week, preventing Dillon from hosting the game.

Eric tries to look for a replacement, but refuses a larger stadium as it is closer to their competitors. While arguing with Buddy (Brad Leland) on the car, Eric becomes fascinated by an open field with cows. Tami (Connie Britton) has her reservations over his plan in turning the field into their new "stadium", but eventually recognizes that her husband really wants to make it. Eric has the team and other community members in helping build the new field, which is officially recognized as fitting to play. During this, in an attempt to get closer to her, Landry (Jesse Plemons) convinces Tyra (Adrianne Palicki) in becoming her algebra tutor.

Lyla (Minka Kelly) starts spending time with Waverly (Aasha Davis), who decides to take her to a shooting range. When Lyla tells Smash (Gaius Charles) about their visit, Smash reveals Waverly's bipolar diagnosis. Quickly deducing that Smash told her, Waverly confronts Smash. Smash explains that he supports her, but could not endanger people when she is refusing to take her medication, causing her to break down. Lyla also has a heated argument with Jason (Scott Porter) when the latter does not open up about his problems. During the lawsuit settlement meeting, Jason confronts his parents for trying to ruin people's lives for their debts. He decides to just get a settlement that covers the house payment, which is approved by the lawyers and supported by Eric.

The game is affected by a heavy rain, causing the players to slip through mud in the field. As they go tied by halftime, the referee considers suspending the game, but the teams express their interest in continuing playing. With a few seconds left, Matt (Zach Gilford) runs all the way to the end zone, scoring a touchdown and taking the Panthers to the finals. Noting Matt's improved tactic, Eric thanks Jason for guiding him and asks if he is interested in coaching. Landry schedules to meet with Tyra at the Alamo Freeze, but his car breaks down and is unable to arrive in time. When Tyra starts leaving, a man she met suddenly attacks her and tries to rape her in her car. She fights back and escapes, while the attacker flees. Landry finally arrives, and she embraces him.

== Production ==
=== Development ===
In March 2007, NBC announced that the twentieth episode of the season would be titled "Mud Bowl". The episode was written by co-executive producer Elizabeth Heldens and supervising producer David Hudgins, and directed by David Boyd. This was Heldens' fourth writing credit, Hudgins' third writing credit, and Boyd's second directing credit.

== Reception ==
=== Viewers ===
In its original American broadcast, "Mud Bowl" was seen by an estimated 5.68 million household viewers with a 2.0 in the 18–49 demographics. This means that 2.0 percent of all households with televisions watched the episode. It finished 65th out of 101 programs airing from March 26-April 1, 2007. This was a 5% increase in viewership from the previous episode, which was watched by an estimated 5.39 million household viewers with a 1.9 in the 18–49 demographics.

=== Critical reviews ===
"Mud Bowl" received universal acclaim from critics. Eric Goldman of IGN gave the episode a perfect "masterpiece" 10 out of 10 and wrote, "One of the most cinematic and intense episodes yet, 'Mud Bowl' once more showed the power of this show to take the potentially cheesy and make it shine."

Sonia Saraiya of The A.V. Club gave the episode an "A" grade and wrote, "'Mud Bowl' is probably the most perfect episode that Friday Night Lights ever attempted. Not the best, necessarily, though it is pretty damn amazing. But 'Mud Bowl' is sort of the whole vision of Friday Night Lights, crystallized into one 42-minute ride."

Alan Sepinwall wrote, "I don't know that I'd go so far as is as Dan Fienberg in calling it the best episode since the pilot, if only because of a little thing I like to call The Talk from 'I Think We Should Have Sex,' but on the sports side of the ledger, this was as good as this show gets." Leah Friedman of TV Guide wrote, "It seems that we so rarely get to see the Panthers actually compete, but those games really serve to anchor their respective episodes. In the past they've embodied our characters' feelings of suspense and disappointment, but this week it was all about control."

Brett Love of TV Squad wrote, "I'd still call this a very good episode. Another win for the Panthers and all the dominoes lined up for the big push to the end of the season." Television Without Pity gave the episode an "A" grade.

Adrianne Palicki submitted this episode for consideration for Outstanding Supporting Actress in a Drama Series at the 59th Primetime Emmy Awards.
