= Friday Night Lights season 1 =

Friday Night Lights
- Season 1
- Season 1 DVD cover
- No. of episodes: 22

Release
- Original network: NBC
- Original release: October 3, 2006 – April 11, 2007

Season chronology
- Next → Season 2

The first season of the American serial drama television series Friday Night Lights commenced airing in the United States and Canada on October 3, 2006, and concluded its 22-episode season on April 11, 2007, on NBC. The series revolves around the Dillon Panthers and their new head coach Eric Taylor as they deal with the pressure of high school football in Texas and everything that comes with it, on and off the field.

The first 10 episodes aired Tuesdays at 8:00 pm in the United States. When the show returned from the Christmas hiatus, it aired Wednesdays at 8:00 pm for the rest of its season. The season was released on DVD as a five disc boxed set on August 28, 2007, in the United States and Canada, and October 29, 2007, in the United Kingdom.

== Crew ==
The season was produced by NBC Universal Television, Imagine Television, and Film 44 and was aired on NBC in the United States. The executive producers were developer Peter Berg, Sarah Aubrey, David Nevins, Brian Grazer, and Jason Katims, with Jeffrey Reiner, and John Cameron serving as co-executive producers. Writers included Berg, Katims, producers David Hudgins and Bridget Carpenter, consulting producers Kerry Ehrin, Patrick Massett, and John Zinman, supervising producers Carter Harris and Elizabeth Heldens, and Andy Miller and Aaron Rahsaan Thomas. Katims served as showrunner. Regular directors throughout the season include Reiner, Allison Liddi-Brown, Stephen Kay, and David Boyd. Theme song music was composed by W. G. Snuffy Walden. Songs from Explosions in the Sky were also used throughout the season.

== Cast ==
In the initial season, 10 major roles received star billing in the opening credits. Kyle Chandler portrayed Eric Taylor, new head coach of the Dillon Panthers. Connie Britton played Tami Taylor, Eric's wife and new guidance counselor at Dillon High School. Gaius Charles played Brian "Smash" Williams, the cocky running back and star of the team. Zach Gilford played second-string quarterback Matt Saracen. Minka Kelly played Lyla Garrity, head cheerleader and girlfriend of the first-string quarterback Jason Street, played by Scott Porter. Taylor Kitsch portrayed Tim Riggins, fullback, resident bad boy, and best friend of Street's. Adrianne Palicki played Riggins' girlfriend and resident bad girl Tyra Collette. Jesse Plemons played Landry Clarke, Saracen's best friend. Aimee Teegarden played Julie Taylor, daughter of Eric and Tami's.

Supporting characters given expanded appearances throughout the season include: Brad Leland as Lyla's father and head of the Dillon Panthers' Booster Club Buddy Garrity, Derek Phillips as Tim's brother Billy Riggins, Louanne Stephens as Saracen's grandmother Lorraine Saracen, Liz Mikel as Smash's mother Corrina Williams, Kevin Rankin as Herc, and Jae Head as Bo Miller.

== Fictional game results ==
| Opponent | Result | Score | Record | Episode No. | Episode |
Regular season
| Westerby Chaps | Win | 27–24 | 1–0 | 1 | "Pilot" |
| South Milbank Rattlers | Loss | 7–13 | 1–1 | 3 | "Wind Sprints" |
| Arnett Mead Tigers | Forfeited Loss^{[a]} | 22-21 | 1–2^{[a]} | 5 | "Git'er Done" |
| Laribee Lions | Win | 28–17 | 2–2 | 7 | "Homecoming" |
| Gatling Eagles | Win | 6–2 | 3–2 | 9 | "Full Hearts" |
| Houston Area Timberwolves | Win | N/A^{[b]} | 4–2 | 10 | "It's Different for Girls" |
| Westcott Warriors | Win | 28–24 | 5–2 | 11 | "Nevermind" |
| South Pines Tigers | Win | 7–0^{[c]} | 6–2 | 13 | "Little Girl I Wanna Marry You" |
Regional playoffs
| McNulty Mavericks | Win | 30–10 | 7–2 | 15 | "Blinders" |
| Dunston Valley Cardinals | Win | 40-24, Forfeit^{[d]} | 8–2 | 16 | "Black Eyes and Broken Hearts" |
State quarterfinals
| Royal Rock Dragons | Win | 26–21 | 9–2 | 18 | "Extended Families" |
State semifinals
| Brant Vikings | Win | 14–8^{[e]} | 10–2 | 20 | "Mud Bowl" |
State championship
| West Cambria Mustangs | Win | 27–26 | 11–2 | 22 | "State" |

^{a} The game, won by Dillon 22-21 on the field, was subsequently forfeited because quarterback "Voodoo" Tatum was ruled ineligible for not having satisfied residency requirements.
^{b} Final score not revealed, though a TV newscast indicates the game was a lopsided win with Brian "Smash" Williams scoring 3 touchdowns.
^{c} Final score not shown, but Dillon scored a touchdown with about five minutes left in scoreless game.
^{d} The referees at Dunston were allowing the home team to commit infractions such as facemasks, late hits, and pass interference without penalties. When Dillon scored in the fourth quarter to take a commanding 40–24 lead, a Cardinal hit Smash after he scored the touchdown, again with no penalty call. Riggins rushed to Smash's defense, and a melee ensued before the extra point could be attempted. The game was called at that point, and Dillon was awarded the victory.
^{e} The game was played at a makeshift field due to a toxic train car derailment.

== Episodes ==
| No. overall | No. in season | Title | Directed by | Written by | Original release date | U.S. viewers (millions) |
|---|---|---|---|---|---|---|
| 1 | 1 | "Pilot" | Peter Berg | Peter Berg | October 3, 2006 | 7.17 |
The first episode tells the story of new coach Eric Taylor, who finds himself coaching high school football in Dillon, a small Texas town with a deep tradition of winning. However, the first football game of the season harbors dark tidings for star quarterback Jason Street.
| 2 | 2 | "Eyes Wide Open" | Jeffrey Reiner | Jason Katims | October 10, 2006 | 5.87 |
As the town turns to faith and prayer to deal with star quarterback Jason Street's serious injury, Coach Taylor turns to an untested backup quarterback, Matt Saracen, to anchor the team. Meanwhile, tensions reach the boiling point between teammates Tim Riggins and Brian "Smash" Williams, and Jason's girlfriend, Lyla Garrity, provides support to her fallen boyfriend.
| 3 | 3 | "Wind Sprints" | Jeffrey Reiner | Elizabeth Heldens | October 17, 2006 | 6.55 |
When the Panthers are out of sync without Street, in a game against underdog South Millbank, Coach Taylor is subjected to the wrath of the community, the media, and the players' parents. As team morale plummets, he must resort to drastic measures to unite his players to teach them that one person doesn't make the team, it's all the players that make the team, in order to save his season, and maybe his career. Meanwhile, Coach Taylor is pressured to recruit a new quarterback to replace Matt, and Jason and Lyla get into a fight.
| 4 | 4 | "Who's Your Daddy" | Allison Liddi-Brown | Kerry Ehrin | October 24, 2006 | 6.27 |
The Panthers prepare for a fierce battle against their archrival, Arnett Meade. When their field house is vandalized, apparently by Arnett Meade students, the team plots retaliation. Meanwhile, cool and intimidating new quarterback, Ray "Voodoo" Tatum, showcases his athletic prowess, Jason gets an obnoxious new roommate at the hospital, and Coach Taylor hosts the traditional team dinner at his house.
| 5 | 5 | "Git'er Done" | Mark Piznarski | Patrick Massett & John Zinman | October 30, 2006 | 8.26 |
As the town and team anticipate a big Friday night game against Arnett Meade, Coach Taylor weighs heavily whether to start Matt or Voodoo. But what happens when Ray Voodoo Tatum isn't exactly the type of team leader Dillon is looking for? Meanwhile, sparks fly between Tyra and a young businessman from Los Angeles, Jason begins rehabilitation exercises, and Lyla's secret relationship with Tim begins to sizzle.
| 6 | 6 | "El Accidente" | Dan Lerner | Carter Harris | November 7, 2006 | 5.94 |
Pressure mounts over the Texas High School Athletic Administration's investigation into whether Dillon illegally recruited Voodoo. Meanwhile, player Bobby Reyes brutally assaults one of Matt's brainy buddies, and Tim and Lyla spring the injured Jason out of the hospital for a surprise field trip.
| 7 | 7 | "Homecoming" | Patrick Norris | David Hudgins | November 14, 2006 | 5.48 |
Homecoming at Dillon brings back a throng of alumni, including the quarterback from the 2000 state champions, Lucas Mize, who harbors dark secrets. Meanwhile, Tyra and Billy, Tim's brother, plan a killer postgame party, Smash focuses on impressing a college recruiting expert, Tim tries to quit drinking, and Jason grows more suspicious of Lyla's relationship with Tim.
| 8 | 8 | "Crossing the Line" | Jeffrey Reiner | Bridget Carpenter | November 28, 2006 | 6.18 |
Disheartened by his ineffective performance on the field, Smash resorts to drastic measures to strengthen his game. Along the way, he takes a job at the Alamo Freeze, working alongside Matt. Meanwhile, Tim and Tyra rekindle their dormant relationship, Jason prepares to participate in a rugby scrimmage for paraplegics, and Julie contemplates going out with Matt.
| 9 | 9 | "Full Hearts" | Josh Pate | Aaron Rahsaan Thomas | December 5, 2006 | 6.13 |
Tension escalates as the Panthers anticipate a game with highly touted Gatling High which has special meaning for Smash. Tami and Buddy negotiate with Gatling boosters for an acceptable hotel for the visiting Panthers. Meanwhile, rumors spread about Lyla and Tim's forbidden relationship, Smash continues to go to extremes to strengthen his gridiron performance, and Julie and Matt's first date is plagued with problems.
| 10 | 10 | "It's Different for Girls" | Stephen Kay | Andy Miller | December 12, 2006 | 5.66 |
The Dillon cheerleading squad preps for a championship as rumors spread about Lyla's forbidden affair with Tim, causing Lyla to fall victim to merciless harassment. Meanwhile, Coach Taylor stands in the way of his daughter's budding relationship with Matt, Jason adapts to life at home, and Smash inches closer to the preacher's daughter.
| 11 | 11 | "Nevermind" | Jonas Pate | Elizabeth Heldens | January 3, 2007 | 6.28 |
Matt's father makes a surprise return visit from Iraq for two weeks, only to emerge as a man far removed from the heroic figure Matt remembered. Meanwhile, Jason and Lyla begin to rekindle their relationship, and Landry tutors an academically challenged Tim.
| 12 | 12 | "What to Do While You're Waiting" | David Boyd | Kerry Ehrin | January 10, 2007 | 6.41 |
During a bye week, the Panthers' seasonal destiny rests on the outcome of the Buckley vs Arnett Mead game. Meanwhile, Matt's father, far removed from the violence in Iraq, adapts to life at home, the Streets continue to push for a lawsuit against Coach Taylor, and Tyra deals with her mother's dysfunctional relationship with her boyfriend.
| 13 | 13 | "Little Girl I Wanna Marry You" | Jeffrey Reiner | Jason Katims | January 24, 2007 | 5.66 |
Tension builds as the Panthers find the playoffs only one game away. Off-field dramas continue when Smash's mother makes a discovery that could destroy her son's gridiron dreams. Meanwhile, Tyra confronts her mom's insecurities, and Jason ruminates on his relationship with Lyla.
| 14 | 14 | "Upping the Ante" | Allison Liddi-Brown | David Hudgins | January 31, 2007 | 6.73 |
The Panthers' postseason destiny becomes clearer as they play a crucial game. Meanwhile, Coach Taylor deals with Smash's personal demons, a mismatched Tyra and Julie connect in an unexpected friendship, Tim reunites with his estranged father, and Buddy makes a discovery about Jason and Lyla.
| 15 | 15 | "Blinders" | Stephen Kay | Bridget Carpenter & Carter Harris | February 7, 2007 | 6.41 |
The Panthers savor their crucial playoff win—until race issues emerge and sorely test their bond. Elsewhere, Tami frowns upon Julie's newfound friendship with Tyra, the Riggins brothers adapt to life with their recently returned father, and the girls play a game of powder-puff football. With Julie at quarterback, and Tyra as linebacker, all bets are off.
| 16 | 16 | "Black Eyes and Broken Hearts" | Jeffrey Reiner | Patrick Massett & John Zinman | February 14, 2007 | 7.43 |
Racial tensions are at an all-time high as the black players on the Dillon Panthers won't play unless Mac McGill is fired for his comments, forcing Coach Taylor to dip into the JV roster. Also Coach Taylor deliberates between firing one of his best coaches and succumbing to his players' demands, Julie's friendship with Tyra becomes more and more destructive. And even when they come together and all the players play, the team comes against biased referees and Smash has to keep his cool when he finds himself deliberately targeted by the opposition. Meanwhile, Jason makes a life-changing decision and Matt does whatever he can to win Julie back.
| 17 | 17 | "I Think We Should Have Sex" | Allison Liddi-Brown | Elizabeth Heldens | February 21, 2007 | 5.16 |
The Panthers claw their way deeper into the playoffs. Off the field, Julie shocks Matt by telling him that they should make love—but numerous fumbles ensue when Matt works to find the right time and place for the special moment. Meanwhile, Tim's relationship with his father begins to shatter; and Street bonds with a pretty tattoo artist.
| 18 | 18 | "Extended Families" | Charles Stone | Kerry Ehrin | February 28, 2007 | 5.07 |
The Panthers make a push for the state semifinals; a banished Buddy moves in with the Taylors after his affair is exposed; Waverly uncharacteristically takes Smash on a sexy midnight swim, and Smash discovers that she has stopped taking her mood-disorder medication; and Riggins and a neighborhood boy strike up a friendship.
| 19 | 19 | "Ch-Ch-Ch-Ch-Changes" | Jeffrey Reiner | Jason Katims | March 21, 2007 | 5.39 |
With TMU knocking on Coach Taylor's door, Julie decides to make it very clear to her parents that she does not intend to move away from Dillon and Matt. Meanwhile, Jason gets some devastating news from the quad rugby recruiters in Austin. Elsewhere, Riggins befriends a single mother and her son.
| 20 | 20 | "Mud Bowl" | David Boyd | Elizabeth Heldens & David Hudgins | March 28, 2007 | 5.68 |
With the final game before the state championships looming, an unforeseen event jeopardizes the Panthers' home-turf advantage. Meanwhile, Taylor fears his players are losing grasp of the true spirit of football, so he tries to instill in them a love of the game.
| 21 | 21 | "Best Laid Plans" | Jeffrey Reiner | Kerry Ehrin & Carter Harris | April 4, 2007 | 5.33 |
Coach Taylor contemplates taking a position at Texas Methodist University and makes a rash decision that could turn his family topsy-turvy. As the Panthers gear up for the State Championship game, Tyra's secret is finally revealed. With tension off the field reaching a boiling point, everything comes to a head at the annual Panther Roast. Meanwhile, Jason Street plays a major role in helping Matt Saracen prepare for the state championship.
| 22 | 22 | "State" | Jeffrey Reiner | Jason Katims & Patrick Massett & John Zinman | April 11, 2007 | 6.26 |
In the Season 1 finale, the Panthers gear up for the state championship, and prepare to take on their old teammate; Ray "Voodoo" Tatum. Also rumors swell about whether or not Coach Taylor will accept a job at Texas Methodist University, much to the dismay of everyone in Dillon. Meanwhile, Tami receives some surprising news 10 years in the making.

== Reception ==
=== Critical response ===
On Rotten Tomatoes, the season has an approval rating of 94% with an average score of 8.3 out of 10 based on 32 reviews. The website's critical consensus reads, "Innovative for its time, Friday Night Lights offers a realistic glimpse into small-town life and the social issues that accompany it." On the review aggregator website Metacritic, the first season scored 78 out of 100, based on 32 reviews, indicating "generally favorable" reviews.

Several critics lauded the series: Virginia Hefferna of The New York Times called it "A fiercely controlled and inventive work of art"; Troy Patterson of Slate named it "The most engrossing new drama of the fall season"; and Tom Shales of The Washington Post said it is "Extraordinary in just about every conceivable way". Robert Bianco of USA Today praised the series' "rare ability to portray life in small-town America without being condescending or sentimental", and Henry Goldblatt of Entertainment Weekly applauded the series' cinematography, setting, and subject matter, saying: "Lights doesn't look a whole lot like anything else on television right now."

=== Accolades ===
For the 59th Primetime Emmy Awards, Peter Berg was nominated for Outstanding Directing for a Drama Series for "Pilot" and the series won for Outstanding Casting for a Drama Series. For the 23rd TCA Awards, the series won for Outstanding New Program of the Year and received nominations for Outstanding Achievement in Drama, Program of the Year, and Individual Achievement in Drama (Connie Britton and Kyle Chandler).
