= Ch-Ch-Ch-Ch-Changes =

- Friday Night Lights episode
- Episode no.: Season 1 Episode 19
- Directed by: Jeffrey Reiner
- Written by: Jason Katims
- Cinematography by: Todd McMullen
- Editing by: Stephen Michael
- Original release date: March 21, 2007
- Running time: 43 minutes

Guest appearances
- Brooke Langton as Jackie Miller; Dana Wheeler-Nicholson as Angela Collette; Alexandra Holden as Suzy; Kevin Rankin as Herc; Aasha Davis as Waverly Grady; Brad Leland as Buddy Garrity; Jae Head as Bo Miller

Episode chronology
← Previous "Extended Families"	Next → "Mud Bowl"
- Friday Night Lights (season 1)

"Ch-Ch-Ch-Ch-Changes" is the nineteenth episode of the first season of the American sports drama television series Friday Night Lights, inspired by the 1990 nonfiction book by H. G. Bissinger. The episode was written by executive producer Jason Katims and directed by co-executive producer Jeffrey Reiner. It originally aired on NBC on March 21, 2007.

The series is set in the fictional town of Dillon, a small, close-knit community in rural West Texas. It follows a high school football team, the Dillon Panthers. It features a set of characters, primarily connected to Coach Eric Taylor, his wife Tami, and their daughter Julie. In the episode, Eric debates on his new job offer, while Jason receives heartbreaking news, and Tim continues befriending his neighbors.

According to Nielsen Media Research, the episode was seen by an estimated 5.39 million household viewers and gained a 1.9 ratings share among adults aged 18–49. The episode received extremely positive reviews from critics, who praised the performances and character development.

== Plot ==
Eric (Kyle Chandler) and Tami (Connie Britton) debate over the recent TMU offer, Julie (Aimee Teegarden) makes it clear that she will not move to Austin if Eric accepts the job. In Austin, Jason (Scott Porter) concludes his training camp time with a game, but is heartbroken when he is told that he was not selected to join the team for the 2008 Summer Paralympics.

Tim (Taylor Kitsch) is asked by Jackie (Brooke Langton), to pick up Bo (Jae Head) from school as she needs to work on a later shift. However, Tim arrives just as four kids are bullying Bo, and scares them away. Seeing that Bo lacks fighting experience, Tim decides to teach him how to defend himself, despite Jackie's protests. She decides to invite him to watch Back to the Future that night, where he takes a sleeping Bo to bed. As Jackie thanks him, Tim suddenly kisses her. However, she scolds him as he is just a "kid", causing him to leave in embarrassment. Meanwhile, Tami tutors Tyra (Adrianne Palicki), as she is worried about her education. However, Angela (Dana Wheeler-Nicholson) tells Tyra that she won't make it to Texas Tech University.

Suzy (Alexandra Holden) gives Jason a ride to Dillon, but they decide to stop by Stonehenge II. As they talk, they share a kiss. When Lyla (Minka Kelly) visits him at home, she questions if anything happened between them. When Jason reiterates nothing happened, Lyla quickly suspects they kissed. When she asks if he still wants their engagement to continue, Jason hesitates. To complicate matters, her mother is refusing to let Buddy (Brad Leland) back in the house. When Lyla defends his mistake, her mother reveals that Buddy previously had affairs, causing a devastated Lyla to kick him out. That night, Tim takes Jason to the field to drink beer with Matt (Zach Gilford) and Smash (Gaius Charles) and discuss their "girl problems", with Smash revealing that Waverly (Aasha Davis) was diagnosed with bipolar disorder. Jason then coaches Matt with new quarterback tactics.

Julie reluctantly accompanies Eric to a father-daughter dance, intending to dance only once with him due to his plans in moving out. Before the dance, Eric tells her that while she cannot influence his decision, he admits she deserves more respect and independence. Julie then states that while she moved through her life, Dillon felt like her actual home for the first time. At Buddy's dealership, Lyla rams some of his cars before crashing her car through the offices. The following morning, Tim apologizes to Jackie, who kisses him back. Eric tells Tami and Julie that he informed TMU that he needed time to decide on the offer.

== Production ==
=== Development ===
In March 2007, NBC announced that the nineteenth episode of the season would be titled "Ch-Ch-Ch-Ch-Changes". The episode was written by executive producer Jason Katims, and directed by co-executive producer Jeffrey Reiner. This was Katims' third writing credit, and Reiner's sixth directing credit.

== Reception ==
=== Viewers ===
In its original American broadcast, "Ch-Ch-Ch-Ch-Changes" was seen by an estimated 5.39 million household viewers with a 1.9 in the 18–49 demographics. This means that 1.9 percent of all households with televisions watched the episode. It finished 67th out of 97 programs airing from March 19–25, 2007. This was a 6% increase in viewership from the previous episode, which was watched by an estimated 5.07 million household viewers with a 1.8 in the 18–49 demographics.

=== Critical reviews ===
"Ch-Ch-Ch-Ch-Changes" received extremely positive reviews from critics. Eric Goldman of IGN gave the episode a "great" 8.7 out of 10 and wrote, "What makes Friday Night Lights work so well is that the characters are so well formed, that even when you can see a storyline coming, it feels earned and inevitable, because we understand so much why it's occurring."

Sonia Saraiya of The A.V. Club gave the episode a "B" grade and wrote, "Generally, Friday Night Lights gets the family dynamics of the Taylors down perfectly, and this episode is rich with moments that are both hilarious and tragic, like the show itself. Their interactions with Buddy and with the Collettes underscore how functional and happy and loving they are, even when they’re fighting."

Alan Sepinwall wrote, "while this one wasn't quite as epic, it was another beautiful Taylor family tale. Kyle Chandler's specialty has been the hard-ass, sarcastic side of Coach, and he got to show a compellingly softer side here, especially in the scene where Tami suggests that Julie is really in love with Matt... about three seconds before Julie walks in looking extremely grown-up, and it finally hits him that his daughter is becoming a woman worthy of more respect and consideration." Leah Friedman of TV Guide wrote, "I'm more worried, though, about what's going to happen with Buddy. His 'To tell you the truth, Lyla, I've got no reason to live without my family,' was not encouraging, and as truly obnoxious as his character has been in the past, the writers have done an admirable job of fleshing him out to be someone that we must sympathize with."

Brett Love of TV Squad wrote, "It wasn't a huge installment of our story, but there was a lot of good stuff to be had in there. It sets the stage nicely for the final three episodes that will decide the fate of the Panthers, and the show." Television Without Pity gave the episode a "B+" grade.
