= Black Eyes and Broken Hearts =

- Friday Night Lights episode
- Episode no.: Season 1 Episode 16
- Directed by: Jeffrey Reiner
- Written by: Patrick Massett; John Zinman
- Cinematography by: David Boyd
- Editing by: Angela M. Catanzaro; Stephen Michael
- Original release date: February 14, 2007
- Running time: 43 minutes

Guest appearances
- Brett Cullen as Walt Riggins; Kevin Rankin as Herc; Aasha Davis as Waverly Grady; Brad Leland as Buddy Garrity

Episode chronology
← Previous "Blinders"	Next → "I Think We Should Have Sex"
- Friday Night Lights (season 1)

"Black Eyes and Broken Hearts" is the sixteenth episode of the first season of the American sports drama television series Friday Night Lights, inspired by the 1990 nonfiction book by H. G. Bissinger. The episode was written by consulting producer Patrick Massett and John Zinman, and directed by co-executive producer Jeffrey Reiner. It originally aired on NBC on February 14, 2007.

The series is set in the fictional town of Dillon, a small, close-knit community in rural West Texas. It follows a high school football team, the Dillon Panthers. It features a set of characters, primarily connected to Coach Eric Taylor, his wife Tami, and their daughter Julie. In the episode, Smash leads part of the players into a protest in order to get Mac fired, while Matt tries to repair his relationship with Julie.

According to Nielsen Media Research, the episode was seen by an estimated 7.43 million household viewers and gained a 2.6 ratings share among adults aged 18–49. The episode received near critical acclaim, with critics praising the subject matter and performances, although some were divided over the resolution to Mac and Smash's storyline.

== Plot ==
Smash (Gaius Charles) talks to the press, expressing how 25% of the Panthers roster walked out in protest. When asked about a solution, he states that Mac (Blue Deckert) should be fired for his comments. Due to losing pivotal players, Eric (Kyle Chandler) is forced to use the JV team and assigns Tim (Taylor Kitsch) to lead them.

Julie (Aimee Teegarden) continues hanging out with Tyra (Adrianne Palicki), despite her parents' objections. During a day out, Tyra takes Julie to the strip club to get some money from her sister. There, Matt (Zach Gilford) and Landry (Jesse Plemons) appear, with Matt trying to give Julie a necklace as an apology while Landry unsuccessfully tries to flirt with Tyra. Seduced by the strippers, Landry gets some money as tip to watch them dance, only to be approached by an undercover police officer. Matt, Landry, Julie and Tyra are arrested and subsequently bailed out by their parents. Eric (Kyle Chandler) and Tami (Connie Britton) ground Julie and prohibit her from seeing Tyra again.

With the incoming playoff game relying on the availability of the players, Eric must decide what to do with Mac's situation as Buddy (Brad Leland) is pushing for Mac's firing. That night, Mac visits Eric at home. He opens up about his family background in Arkansas, including living under a father who opposed the integration of Little Rock Central High School. Mac says that he does not want the team to lose it all for his actions, and hands Eric his resignation letter. However, Eric tells the press that Mac will stay with the team. Smash also faces a dilemma as the players' future heavily depends on their football career, including his own. He talks with his mother, who tells him that he shouldn't let people like Mac end his future.

On the day of the game against the Dunston Valley Cardinals, Smash and the rest of the players show up to leave, ending the protest. However, Smash tells Mac that this will not change anything, as he now sees him for who he truly is. The game proves to be a challenge for the Panthers, as the Cardinals use dirty tactics, including late hits and facemask pulls. When a Cardinal player delivers a late hit on Smash and calls him a racial slur, Tim punches the player, causing a brawl in the field and ending the game early. After reviewing, the board grants Dillon the win but Eric admonishes the team for their actions. However, on the way back to Dillon, they are stopped by two police officers. The officers want to take Smash into custody, citing that he committed aggravated assault. Mac refuses to let them arrest him without a warrant, prompting the officers to leave. As they return to Dillon, Smash asks Mac about the officers, to which he replies "They made a mistake, son. Just like me." At the field, Matt gives the necklace to Julie, asking her to be his girlfriend, which she accepts.

== Production ==
=== Development ===
In January 2007, NBC announced that the sixteenth episode of the season would be titled "Black Eyes and Broken Hearts". The episode was written by consulting producer Patrick Massett and John Zinman, and directed by co-executive producer Jeffrey Reiner. This was Massett's second writing credit, Zinman's second writing credit, and Reiner's fifth directing credit.

== Reception ==
=== Viewers ===
In its original American broadcast, "Black Eyes and Broken Hearts" was seen by an estimated 7.43 million household viewers with a 2.6 in the 18–49 demographics. This means that 2.6 percent of all households with televisions watched the episode. It finished 58th out of 104 programs airing from February 12–18, 2007. This was a 15% increase in viewership from the previous episode, which was watched by an estimated 6.41 million household viewers with a 2.3 in the 18–49 demographics.

=== Critical reviews ===
"Black Eyes and Broken Hearts" received near critical acclaim. Eric Goldman of IGN gave the episode a "great" 8 out of 10 and wrote, "A lot was on the line as Friday Night Lights picked up this week. With the next playoff game coming up, the decision by Smash and the other black members of the Panthers to boycott the team due to Mac's racially charged statements couldn't have come at a worse time, as far the Panthers chances of winning were concerned."

Sonia Saraiya of The A.V. Club gave the episode an "A" grade and wrote, "It's here where Friday Night Lights offers a moment of pure transcendental hope in the universe — the quiet stand of Mac McGill, assistant coach, government employee, casual racist. Because if the kids are terrified, and Coach Taylor is frustrated, Mac is exactly one thing they're not—knowing. He knows these guys. He knows what they're thinking. He knows this game. He's played it himself. And maybe the world is split up into good guys and bad guys, and only the bad guys say awful racist things. But sometimes, you need a bad guy on your side."

Alan Sepinwall wrote, "Rich wants to give the show the benefit of the doubt and assume that Smash and Mac's relationship will be an ongoing subject, but it looked from this seat like they put a bow on the whole thing. Still, if there's any network show right now that deserves some benefit of the doubt, it's Friday Night Lights." Leah Friedman of TV Guide wrote, "Let's just be glad the Panthers are going forward, even if it was only because under league rules, three quarters can be counted as a full game. Hey, we don't make the rules, we just follow them. We'll follow them all the way to State."

Brett Love of TV Squad wrote, "After where we left off last week, it was pretty clear what direction we would be heading this week. Where we would end up, that was the mystery. The resolution to the 'Blinders' cliff-hanger wasn't all that was on the agenda though. And as good as it was, it wasn't even my favorite part of the episode." Television Without Pity gave the episode an "A–" grade.
