= Extended Families (Friday Night Lights) =

- Friday Night Lights episode
- Episode no.: Season 1 Episode 18
- Directed by: Charles Stone
- Written by: Kerry Ehrin
- Cinematography by: David Boyd
- Editing by: Angela M. Catanzaro; Scott Gamzon
- Original release date: February 28, 2007
- Running time: 43 minutes

Guest appearances
- Brooke Langton as Jackie Miller; Dana Wheeler-Nicholson as Angela Collette; Kevin Rankin as Herc; Alexandra Holden as Suzy; Aasha Davis as Waverly Grady; Brad Leland as Buddy Garrity; Jae Head as Bo Miller

Episode chronology
← Previous "I Think We Should Have Sex"	Next → "Ch-Ch-Ch-Ch-Changes"
- Friday Night Lights (season 1)

"Extended Families" is the eighteenth episode of the first season of the American sports drama television series Friday Night Lights, inspired by the 1990 nonfiction book by H. G. Bissinger. The episode was written by consulting producer Kerry Ehrin and directed by Charles Stone. It originally aired on NBC on February 28, 2007.

The series is set in the fictional town of Dillon, a small, close-knit community in rural West Texas. It follows a high school football team, the Dillon Panthers. It features a set of characters, primarily connected to Coach Eric Taylor, his wife Tami, and their daughter Julie. In the episode, Buddy moves in with the Taylors, while Tim meets his new neighbors. Meanwhile, Smash discovers something about Waverly, while Lyla visits Jason.

According to Nielsen Media Research, the episode was seen by an estimated 5.07 million household viewers and gained a 1.8 ratings share among adults aged 18–49. The episode received extremely positive reviews from critics, who praised the performances and storylines.

== Plot ==
The Panthers win against Royal Rock Dragons, ensuring they make it to the state semi-finals. That night, Buddy (Brad Leland) is kicked out of his house after arguing with his wife over his affair. He then asks the Taylors to stay at their house for a couple of nights, which they reluctantly allow.

During a party at his house, Tim (Taylor Kitsch) is asked by his new neighbor, Jackie (Brooke Langton), to turn down the music. The following day, he is approached by Jackie's child, Bo (Jae Head), who idolizes him. Although annoyed at first, he decides to teach him how to throw a football and even joins him to dine with Jackie. Against her mother's wishes, Bo explains that they moved after having left Jackie's abusive husband. Tim leaves soon after, planning to stay in touch with them. The following day, Tim fixes their rain gutter.

Julie (Aimee Teegarden) is annoyed by Buddy's presence on the house, especially when she is forced to stay with him as Eric (Kyle Chandler) and Tami (Connie Britton) leave to dine with the athletic director of Texas Methodist University. Bored, she decides to visit Tyra (Adrianne Palicki), who is throwing a party at her house. Julie invites Matt (Zach Gilford) and Landry (Jesse Plemons) to come over, but the party disrupts when Angela (Dana Wheeler-Nicholson) accidentally cuts herself by smashing a glass table. Requiring the presence of an adult, Julie is forced to call Tami to pick up Angela from the hospital. After putting her in bed, Tyra admonishes Tami for believing she is a bad influence in Julie's life. Seeing how difficult she is living, Tami consoles Tyra, claiming that Julie may just be growing up and she is not ready for it, and helps her in cleaning her house.

Smash (Gaius Charles) notices that Waverly (Aasha Davis) has taken a more energetic behavior, as she encourages him in swimming naked in a pool. He is asked by her father in checking on her if she notices any change in her behavior. After a party where she kisses him in front of everyone, Smash asks her about her behavior. She admits that she has stopped taking medication, which may be a cause for a mood disorder. Affected by her parents' splitting, Lyla (Minka Kelly) decides to visit Jason (Scott Porter) at the training camp, where he consoles her. However, Lyla is taken aback by Jason's teammates, as they seem to be making fun of her. She is also upset when she finds Jason's tattoo, and openly calls out Suzy (Alexandra Holden) for providing him with a tattoo. Alone with Jason, Lyla states that she is worried about his new change, as she is feeling she is not "changing" with him.

Buddy decides to move out, having discovered about Eric's meeting with TMU. Eric scolds Buddy, telling him that he should worry about his own family. Jason and Lyla finally have sex for the first time since his accident, and he promises that he will take her to the 2008 Summer Paralympics when he joins the team. Smash visits Waverly when she calls him to meet up, finding her seating alone in the kitchen's ground. Eric tells Tami that TMU has officially made him a job offer.

== Production ==
=== Development ===
In February 2007, NBC announced that the eighteenth episode of the season would be titled "Extended Families". The episode was written by consulting producer Kerry Ehrin, and directed by Charles Stone. This was Ehrin's third writing credit, and Stone's first directing credit.

== Reception ==
=== Viewers ===
In its original American broadcast, "Extended Families" was seen by an estimated 5.07 million household viewers with a 1.8 in the 18–49 demographics. This means that 1.8 percent of all households with televisions watched the episode. It finished 80th out of 102 programs airing from February 26-March 4, 2007. This was a slight decrease in viewership from the previous episode, which was watched by an estimated 5.16 million household viewers with a 1.8 in the 18–49 demographics.

=== Critical reviews ===
"Extended Families" received extremely positive reviews from critics. Eric Goldman of IGN gave the episode a "great" 8 out of 10 and wrote, "Once more Friday Night Lights proves that even on a relatively off week, it's still consistently among the best series on television. Amusingly (unless you only watch the series for the sports element), football took a backseat again, as the opening moments quickly got out of the way that the Panthers are going to the semi-finals."

Sonia Saraiya of The A.V. Club gave the episode a "B+" grade and wrote, "'Extended Families' in particular lets all of the different storylines present spin on their own, creating isolated bubbles that can be appreciated on their own."

Alan Sepinwall wrote, "I wasn't in love with the episode overall - a lot of set-up and/or elements introduced far too quickly (notably Waverly) - but the Tyra/Tami scene was superb, even though it put too neat a bow on the problem." Leah Friedman of TV Guide wrote, "In the space of three episodes I've gone from hating to loving Tim Riggins. I'm sure I'll hate him at some point again this season, but for the moment, I'm pretty enamored. When he taught little Bo how to throw a spiral, I thought I was going to crack my face open with my smile."

Brett Love of TV Squad wrote, "Overall, a solid episode. Lots of little bits of story all over the place, but the season, like the Panthers, just keeps rolling right along. Seeing how all of the various characters come together, like family, even when it's not what always how they would want things to turn out, is a nice story." Television Without Pity gave the episode a "B+" grade.
