= Best Laid Plans (Friday Night Lights) =

- Friday Night Lights episode
- Episode no.: Season 1 Episode 21
- Directed by: Jeffrey Reiner
- Written by: Kerry Ehrin; Carter Harris
- Cinematography by: David Boyd
- Editing by: Scott Gamzon; Angela Catanzaro
- Original release date: April 4, 2007
- Running time: 43 minutes

Guest appearances
- Brooke Langton as Jackie Miller; Aasha Davis as Waverly Grady; Alexandra Holden as Suzy; Aldis Hodge as Ray "Voodoo" Tatum; Brad Leland as Buddy Garrity; Jae Head as Bo Miller

Episode chronology
← Previous "Mud Bowl"	Next → "State"
- Friday Night Lights (season 1)

"Best Laid Plans" is the 21st episode of the first season of the American sports drama television series Friday Night Lights, inspired by the 1990 nonfiction book by H. G. Bissinger. The episode was written by consulting producer Kerry Ehrin and supervising producer Carter Harris, and directed by co-executive producer Jeffrey Reiner. It originally aired on NBC on April 4, 2007.

The series is set in the fictional town of Dillon, a small, close-knit community in rural West Texas. It follows a high school football team, the Dillon Panthers. It features a set of characters, primarily connected to Coach Eric Taylor, his wife Tami, and their daughter Julie. In the episode, Eric makes a controversial decision that could split his family, while Landry tries to help Tyra following her attempted assault.

According to Nielsen Media Research, the episode was seen by an estimated 5.33 million household viewers and gained a 1.9 ratings share among adults aged 18–49. The episode received extremely positive reviews from critics, who praised the performances, character development and set-up for the season finale.

== Plot ==
Before Eric (Kyle Chandler) leaves for a meeting at TMU, Tami (Connie Britton) expresses reservation over moving to another city. During the meeting, the committee asks Eric for an immediate response or the offer will be withdrawn. Eric decides to accept the new job.

Landry (Jesse Plemons) visits Tyra (Adrianne Palicki) to check on her, but she does not want to discuss the assault, and asks him not to tell anyone. Conflicted, he nevertheless discloses this to Matt (Zach Gilford), as well as Tami herself as he is verry worried about her. Tami visits Tyra, and convinces her in issuing a police report, although Tyra herself cannot recall all the events at the Alamo Freeze. After reporting, she insults Landry for breaking her trust and tells him to never talk to her ever again.

Eric announces his plans to move to Austin, Texas, devastating Julie (Aimee Teegarden). Tami proposes staying in Dillon with Julie while he accepts the offer, but Eric refuses as he believes it will separate his family. Eric also appoints Jason (Scott Porter) as the Panthers' new assistant coach, and specifically instructs him in helping Matt prepare for the game. After Buddy (Brad Leland) announces that he and his wife will divorce, Lyla (Minka Kelly) storms off. She visits Jason, finding him hanging out with Suzy (Alexandra Holden). Finally realizing their real status, Lyla throws off her ring, ending their engagement. Jackie (Brooke Langton) tells Tim (Taylor Kitsch) that they need to end their relationship, as she feels it might hurt Bo (Jae Head), which Tim reluctantly accepts.

During a roast for the Panthers, Tami talks fondly about Eric's persona, earning him applause. At the reception, Tyra apologizes to Landry for her words, but Landry is unconvinced. He criticizes her for coming with Tim, knowing they'll eventually get back together and have a miserable life due to Tim cheating on her, instead of going out with a man who truly loves and respects her. Jason tries to make amends with Lyla, but she states that it is clear they cannot be together anymore. At the Taylors' house, Eric thanks Tami for her words at the roast. When he proclaims that things will be good for them in Austin, Tami reveals that she is not going to Austin.

== Production ==
=== Development ===
In March 2007, NBC announced that the 21st episode of the season would be titled "Best Laid Plans". The episode was written by consulting producer Kerry Ehrin and supervising producer Carter Harris, and directed by co-executive producer Jeffrey Reiner. This was Ehrin's fourth writing credit, Harris' third writing credit, and Reiner's seventh directing credit.

== Reception ==
=== Viewers ===
In its original American broadcast, "Best Laid Plans" was seen by an estimated 5.33 million household viewers with a 1.9 in the 18–49 demographics. This means that 1.9 percent of all households with televisions watched the episode. It finished 69th out of 102 programs airing from April 2–8, 2007. This was a 7% decrease in viewership from the previous episode, which was watched by an estimated 5.68 million household viewers with a 2.0 in the 18–49 demographics.

=== Critical reviews ===
"Best Laid Plans" received extremely positive reviews from critics. Eric Goldman of IGN gave the episode a "great" 8.5 out of 10 and wrote, "Like Julie and Tami, I've come to adore the people of Dillon too, so here's hoping Eric decides to forget about the TMU job and stay with the Panthers, where he belongs."

Sonia Saraiya of The A.V. Club gave the episode a "B+" grade and wrote, "it seems like 'Best Laid Plans' is the messy aftermath of reaping whatever plot seeds you've sown. It's a disappointing episode, almost by design: The viewer is forced to contend with a lot of complication, after the romantic, black-and-white morals of 'Mud Bowl.'"

Alan Sepinwall wrote, "I'm a little too exhausted to do tonight's Friday Night Lights the proper justice, so I'll just say that Connie Britton is awesome, Adrianne Palicki is awesome, Jesse Plemons is awesome, and Scott Porter is awesome when he gets to be cocky." Leah Friedman of TV Guide wrote, "The more I thought about it, the more I considered last week's episode to be a high point in an exceptionally strong freshman season. Compared to that, of course, this week was going to be a bit of a come down. Part of it has to do with the fact that we're being set up for the final episode, so while we got many great little moments, something tells me they're saving the bonafide A-material for next week."

Brett Love of TV Squad wrote, "as great as it has been all season, I think tonight might have set a new high mark." Television Without Pity gave the episode an "A" grade.

Jesse Plemons submitted this episode for consideration for Outstanding Supporting Actor in a Drama Series at the 59th Primetime Emmy Awards.
