= Wind Sprints =

- Friday Night Lights episode
- Episode no.: Season 1 Episode 3
- Directed by: Jeffrey Reiner
- Written by: Elizabeth Heldens
- Cinematography by: David Boyd
- Editing by: Stephen Michael
- Original release date: October 17, 2006
- Running time: 43 minutes

Guest appearances
- Aldis Hodge as Ray "Voodoo" Tatum; Walter Perez as Bobby "Bull" Reyes

Episode chronology
| ← Previous "Eyes Wide Open" | Next → "Who's Your Daddy" |
- Friday Night Lights (season 1)

"Wind Sprints" is the third episode of the first season of the American sports drama television series Friday Night Lights, inspired by the 1990 nonfiction book by H. G. Bissinger. The episode was written by supervising producer Elizabeth Heldens and directed by co-executive producer Jeffrey Reiner. It originally aired on NBC on October 17, 2006.

The series is set in the fictional town of Dillon, a small, close-knit community in rural West Texas. It follows a high school football team, the Dillon Panthers. It features a set of characters, primarily connected to Coach Eric Taylor, his wife Tami, and their daughter Julie. In the episode, the Panthers' performance is lambasted by the media and the citizens, pressuring Eric in finding a solution.

According to Nielsen Media Research, the episode was seen by an estimated 6.55 million household viewers and gained a 2.3 ratings share among adults aged 18–49. The episode received extremely positive reviews from critics, who praised the performances, writing and emotional tone.

== Plot ==
In their first game against the South Milbank Rattlers, the Panthers struggle to stay in synchrony without Jason (Scott Porter). Despite being pushed by Eric (Kyle Chandler), the Panthers end up losing the game by six points, even with the Rattlers' weak record. Eric scolds the team for their performance, while a disappointed Jason watches the game from his hospital room.

For his failed attempt in scoring a touchdown, Matt (Zach Gilford) is ridiculed by the town while Eric's leadership is questioned. Despite being asked by Lyla (Minka Kelly) and Jason's mother to attend a supper event, Tim (Taylor Kitsch) decides to just not to go. Tyra (Adrianne Palicki) confronts him over his behavior, and he simply decides to end their relationship. Tim is uncooperative during football training, and when Eric scolds him for not taking it seriously, he takes out his helmet and walks off, surprising the team. Eric believes that Tim feels guilty about Jason's injury, even if he wasn't close to Jason during the game.

Eric is told about Ray "Voodoo" Tatum (Aldis Hodge), a quarterback from Louisiana who was displaced by Hurricane Katrina, showing promise as a potential replacement for Matt. Eric reluctantly accompanies Buddy (Brad Leland) and Mac (Blue Deckert) to a motel room where Voodoo and his family live. Buddy is offering a proper housing and fund for Voodoo if he joins the team, but Eric surprises by explaining that Voodoo must earn his place in the field. As he expresses his frustrations with Tami (Connie Britton), they watch a news report where Smash (Gaius Charles) says that Eric should be working even more on winning games. Annoyed by Smash's comments, Eric has the team meet him at the field house within 30 minutes and forces them to run wind sprints up and down a hill during a storm. While the team feels exhausted, Smash leads the team to eventually chant their motto, "clear eyes, full hearts, can't lose.", signifying that they can still find a way to win, but they have to work together. Before they head back to the field house, Eric reassures Tim that he is not to blame for Jason's condition. Nevertheless, Eric has Tim walk back home instead of accompanying the team on the bus, as punishment for walking out of practice.

Lyla is asked by her mother to not prioritize Jason's life before hers, as she feels she is only hanging out with him. During a visit, Jason finally admits his defeat at never walking again, scolding her for acting like nothing is wrong. A saddened Lyla leaves, intending to visit him the next day when he is transferred to a rehabilitation facility. As she drives home, she finds Tim walking. She confronts him over his refusal in seeing Jason, before crying in his arms as she finally admits he will never walk again. They then share a kiss. The next day, she helps Jason in leaving his room, with the latter apologizing for his behavior. During training, Eric and the team are surprised when Buddy arrives with Voodoo. Eric then shakes hands with Voodoo, welcoming him into the team.

== Production ==
=== Development ===
In September 2006, NBC announced that the third episode of the season would be titled "Wind Sprints". The episode was written by supervising producer Elizabeth Heldens and directed by co-executive producer Jeffrey Reiner. This was Heldens' first writing credit, and Reiner's second directing credit.

== Reception ==
=== Viewers ===
In its original American broadcast, "Wind Sprints" was seen by an estimated 6.55 million household viewers with a 2.3 in the 18–49 demographics. This means that 2.3 percent of all households with televisions watched the episode. It finished 62nd out of 92 programs airing from October 16–22, 2006. This was a 11% increase in viewership from the previous episode, which was watched by an estimated 5.87 million household viewers with a 2.1 in the 18–49 demographics.

=== Critical reviews ===
"Wind Sprints" received extremely positive reviews from critics. Eric Goldman of IGN gave the episode a "great" 8.0 out of 10 and wrote, "While not quite impactful as the excellent first two episodes, this was another strong installment for Friday Night Lights, a show which is doing a great job of portraying the world these characters live in and the pressures they face."

Sonia Saraiya of The A.V. Club gave the episode a "B" grade and wrote, "the shaky-cam extreme close-up had already begun to grate on me. I find it more distracting than engaging, much of the time. But it's hard to deny how powerfully it lays out the stories of its characters — characters who are some of our society's most disenfranchised." Alan Sepinwall wrote, "At first, I didn't feel the same sense of urgency I got in the first two episodes, but then we got to Taylor taking a page out of the Herb Brooks playbook and making the guys run until they came back together. Even without Berg behind the camera, the show continues to look amazing, particularly those shots at the end of the ringer QB from New Orleans wandering through the Dillon practice. And Kyle Chandler, usually such a mellow guy on screen, really had me believing in Taylor's new red-ass approach."

Brett Love of TV Squad wrote, "Overall, another good episode. It will be interesting to see where the ratings come in tomorrow. NBC did order two more scripts, but the show has been hovering around the bottom three of shows for the network, which can't be good. I'm hoping the show can hang around long enough for an audience to find it. It's deserving of one." Television Without Pity gave the episode an "A+" grade.

Jessica Toomer of Uproxx named it the ninth best episode of the series, writing, "Everyone loves a winner, and the Dillion Panthers were great at winning, but it's when they lost, when they failed miserably, that we were treated to some truly brilliant performances by the cast of the show." Hemal Jhaveri of USA Today named it among the series' best episodes, writing, "While the emotional high of watching Smash step up and scream 'clear eyes, full hearts' is great, the real gut punch comes when Coach gently tells Tim that what happened to Jason Street wasn't his fault."
