= It's Different for Girls (Friday Night Lights) =

- Friday Night Lights episode
- Episode no.: Season 1 Episode 10
- Directed by: Stephen Kay
- Written by: Andy Miller
- Cinematography by: David Boyd
- Editing by: Joshua Butler
- Original release date: December 12, 2006
- Running time: 43 minutes

Guest appearances
- Aasha Davis as Waverly Grady; Maggie Wheeler as Teacher; Rebecca McFarland as Susanne Derr; Brad Leland as Buddy Garrity

Episode chronology
← Previous "Full Hearts"	Next → "Nevermind"
- Friday Night Lights (season 1)

"It's Different for Girls" is the tenth episode of the first season of the American sports drama television series Friday Night Lights, inspired by the 1990 nonfiction book by H. G. Bissinger. The episode was written by Andy Miller and directed by Stephen Kay. It originally aired on NBC on December 12, 2006.

The series is set in the fictional town of Dillon, a small, close-knit community in rural West Texas. It follows a high school football team, the Dillon Panthers. It features a set of characters, primarily connected to Coach Eric Taylor, his wife Tami, and their daughter Julie. In the episode, Lyla becomes the target of harassment as rumors continue circulating, while Eric tries to intervene in Julie and Matt's relationship.

According to Nielsen Media Research, the episode was seen by an estimated 5.66 million household viewers and gained a 2.2 ratings share among adults aged 18–49. The episode received mostly positive reviews from critics, with praise towards the performances (particularly Minka Kelly) and themes.

== Plot ==
As the rumors intensify, Lyla (Minka Kelly) becomes the target of harassment at school, even from her cheerleading mates. Meanwhile, Jason (Scott Porter) has left the hospital and returned home, seeing that his parents are having financial problems. He also refuses to talk with Lyla, telling her not to visit him ever again.

Smash (Gaius Charles) reconnects with an old friend, Waverly Grady (Aasha Davis), who is revealed to be the local preacher's daughter. During a family dinner with Waverly and her father, Smash lies about attending the SAT courses. Eric (Kyle Chandler) and Tami (Connie Britton) grow more concerned about Julie (Aimee Teegarden), as she is spending more time with Matt (Zach Gilford). Eric does not his disapproval in front of Matt, and Julie decides to challenge her parents by announcing intentions of more dates with Matt.

Tim (Taylor Kitsch) tries to befriend Lyla at school, but Lyla dismisses him, stating that she is having worse treatment than Tim. Tyra (Adrianne Palicki) confronts Tim over his selfishness, only to discover that he really is in love with Lyla. Lyla's harassment worsens when she finds that a classmate created a website where people can insult her. Buddy (Brad Leland) is told of this by a colleague, and consoles Lyla at home. Despite an incoming cheerleading championship, Lyla decides to quit the team. Tim tries to talk with Jason about Lyla's struggles, but he dismisses it. Noticing Lyla outside, Jason talks with her, scolding her for her actions. Lyla breaks down, claiming that she stood with him and that he is everything she has left. Jason cannot bring himself to forgive her, but is moved by her statement.

After the Panthers win a game, they leave to join the cheerleaders at their championship. To prevent Matt from going out with Julie, Eric assigns to watch many football game tapes over the weekend to keep him busy. However, his plan backfires when Julie chooses to spend the morning watching the tapes with Matt. Smash starts experiencing severe nosebleeding, a result of his use of steroids. Tim visits Lyla, telling her that she should go to the championship and not let her childhood dream die just because of them. Lyla arrives in time and performs her routine, and she is delighted upon seeing that Jason attended the competition.

== Production ==
=== Development ===
In November 2006, NBC announced that the tenth episode of the season would be titled "It's Different for Girls". The episode was written by Andy Miller and directed by Stephen Kay. This was Miller's first writing credit, and Kay's first directing credit.

== Reception ==
=== Viewers ===
In its original American broadcast, "It's Different for Girls" was seen by an estimated 5.66 million household viewers with a 2.2 in the 18–49 demographics. This means that 2.2 percent of all households with televisions watched the episode. This was a 8% decrease in viewership from the previous episode, which was watched by an estimated 6.13 million household viewers with a 2.2 in the 18–49 demographics.

=== Critical reviews ===
"It's Different for Girls" received mostly positive reviews from critics. Eric Goldman of IGN gave the episode a "good" 7.8 out of 10 and wrote, "Coming on the heels of last week's firing on all cylinders episode, this week's Friday Night Lights had a lot to live up to, and it couldn't match up. This was a decent but unexceptional episode of the series."

Sonia Saraiya of The A.V. Club gave the episode an "A" grade and wrote, "The weirdest takeaway from 'It's Different For Girls' is the show's tacit admission that — it just is. There's no attempt to make anyone suddenly embrace feminism. There's no broad arc where a character radically changes their point of view about who they call sluts or rethinks the double standard between men who cheat and women who do. It just is different for girls, because the world is not fair. And that's not just a problem with football, Dillon, or Texas; it's everywhere. Maybe the exact way in which it's not fair is different in different places. But the basic unfairness of things remains constant."

Alan Sepinwall wrote, "Not a whole lot to say about the latest Friday Night Lights, save that Minka Kelly's line delivery drives me nuts, and that Kyle Chandler is comedy gold in his disgusted reactions to Julie and Matt." Leah Friedman of TV Guide wrote, "My only complaint about this episode was that the Panthers had a game in which they apparently played all four quarters well, and we didn't get to see any of it! I love this show and the way it has developed all of these interpersonal relationships, but it is called Friday Night Lights, and as such, I want some more football. Maybe we'll see some when the show comes back after the new year."

Brett Love of TV Squad wrote, "Overall, another great episode. The show continues to impress week after week. Now, if only that translated into viewers..." Television Without Pity gave the episode an "A–" grade.

Minka Kelly submitted this episode for consideration for Outstanding Supporting Actress in a Drama Series at the 59th Primetime Emmy Awards.
