= What to Do While You're Waiting =

- Friday Night Lights episode
- Episode no.: Season 1 Episode 12
- Directed by: David Boyd
- Written by: Kerry Ehrin
- Cinematography by: Todd McMullen
- Editing by: Angela M. Catanzaro
- Original release date: January 10, 2007
- Running time: 43 minutes

Guest appearances
- Tim Guinee as Bob; Aasha Davis as Waverly Grady; Dana Wheeler-Nicholson as Angela Collette; Brad Leland as Buddy Garrity

Episode chronology
← Previous "Nevermind"	Next → "Little Girl I Wanna Marry You"
- Friday Night Lights (season 1)

"What to Do While You're Waiting" is the twelfth episode of the first season of the American sports drama television series Friday Night Lights, inspired by the 1990 nonfiction book by H. G. Bissinger. The episode was written by consulting producer Kerry Ehrin and directed by David Boyd. It originally aired on NBC on January 10, 2007.

The series is set in the fictional town of Dillon, a small, close-knit community in rural West Texas. It follows a high school football team, the Dillon Panthers. It features a set of characters, primarily connected to Coach Eric Taylor, his wife Tami, and their daughter Julie. In the episode, the Taylors face a lawsuit from the Streets, while Tyra faces problems at her own home.

According to Nielsen Media Research, the episode was seen by an estimated 6.41 million household viewers and gained a 2.3 ratings share among adults aged 18–49. The episode received generally positive reviews from critics, with praise towards the performances, but some criticized its pacing.

== Plot ==
The Panthers are on a bye week, but their fate at the championship depends on the Buckley vs Arnett Meade game. Henry (Brent Smiga) tells Matt (Zach Gilford) that he won't be leaving for Iraq, planning to help him with Lorraine (Louanne Stephens). A delighted Matt visits Buddy (Brad Leland) and convinces him in hiring Henry as a salesman.

Eric (Kyle Chandler) and Tami (Connie Britton) are notified that the Street family is planning to sue them, citing that Eric not teaching Jason (Scott Porter) about tackles resulted in his injury. Jason is infuriated at the news, as he refuses to believe Eric was at fault. However, he has to comply as his parents are constantly arguing due to the unpaid debts. He is comforted by Lyla (Minka Kelly), who says she supports his decision to go forward with the lawsuit.

Henry struggles in selling cars, so Buddy has him wear a pin that highlights his military service. Henry is reluctant in doing it, but ends up putting it. Matt is asked by Smash (Gaius Charles), in setting a double date between them and Julie (Aimee Teegarden) and Waverly (Aasha Davis), also asking them to lie for him in order to look more interesting. However, Waverly is not convinced by Julie's vouching and calls out Smash over his lies. Smash decides to participate in an arm wrestling match, prompting Waverly to leave him.

Tyra (Adrianne Palicki) is annoyed by the presence of Bob (Tim Guinee), a man who dates her mother, Angela (Dana Wheeler-Nicholson). When Bob slaps Angela, Tyra attacks him with a fire poker and kicks him out of the house. Noticing that her mother is using pills, she decides to take her to a rodeo at the town fair. There, she convinces her mother in becoming more responsible and not rely on someone like Bob again. Alone, she is approached by Tim (Taylor Kitsch), who asks for another chance with her while asking for forgiveness. Tyra is moved, but states that she'd be a "hypocrite" if she accepted to getting back together with him.

Buckley ends up winning the game, which allows Dillon to go to the playoffs. The following day, Jason talks with Eric, stating that the lawsuit was not up to him and that Eric will always be his coach. Angela tells Tyra that she has chosen her daughter over Bob, and they both embrace. Smash apologizes to Waverly for his lies, admitting his selfishness but also his feelings towards her. Waverly accepts his apology and says she will continue seeing him.

== Production ==
=== Development ===
In December 2006, NBC announced that the twelfth episode of the season would be titled "What to Do While You're Waiting". The episode was written by consulting producer Kerry Ehrin and directed by David Boyd. This was Ehrin's second writing credit, and Boyd's first directing credit.

== Reception ==
=== Viewers ===
In its original American broadcast, "What to Do While You're Waiting" was seen by an estimated 6.41 million household viewers with a 2.3 in the 18–49 demographics. This means that 2.3 percent of all households with televisions watched the episode. It finished 61st out of 99 programs airing from January 8–14, 2007. This was a 2% increase in viewership from the previous episode, which was watched by an estimated 6.28 million household viewers with a 2.2 in the 18–49 demographics.

=== Critical reviews ===
"What to Do While You're Waiting" received generally positive reviews from critics. Eric Goldman of IGN gave the episode a "great" 8 out of 10 and wrote, "We've seen plenty of stories where there's a pivotal game that can get the team we're following into the playoffs. But on Friday Night Lights they decided to take the road less traveled, by having the game that would decide the Panthers fate be one they weren't actually part of."

Sonia Saraiya of The A.V. Club gave the episode a "B+" grade and wrote, "The [episode] is a structure that Friday Night Lights leans on a lot — Dillon's own football games are usually the big capper on top of the columns, holding together the stories in this community and providing meaning for everyone involved. From a televisual perspective, it also follows a more traditional plot/subplot structure — offering isolated adventures that will come together in a moment of climax, but generally spin their wheels on their own."

Alan Sepinwall wrote, "Definitely not one of my favorite episodes. In its best moments, FNL feels almost documentary-like in its authenticity, which is why I get uncomfortable when it starts acting like Just Another High School Drama, and the Saracen and Tyra stories both fell into the latter category." Leah Friedman of TV Guide wrote, "I think that the whole episode boiled down to Coach Taylor's philosophy: 'We can't make this personal.' Of course, this raises the question: Where do you draw the line? Everything that wasn’t personal about the lawsuit (the need for money to pay for Jason's rehab and equipment) is tied to the fact that this is someone who helped raise Jason."

Brett Love of TV Squad wrote, "This was a strange episode of Friday Night Lights. Not that it was bad, just that it seemed to lack the polish that earlier episodes have had. A couple of the stories seemed rushed, or maybe a little disjointed. For example, the resolution to the cliff-hanger from last week." Television Without Pity gave the episode an "A+" grade.
