= Full Hearts =

- Friday Night Lights episode
- Episode no.: Season 1 Episode 9
- Directed by: Josh Pate
- Written by: Aaron Rahsaan Thomas
- Cinematography by: David Boyd
- Editing by: Stephen Michael
- Original release date: December 5, 2006
- Running time: 43 minutes

Guest appearance
- Brad Leland as Buddy Garrity

Episode chronology
← Previous "Crossing the Line"	Next → "It's Different for Girls"
- Friday Night Lights (season 1)

"Full Hearts" is the ninth episode of the first season of the American sports drama television series Friday Night Lights, inspired by the 1990 nonfiction book by H. G. Bissinger. The episode was written by Aaron Rahsaan Thomas and directed by Josh Pate. It originally aired on NBC on December 5, 2006.

The series is set in the fictional town of Dillon, a small, close-knit community in rural West Texas. It follows a high school football team, the Dillon Panthers. It features a set of characters, primarily connected to Coach Eric Taylor, his wife Tami, and their daughter Julie. In the episode, Smash worries about going back to his hometown for the next game, while Matt and Julie go on a date.

According to Nielsen Media Research, the episode was seen by an estimated 6.13 million household viewers and gained a 2.2 ratings share among adults aged 18–49. The episode received critical acclaim, with critics praising the performances, writing, character development and humor.

== Plot ==
Smash (Gaius Charles) uses the church donations to pay for the steroids, although he feels guilt over his actions. He is also concerned about his upcoming game, which will take place at Gatling, his hometown. At the hospital, Lyla (Minka Kelly) tries to apologize to Jason (Scott Porter) over her affair with Tim (Taylor Kitsch), but Jason removes all their pictures from the wall, ending their relationship. A dejected Lyla leaves the hospital, leaving a present for Jason at the entrance.

Matt (Zach Gilford) prepares for his date with Julie (Aimee Teegarden), buying a Members Only jacket when pressured by Landry (Jesse Plemons). When he arrives to pick her up, Tami (Connie Britton) disapproves of Julie's clothing and forces her to change it. He takes her to a theater to watch Eragon but the screening is sold out, and he unsuccessfully tries to use his status as quarterback to get preferential treatment. Their date is cut short when Landry, who is watching Lorraine (Louanne Stephens), calls when Lorraine has a breakdown, forcing Matt to take Julie at his house and calm his grandmother by singing "Mr. Sandman". Julie asks Landry to take her home, and Matt believes he blew it, although Landry says that she thought it was sweet. Separately, Julie tells Tami that for the first time, she saw the "real" Matt.

Rumors start circulating around high school regarding Lyla and Tim's affair, with Tim being sidelined by the team when they believe he punched Jason. The team visits Jason at the hospital, who states that he was the one who punched Tim. When they deduce the rumors are real, they say they will "take care" of the situation. Later, the team intercepts Tim as he arrives home, smashing his pick-up with baseball bats. As he cleans it, Tyra (Adrianne Palicki) shows up and angrily slaps him for sleeping with Lyla, ending their relationship again. She visits Jason at the hospital with beer, and they both bond by mocking Tim and Lyla.

Tami and Buddy (Brad Leland) are forced to meet with Gatling boosters in order to get better motels for the team, successfully convincing them by promising a good treatment when Gatling visits Dillon. Smash wants to know more about his deceased father, something that his mother has never wanted to discuss. After a bad experience at his old childhood place, he finally talks with his mother, who confesses that his father died while driving with a woman on an affair. That night, he visits his father's gravestone. During the game, Dillon struggles against Gatling's defense, resulting in Tim getting injured in his own end zone and a safety in Gatling's favor. During this, Lyla storms off the field when she is mocked over her affair. Buddy consoles her in the parking lot, affirming that he cares more for her than a game. Back at the game, Eric (Kyle Chandler) gets Tim back on the game after he recovers from his injury, and he leads the Panthers to win the game with a touchdown from Smash. Julie descends to the field to congratulate Matt, who surprises her by kissing her on the lips.

== Production ==
=== Development ===
In November 2006, NBC announced that the ninth episode of the season would be titled "Full Hearts". The episode was written by Aaron Rahsaan Thomas and directed by Josh Pate. This was Thomas' first writing credit, and Pate's first directing credit.

== Reception ==
=== Viewers ===
In its original American broadcast, "Full Hearts" was seen by an estimated 6.13 million household viewers with a 2.2 in the 18–49 demographics. This means that 2.2 percent of all households with televisions watched the episode. It finished 70th out of 104 programs airing from December 4–10, 2006. This was a slight decrease in viewership from the previous episode, which was watched by an estimated 6.18 million household viewers with a 2.2 in the 18–49 demographics.

=== Critical reviews ===
"Full Hearts" received critical acclaim. Eric Goldman of IGN gave the episode an "amazing" 9.5 out of 10 and wrote, "Friday Night Lights had one of its best and emotional episodes so far this week, with several of the plotlines going right for the gut, and always hitting their mark."

Sonia Saraiya of The A.V. Club gave the episode an "A–" grade and wrote, "There are a lot of pieces moving around in this episode, and I'm not going to get to all of them. Aside from Smash, there's Saracen and Julie's date. It's telling that Saracen is a ball of nerves off the field, but grounded and calm on the football field. Literally on the field, which is why that's where he finally kisses Julie. [...] So I'm going to hold off on that for now. But damn if I didn't choke up when Buddy Garrity tells Lyla that football is 'only a game.'"

Alan Sepinwall wrote, "This was the funniest FNL has ever been, what with Coach's 'At least she's not interested in a serial killer -- or one of the Rigggins,' Landry playing personal shopper, Taylor's horrified response to the Members Only jacket and Julie's hoochie dress, the worthlessness of the QB One thing at the movie theater, Landry explaining why the grandma singing was the only thing he did right on the date, 'Lance,' etc. Is something going very wrong or very right when Taylor has as many funny lines as Landry?" Leah Friedman of TV Guide wrote, "Buddy Garrity, I forgive you. [...] Yes, he's (how to put it delicately?) not a nice guy when dealing with his beloved Panthers, but his, 'It's only a game, you're my daughter' line just got to me. Remember how I said that no one on this show was beyond redemption? This just proves it."

Brett Love of TV Squad wrote, "If my clock is right, we didn't get any actual game footage until 53 minutes into the hour. And that's fine by me. All three of the stories from this week were great, and the little bit of the game that we did get covered everything we needed to know." Television Without Pity gave the episode an "A+" grade.
