= Blinders (Friday Night Lights) =

- Friday Night Lights episode
- Episode no.: Season 1 Episode 15
- Directed by: Stephen Kay
- Written by: Bridget Carpenter; Carter Harris
- Cinematography by: David Boyd
- Editing by: Scott Gamzon
- Original release date: February 7, 2007
- Running time: 43 minutes

Guest appearances
- Dana Wheeler-Nicholson as Angela Collette; Brett Cullen as Walt Riggins; Kevin Rankin as Herc; Aasha Davis as Waverly Grady; Brad Leland as Buddy Garrity

Episode chronology
← Previous "Upping the Ante"	Next → "Black Eyes and Broken Hearts"
- Friday Night Lights (season 1)

"Blinders" is the fifteenth episode of the first season of the American sports drama television series Friday Night Lights, inspired by the 1990 nonfiction book by H. G. Bissinger. The episode was written by producer Bridget Carpenter and supervising producer Carter Harris, and directed by Stephen Kay. It originally aired on NBC on February 7, 2007.

The series is set in the fictional town of Dillon, a small, close-knit community in rural West Texas. It follows a high school football team, the Dillon Panthers. It features a set of characters, primarily connected to Coach Eric Taylor, his wife Tami, and their daughter Julie. In the episode, controversy arises when Mac makes racist comments, dividing the team members. Meanwhile, Jason tries to return to his regular life, while Julie and Tyra are forced to take part in the girls powderpuff game.

According to Nielsen Media Research, the episode was seen by an estimated 6.41 million household viewers and gained a 2.3 ratings share among adults aged 18–49. The episode received critical acclaim, with critics praising the episode's handling of its subject matter and performances.

== Plot ==
The Panthers easily win their first playoff game. However, Mac (Blue Deckert) causes problems when he gives an interview addressing the lack of diversity in the team roster. He states that white men like Matt (Zach Gilford) are inherently smarter than black men like Smash (Gaius Charles).

When Julie (Aimee Teegarden) and Tyra (Adrianne Palicki) skip classes, Tami (Connie Britton) assigns them to participate in the girls powderpuff game. The game will consist of two teams, with Matt and Tim (Taylor Kitsch) leading the teams separately. Matt picks up Tyra and Julie for his team, while Tim picks up Lyla (Minka Kelly). While Tim efficiently trains his team, Matt struggles in balancing his team. With no other option, he gets Julie to be quarterback, which she reluctantly accepts. After training with Eric (Kyle Chandler), Julie leads her team to a victory.

Jason (Scott Porter) decides to return to his normal life, such as going back to school and asking Herc (Kevin Rankin) in helping him learn how to drive with his condition. Afterwards, Herc introduces him to his quad rugby squad, telling him he will be going to a training camp in Austin to join them. Jason is delighted when he learns of an opportunity to be part of the United States national wheelchair rugby team and possibly going to the 2008 Summer Paralympics. He shares this with Lyla, who is conflicted over his decision in not taking school seriously.

As the town criticizes Mac's remarks, the topic of racism is discussed across school. Smash (Gaius Charles) does not find the comments offensive, but Waverly (Aasha Davis) is annoyed by his lack of concern. Smash also has a heated argument with Tim, claiming he does not speak for his fellow black players. However, his perception changes when he attends a forum that discusses the events, where Waverly proclaims that the lack of interest in resolving the conflict makes for a larger issue. As a fight ensues during the forum, Smash tries to talk to Mac, who dismisses any of his statements. The following day, Smash joins his black teammates in a protest, refusing to follow Mac's orders. When Mac demands they comply with his orders, Smash and his teammates walk out of the field.

== Production ==
=== Development ===
In January 2007, NBC announced that the fifteenth episode of the season would be titled "Blinders". The episode was written by producer Bridget Carpenter and supervising producer Carter Harris, and directed by Stephen Kay. This was Carpenter's second writing credit, Harris' second writing credit, and Kay's second directing credit.

== Reception ==
=== Viewers ===
In its original American broadcast, "Blinders" was seen by an estimated 6.41 million household viewers with a 2.3 in the 18–49 demographics. This means that 2.3 percent of all households with televisions watched the episode. It finished 67th out of 100 programs airing from February 5–11, 2007. This was a 5% decrease in viewership from the previous episode, which was watched by an estimated 6.73 million household viewers with a 2.4 in the 18–49 demographics.

=== Critical reviews ===
"Blinders" received critical acclaim. Eric Goldman of IGN gave the episode an "amazing" 9 out of 10 and wrote, "This week's Friday Night Lights was a wonderful installment (do we say that every week?) that managed to incorporate every character in an interesting way; some as comic relief, some in very serious situations, some as both."

Sonia Saraiya of The A.V. Club gave the episode an "A" grade and wrote, "'Blinders' is politically charged, and because most of us aren’t from west Texas, it's a haunting travelogue. Haunting in both good and bad ways, if that makes sense."

Alan Sepinwall wrote, "I'm glad they did the racial storyline, as the movie completely wimped out on this aspect of Bissinger's book. My only complaint was how tied it was to the Smash/Waverly relationship, and I'm completely bored by her." Leah Friedman of TV Guide wrote, "after watching this episode, my appreciation for this gem of a show was yet again renewed. I'm not sure whether this had anything to do with the recent spate of somewhat similar incidents in the entertainment industry, but the story line was mercifully subtler than anything I would have expected it to be, which I definitely appreciated."

Brett Love of TV Squad wrote, "What I didn't expect was Street saying coming back to school was a mistake. I thought we would see him struggle with it, and we did somewhat with the biology class. But I expected more of an overcoming obstacles angle. It's something we might get yet." Television Without Pity gave the episode an "A–" grade.
