= Little Girl I Wanna Marry You =

- Friday Night Lights episode
- Episode no.: Season 1 Episode 13
- Directed by: Jeffrey Reiner
- Written by: Jason Katims
- Cinematography by: David Boyd
- Editing by: Stephen Michael
- Original release date: January 24, 2007
- Running time: 43 minutes

Guest appearances
- Dana Wheeler-Nicholson as Angela Collette; Kevin Rankin as Herc; Brad Leland as Buddy Garrity

Episode chronology
← Previous "What to Do While You're Waiting"	Next → "Upping the Ante"
- Friday Night Lights (season 1)

"Little Girl I Wanna Marry You" is the thirteenth episode of the first season of the American sports drama television series Friday Night Lights, inspired by the 1990 nonfiction book by H. G. Bissinger. The episode was written by executive producer Jason Katims and directed by co-executive producer Jeffrey Reiner. It originally aired on NBC on January 24, 2007.

The series is set in the fictional town of Dillon, a small, close-knit community in rural West Texas. It follows a high school football team, the Dillon Panthers. It features a set of characters, primarily connected to Coach Eric Taylor, his wife Tami, and their daughter Julie. In the episode, Smash faces problems when his steroids are found, while Tyra tries to get her mother a new job. Meanwhile, Matt receives disappointing news from Henry, and Jason considers his future with Lyla.

According to Nielsen Media Research, the episode was seen by an estimated 5.66 million household viewers and gained a 2.0 ratings share among adults aged 18–49. The episode received critical acclaim, with critics praising the storylines, performances and themes.

== Plot ==
Smash (Gaius Charles) is confronted by his mother, Corrina (Liz Mikel), after she discovers his steroids while cleaning his room. She takes him before Eric (Kyle Chandler), accusing him of supplying her son with the doses. When Eric makes it clear he was not aware of this, Corrina stares at her son in disappointment.

After an argument with Corrina, Smash is kicked out of the house and is forced to sleep in his car. Eric also angrily scolds Smash for his actions, as it can have severe repercussions on the team. He suspends Smash from the following game citing "internal matters", debating whether to report Smash's drug use to the administration. Smash finally has a conversation with Corrina, lamenting how his mistake may have ruined his potential career as well as the family's future. While Corrina is still upset, she consoles Smash, stating that his over-eagerness consumed him.

Tyra (Adrianne Palicki) tries to get a job for Angela (Dana Wheeler-Nicholson), as she was relying on Bob's finances to get going in the house. Trying to get an interview with Buddy (Brad Leland), she asks Tim (Taylor Kitsch) to vouch for her. Despite Tim's affair with Lyla (Minka Kelly), Buddy arranges for an interview with Angela. On the way to the interview, Tyra and Angela get stranded after a flat tire. When Angela considers returning with Bob, Tyra snaps at her, telling her that she cannot rely on him and that she hopes she does not end up becoming like Angela herself.

When Lyla agrees to study with Buddy's friend's son, Jason (Scott Porter) questions if the encounter is set up as a date. That night, he confronts Buddy who confesses his disapproval of Lyla and Jasons' relationship, stating that Jason's disability will force Lyla to be the "caregiver" of their family.

Matt studies game film as preparation for playing against the South Pines Tigers. Noticing tendencies in their defensive coverage that could be exploited with a slant, he designs a play and informs Eric, who ignores his advice. Henry (Brent Smiga) tells Matt (Zach Gilford) that his unit called, and that he will be going back to Iraq, disappointing him. He, Lorraine (Louanne Stephens) and Julie (Aimee Teegarden) go to the bus station to bid him farewell. Tami (Connie Britton) is convinced of joining Mayor Rodell's re-election campaign, although she is warned to keep the mayor's lesbianism in secret.

In their game against the South Pines Tigers, Eric reveals to Matt that the Tigers have the best safeties in the state, and that the apparent weakness in their defense is a trap, which is why he ignored his advice. Nonetheless, with no other options but to throw the ball, Matt persuades Eric to allow him to attempt throwing the slant anyway. The play call succeeds, and the Panthers win the game.

After the game, Buddy finally meets with Angela and he hires her as his new receptionist. Eric tells Smash that he will not report him, but Smash will have to submit to private drug testing until he is completely clean. He tells Smash that a dishwasher nearby was an aspiring quarterback whose career ended at Notre Dame after making Grady Hunt's shortlist. He tells him not to base his opinion of himself on recruiters, but on people in his life that already love him.

Jason meets with Lyla, who knows he spied on her meeting. He says that he felt inspired by Herc (Kevin Rankin) in overcoming his disability in becoming a better man. He asks Lyla to marry him, and they both kiss.

== Production ==
=== Development ===
In January 2007, NBC announced that the thirteenth episode of the season would be titled "Little Girl I Wanna Marry You". The episode was written by executive producer Jason Katims and directed by co-executive producer Jeffrey Reiner. This was Katims' second writing credit, and Reiner's fourth directing credit.

== Reception ==
=== Viewers ===
In its original American broadcast, "Little Girl I Wanna Marry You" was seen by an estimated 5.66 million household viewers with a 2.0 in the 18–49 demographics. This means that 2.0 percent of all households with televisions watched the episode. It finished 67th out of 103 programs airing from January 22–28, 2007. This was a 12% decrease in viewership from the previous episode, which was watched by an estimated 6.41 million household viewers with a 2.3 in the 18–49 demographics.

=== Critical reviews ===
"Little Girl I Wanna Marry You" received critical acclaim. Eric Goldman of IGN gave the episode a "great" 8.5 out of 10 and wrote, "Eric and Tami Taylor continue to be one of the warmest and most engaging portrayals of a married couple. [...] There were several wonderful moments for Eric and Tami throughout the episode, which continued after the two paid a fateful visit to Mayor Rodell's home."

Sonia Saraiya of The A.V. Club gave the episode an "A–" grade and wrote, "It feels like each character goes through a crucible in 'Little Girl I Wanna Marry You' — and inside each tiny crucible is space for just one connection or relationship, and for a brief moment in time, that connection is going to burn. Both of these episodes distinguish themselves with incredible conversations between characters, but 'Little Girl I Wanna Marry You' has some really fantastic ones." Leah Friedman of TV Guide wrote, "it was certainly sweet to watch them win (and on a Matt Saracen-designed play no less!), and I'm looking forward to seeing what happens when the expectations get ratcheted up even further."

Brett Love of TV Squad wrote, "Outstanding. This installment of FNL was just jam packed with story and there was enough of it for everyone to get a little piece. More than any other episode, this one balanced everything out so the entire cast got to play." Television Without Pity gave the episode an "A+" grade.

Gaius Charles submitted this episode for consideration for Outstanding Supporting Actor in a Drama Series, while Liz Mikel and Dana Wheeler-Nicholson submitted it for Outstanding Guest Actress in a Drama Series at the 59th Primetime Emmy Awards.
