= Homecoming (Friday Night Lights) =

- Friday Night Lights episode
- Episode no.: Season 1 Episode 7
- Directed by: Patrick Norris
- Written by: David Hudgins
- Cinematography by: David Boyd
- Editing by: Scott Gamzon; Jim Towne
- Original release date: November 14, 2006
- Running time: 43 minutes

Guest appearances
- Kevin Rankin as Herc; Brad Leland as Buddy Garrity

Episode chronology
← Previous "El Accidente"	Next → "Crossing the Line"
- Friday Night Lights (season 1)

"Homecoming" is the seventh episode of the first season of the American sports drama television series Friday Night Lights, inspired by the 1990 nonfiction book by H. G. Bissinger. The episode was written by producer David Hudgins and directed by Patrick Norris. It originally aired on NBC on November 14, 2006.

The series is set in the fictional town of Dillon, a small, close-knit community in rural West Texas. It follows a high school football team, the Dillon Panthers. It features a set of characters, primarily connected to Coach Eric Taylor, his wife Tami, and their daughter Julie. In the episode, Dillon prepares for a new game during homecoming, where Smash hopes to impress a scout.

According to Nielsen Media Research, the episode was seen by an estimated 5.48 million household viewers and gained a 1.9 ratings share among adults aged 18–49. The episode received near critical acclaim, with critics praising the performances and focus on the characters of Jason and Smash.

== Plot ==
At a homecoming preparation event in Dillon, Tim (Taylor Kitsch) tries to talk with Lyla (Minka Kelly) about their status, but Lyla is more concerned about Tim's alcoholism. The event welcomes past alumni, which includes Lucas Mize (Chad Brannon), a Dillon alumnus and quarterback from the 2000 state championship team. Lucas introduces Smash (Gaius Charles) to scout Grady Hunt (Richard Dillard), who decides to take a chance with him.

Lucas confides in Eric (Kyle Chandler) that he is unemployed and that he failed at his college football career. He asks him for a position as a coaching assistant, but Eric declines due to a lack of budget. Eric comforts a stressed Smash, as Hunt will be interested in offering a scholarship based on his performance in the homecoming game. Meanwhile, Tim's brother, Billy (Derek Phillips), convinces Tyra (Adrianne Palicki) in helping with setting a postgame party. Tyra learns that Tim has decided to stop drinking.

Jason (Scott Porter) shares with Herc (Kevin Rankin) his suspicion that Lyla and Tim might be in a relationship. Herc advises him to attend the homecoming event and confront them about it. He tells Lyla that he is attending homecoming, but lies by claiming he is doing it for his father.

Before their rematch against Laribee Lions, Jason makes an entrance for the Panthers and receives a standing ovation by the audience. Smash plays poorly and the Panthers are losing by halftime. Eric scolds Smash, noting that he is underperforming due to Hunt's presence in the audience.

During the second half, Smash fumbles and the Laribee Lions score another touchdown, forcing Eric to replace him with Tim at tailback. With the change, Tim leads the team to a comeback 28–17 victory, but Smash is humiliated upon seeing Hunt leave the game. Tim is given the football as a trophy, and he in turn gives it to Jason for inspiring them, who quietly thanks him without confrontation.

A saddened Smash visits Hunt to ask about his prospects, who tells him to work on his size and strength. Desperate, Smash decides to start injecting himself with testosterone cypionate.

== Production ==
=== Development ===
In October 2006, NBC announced that the seventh episode of the season would be titled "Homecoming". The episode was written by producer David Hudgins and directed by Patrick Norris. This was Hudgins' first writing credit, and Norris' first directing credit.

== Reception ==
=== Viewers ===
In its original American broadcast, "Homecoming" was seen by an estimated 5.48 million household viewers with a 1.9 in the 18–49 demographics. This means that 1.9 percent of all households with televisions watched the episode. It finished 73rd out of 99 programs airing from November 13–19, 2006. This was a 8% decrease in viewership from the previous episode, which was watched by an estimated 5.94 million household viewers with a 2.1 in the 18–49 demographics.

=== Critical reviews ===
"Homecoming" received near critical acclaim. Eric Goldman of IGN gave the episode a "great" 8.8 out of 10 and wrote, "It's too narrow minded to say the show is about a football team; rather, the series is showing what life is like for the residents of this specific, and yes, football-minded, town."

Sonia Saraiya of The A.V. Club gave the episode an "A–" grade and wrote, "'Homecoming' is a shaggier episode, but damn, I love it. On a story level, it doesn't quite deliver the complete arcs that 'El Accidente' does. It's a far more deconstructed and impressionistic episode — in a way that recalls the pilot episode. But it also plays the viewer like a violin, eliciting all the required notes and then finishing with a flourish. I don't even really like Jason Street, but his return to the Panthers field is totally heartbreaking."

Alan Sepinwall wrote, "there was the Jason Street subplot to make the rest of it more than palatable. Even when the rest of the show is taking narrative shortcuts or reverting to cliche, they continue to do right by this character and his story, and Scott Porter tends to get me choked up at least once a week." Leah Friedman of TV Guide wrote, "The most emotional moment last night was, of course, when Street led his team onto the field. I don't know why I got choked up, but it was certainly something to watch the entire town rally around him."

Brett Love of TV Squad wrote, "All in all, this wasn't my favorite episode. There were just too many little things that didn't quite work. In the bigger picture of the series though, it did deliver a lot of pieces that will figure in, so it certainly wasn't a bad episode." Television Without Pity gave the episode a "B" grade.
