= I Think We Should Have Sex =

- Friday Night Lights episode
- Episode no.: Season 1 Episode 17
- Directed by: Allison Liddi-Brown
- Written by: Elizabeth Heldens
- Cinematography by: David Boyd
- Editing by: Peter B. Ellis
- Original release date: February 21, 2007
- Running time: 44 minutes

Guest appearances
- Brett Cullen as Walt Riggins; Dana Wheeler-Nicholson as Angela Collette; Alexandra Holden as Suzy; Kevin Rankin as Herc; Brad Leland as Buddy Garrity

Episode chronology
← Previous "Black Eyes and Broken Hearts"	Next → "Extended Families"
- Friday Night Lights (season 1)

"I Think We Should Have Sex" is the seventeenth episode of the first season of the American sports drama television series Friday Night Lights, inspired by the 1990 nonfiction book by H. G. Bissinger. The episode was written by co-executive producer Elizabeth Heldens and directed by Allison Liddi-Brown. It originally aired on NBC on February 21, 2007.

The series is set in the fictional town of Dillon, a small, close-knit community in rural West Texas. It follows a high school football team, the Dillon Panthers. It features a set of characters, primarily connected to Coach Eric Taylor, his wife Tami, and their daughter Julie. In the episode, Julie and Matt consider having sex, while Tim's relationship with his father takes a turn.

According to Nielsen Media Research, the episode was seen by an estimated 5.16 million household viewers and gained a 1.8 ratings share among adults aged 18–49. The episode received critical acclaim, with critics praising the episode's handling of sex, humor and performances.

== Plot ==
At a bar, Walt (Brett Cullen) hustles a man in pool, and Tim (Taylor Kitsch) fights the man until he pays the debt. Tyra (Adrianne Palicki) is concerned about Tim's returning alcoholism, but Walt is convinced that his son can handle it. After studying, Julie (Aimee Teegarden) tells Matt (Zach Gilford) that they should have sex, surprising him.

Buddy (Brad Leland) tells Eric (Kyle Chandler) that he has had an affair with Angela (Dana Wheeler-Nicholson), despite his marriage and leadership status. Eric tells him to call it for the sake of his family. Buddy decides to relocate Angela to another office, devastating her. When an expensive camera goes missing from the team's AV room, a coach reports that Walt was seen entering the room before the camera went missing. Eric questions Walt at home, who is defended by Tim, prompting Eric to leave. However, the following morning, Tim finds the camera and confronts Walt. Walt simply storms off, and Tim once again falls again into alcoholism. He gets himself in a bar fight, forcing Tyra and Billy (Derek Phillips) to pick him up.

Jason (Scott Porter) and Herc (Kevin Rankin) arrive at Austin for the training camp. There, Jason bonds with one of the members, Suzy (Alexandra Holden), a tattoo artist who gives him a tattoo. Smash (Gaius Charles) tells Matt that he needs to consider the proper time and place to have sex, also advicing him to buy condoms. As he and Landry (Jesse Plemons) buy at the shop, they are spotted by Tami (Connie Britton). She asks Julie about it, and the latter confesses they were thinking of having sex. An upset Tami scolds her, telling her she is not thinking about the possible ramifications. Julie says she understands, but later tells Matt that they will proceed with the plan. For this, Matt gets a lake house from a friend, although he is dismayed with the furniture.

Eric and Tami discover Julie's plan to lose her virginity, but are unable to stop as they do not know her location. Julie and Matt make out at the cabin, but it becomes clear that neither actually wants to have sex, so they spend the night hanging out in the lake house. Julie returns home, telling her parents that she didn't have sex, relieving them. At a church service, Angela slaps Buddy for firing her, revealing their affair to his family. Tim visits Eric at his house, returning the camera that Walt stole.

== Production ==
=== Development ===
In February 2007, NBC announced that the seventeenth episode of the season would be titled "I Think We Should Have Sex". The episode was written by co-executive producer Elizabeth Heldens, and directed by Allison Liddi-Brown. This was Heldens' third writing credit, and Liddi-Brown's third directing credit.

== Reception ==
=== Viewers ===
In its original American broadcast, "I Think We Should Have Sex" was seen by an estimated 5.16 million household viewers with a 1.8 in the 18–49 demographics. This means that 1.8 percent of all households with televisions watched the episode. It finished 76th out of 99 programs airing from February 19–25, 2007. This was a 31% decrease in viewership from the previous episode, which was watched by an estimated 7.43 million household viewers with a 2.6 in the 18–49 demographics.

=== Critical reviews ===
"I Think We Should Have Sex" received critical acclaim. Eric Goldman of IGN gave the episode a "great" 8.5 out of 10 and wrote, "The first time... It's a big moment in anyone's life. For Matt and Julie, it seemed the time was upon them to take things to the next level and add S E X to their relationship. This episode of Friday Night Lights deftly followed the path this took, beginning with Julie telling Matt she thought it was time, and him vigorously nodding in agreement."

Sonia Saraiya of The A.V. Club gave the episode an "A–" grade and wrote, "though 'I Think We Should Have Sex' is literally a line that Julie says to Matt, it's Julie's relationship to her parents that is really the point of this story. What strikes me about the Julie/Matt storyline is how, in the end, it's a story about power."

Alan Sepinwall wrote, "The entire sex story was masterfully handled from beginning to end. Even though I suspected NBC wasn't going to let a 15-year-old girl be deflowered on an 8 o'clock family drama, the scenes always felt honest, whether it was Saracen getting awful advice from Riggins, Smash and the guys, another hilarious Landry shopping trip, Julie revealing her inner nerd to Tyra, or Saracen's discomfort at losing it in such a terrible environment." Leah Friedman of TV Guide wrote, "Let me sum up this episode in one word: Mortified. That's pretty much how Coach and Tami reacted to Julie and Matt's decision. It also aptly describes Tim's feelings toward his father and the entire town's reaction to Tyra's mom's display of jealousy."

Brett Love of TV Squad wrote, "Overall, another really good episode. I just like the Taylors more and more with each installment. It leaves me thinking that maybe the show would have done better had it been sold on that angle. Rather than as an adaptation of that football movie, just a really good family drama." Television Without Pity gave the episode an "A–" grade.

Connie Britton submitted this episode for consideration for Outstanding Lead Actress in a Drama Series, while Aimee Teegarden submitted it for Outstanding Supporting Actress in a Drama Series, and Taylor Kitsch submitted it for Outstanding Supporting Actor in a Drama Series at the 59th Primetime Emmy Awards.
