= Crossing the Line (Friday Night Lights) =

- Friday Night Lights episode
- Episode no.: Season 1 Episode 8
- Directed by: Jeffrey Reiner
- Written by: Bridget Carpenter
- Cinematography by: David Boyd
- Editing by: Angela M. Catanzaro
- Original release date: November 28, 2006
- Running time: 43 minutes

Guest appearance
- Kevin Rankin as Herc

Episode chronology
| ← Previous "Homecoming" | Next → "Full Hearts" |
- Friday Night Lights (season 1)

"Crossing the Line" is the eighth episode of the first season of the American sports drama television series Friday Night Lights, inspired by the 1990 nonfiction book by H. G. Bissinger. The episode was written by producer Bridget Carpenter and directed by co-executive producer Jeffrey Reiner. It originally aired on NBC on November 28, 2006.

The series is set in the fictional town of Dillon, a small, close-knit community in rural West Texas. It follows a high school football team, the Dillon Panthers. It features a set of characters, primarily connected to Coach Eric Taylor, his wife Tami, and their daughter Julie. In the episode, Tim and Billy get into a heated argument, while Smash faces a dilemma when he needs money to pay for his performance enhancers.

According to Nielsen Media Research, the episode was seen by an estimated 6.18 million household viewers and gained a 2.2 ratings share among adults aged 18–49. The episode received mostly positive reviews from critics, praising the performances and focus on Tim's and Billy's relationship.

== Plot ==
While shopping food with Billy (Derek Phillips), Tim (Taylor Kitsch) runs into Tyra (Adrianne Palicki), who compliments his advances. Then, Tim and Tyra have sex in the market's warehouse. At the facility, Jason (Scott Porter) asks Lyla (Minka Kelly) about her relationship with Tim, which she denies. Lyla visits Tim to tell him about Jason's suspicions, discovering that he is now with Tyra again.

Now secretly using testosterone cypionate, Smash (Gaius Charles) improves during training. However, as it costs $300 weekly, Smash decides to apply for a job at Alamo Freeze, with the help of Matt (Zach Gilford). While Smash deviates from the customers' orders, his social skills convinces the customers in accepting his suggested orders. However, Smash is annoyed upon learning that he won't receive his salary until the end of the month, so he attempts to steal some money from the cash register, only to be caught by Matt. Smash storms out apologizing, affirming that he cannot let another mistake happen after his poor performance in the previous game. Later, Smash is dismayed upon learning that her mother told the local church about his money problems, as Smash previously asked for $1,200 by lying that it would be for a SAT course. The church wants to support Smash's career and they give him a large donation, stressing him.

Out of guilt, Lyla confesses her affair to Tami (Connie Britton). Tami consoles her, but tells her that she needs to tell Jason about it as it will "let him heal" after experiencing the worst injury of his life. Tami is surprised when Julie (Aimee Teegarden) states that Matt invited her on a date, even though she hasn't confirmed. Eric (Kyle Chandler) talks with Julie about her possible date, saying that boys only care for sex. Despite their concerns, Julie announces that she will go out with Matt.

Billy schedules a dinner with the Taylors at their house, hoping to get a proper college application for Tim. However, the dinner turns awkward when Billy and Tim argue about their father, who only sends them checks every couple of months. At their house, Tim and Billy get into a heated argument, with Billy scolding Tim for not appreciating his talent while Billy had to quit his golf career in order to raise Billy by himself. The argument escalates into a brutal fight, in which Tim walks out of the house, proclaiming that he is better living off alone.

Jason decides to participate in quad rugby, even though his condition is still not strong enough. During a talk with Herc (Kevin Rankin), Jason continues denying Lyla's infidelity, stating that she is everything he got left. After a talk with Eric, Jason begins his first game, which goes very well. When Tim congratulates him, Jason responds by punching him in the eye, calling him out on his affair with Lyla. Tim simply walks away, ashamed. He returns home, telling Billy about the incident. Billy gives him a bag and the brothers silently eat dinner, reconciling.

== Production ==
=== Development ===
In November 2006, NBC announced that the eighth episode of the season would be titled "Crossing the Line". The episode was written by producer Bridget Carpenter and directed by co-executive producer Jeffrey Reiner. This was Carpenter's first writing credit, and Reiner's third directing credit.

== Reception ==
=== Viewers ===
In its original American broadcast, "Crossing the Line" was seen by an estimated 6.18 million household viewers with a 2.2 in the 18–49 demographics. This means that 2.2 percent of all households with televisions watched the episode. It finished 69th out of 97 programs airing from November 27-December 3, 2006. This was a 12% increase in viewership from the previous episode, which was watched by an estimated 5.48 million household viewers with a 1.9 in the 18–49 demographics.

=== Critical reviews ===
"Crossing the Line" received mostly positive reviews from critics. Eric Goldman of IGN gave the episode a "great" 8 out of 10 and wrote, "This week's Friday Night Lights showed one relationship continue to blossom as others fell apart. The one that was on a positive track was Matt and Julie, who continue to be rather adorable, as he awkwardly tries to get her to go on a date, and she coyly tells him she's thinking it over. These two are the most down to Earth and earnest characters on the show, yet without coming off as saccharine sweet or too good to be true, which makes it easy to root for them."

Sonia Saraiya of The A.V. Club gave the episode an "A–" grade and wrote, "Here the intersection between pedagogy and story works well, perhaps because it's going for a much smaller scope. Billy strikes me as a very real and very identifiable character — the man who doesn't yet quite grasp how much of his opportunities have been squandered, and is terrified of confronting that reality. His character development comes from an unexpected corner, as he starts out his life in Friday Night Lights as just that guy on the couch in Tim's house. It's a welcome surprise to see him flower into more than that."

Alan Sepinwall wrote, "This wasn't one of my favorite episodes, but even when the show isn't clicking, I can always count on the family dynamics at the Taylor household to keep me engaged. I would care more about the poor, doomed Riggins brothers and the Street/Lyla/Riggins triangle if the actors playing Riggins and Lyla didn't feel better-suited to One Tree Hill, and as fair as they've tried to play Street's recovery, him participating in a Murderball scrimmage four or five weeks after he was paralyzed? Huh? I get that it's TV, and that this was around the point where the producers saw the writing on the wall and started cramming as many ideas in as they could before cancellation, but would it have killed them to wait at least until the Panthers season ended?" Leah Friedman of TV Guide wrote, "I felt emotionally walloped by this episode — more so even than by last week's homecoming. So while I can't wait till the next one, I'm certainly glad I'll have a week to recover."

Brett Love of TV Squad wrote, "Sandwiched between the big homecoming game from the last episode, and the 'toughest game of the year' in the next one, this episode managed to be great with only one brief stop at Panther practice. The characters and their story are just so good that the games don't matter. That's a good sign, because the football season seems to be moving along much faster than the television season. But there will still be plenty of story to tell when the track team takes over the field." Television Without Pity gave the episode an "A–" grade.

Scott Porter submitted this episode for consideration for Outstanding Supporting Actor in a Drama Series and Derek Phillips submitted it for Outstanding Guest Actor in a Drama Series at the 59th Primetime Emmy Awards.
