= Nevermind (Friday Night Lights) =

- Friday Night Lights episode
- Episode no.: Season 1 Episode 11
- Directed by: Jonas Pate
- Written by: Elizabeth Heldens
- Cinematography by: Todd McMullen
- Editing by: Scott Gamzon
- Original release date: January 3, 2007
- Running time: 43 minutes

Guest appearances
- Kevin Rankin as Herc; Brad Leland as Buddy Garrity

Episode chronology
← Previous "It's Different for Girls"	Next → "What to Do While You're Waiting"
- Friday Night Lights (season 1)

"Nevermind" is the eleventh episode of the first season of the American sports drama television series Friday Night Lights, inspired by the 1990 nonfiction book by H. G. Bissinger. The episode was written by supervising producer Elizabeth Heldens and directed by Jonas Pate. It originally aired on NBC on January 3, 2007.

The series is set in the fictional town of Dillon, a small, close-knit community in rural West Texas. It follows a high school football team, the Dillon Panthers. It features a set of characters, primarily connected to Coach Eric Taylor, his wife Tami, and their daughter Julie. In the episode, Matt is delighted when his father returns from Iraq, but is disappointed upon seeing the different person he became. Meanwhile, Jason and Lyla begin to rekindle their relationship, and Landry tutors an academically challenged Tim.

According to Nielsen Media Research, the episode was seen by an estimated 6.28 million household viewers and gained a 2.2 ratings share among adults aged 18–49. The episode received critical acclaim, with critics praising the performances (particularly Zach Gilford), writing, and character development.

== Plot ==
Jason (Scott Porter) is annoyed upon learning that his Nevermind CD is missing. Despite his mother's protests, he decides to go to a record store to buy a new copy, despite being four miles away. There, he grabs the CD and runs into Lyla (Minka Kelly). They share a flirtatious conversation, and then go to his house to have sex, but Jason's disability prevents him due to an erectile dysfunction.

Tami (Connie Britton) tells Tim (Taylor Kitsch) that he needs to improve his falling grades, as he will be deemed unsuitable to play for the upcoming games. She assigns Landry (Jesse Plemons) in helping Tim to pass his English class, as he needs to deliver an oral report on Of Mice and Men. Tim is uncooperative, and makes Landry read the book to him as he does not want to read. Even when he understands the plot, Tim does not open over the book's themes to his own life, causing Landry to storm off. Eric (Kyle Chandler) scolds Tim for his behavior, telling him that he needs to improve if he wants to remain in the team. Later, Tim visits Landry during a performance of his Christian metal band, Crucifictorious, telling him that he passed with a B−.

Matt (Zach Gilford) is surprised when his father, Henry (Brent Smiga), returns from Iraq for two weeks. While Henry is supportive of Matt's football career, he maintains his position that his time at Iraq is not over. Henry is also annoyed by Lorraine (Louanne Stephens), especially after she accidentally causes a small fire. They take her to the doctor, where Henry wants to send her to a new home, but he is not planning on staying to be Matt's legal guardian. He is trying to get Matt move to Oklahoma to live with his aunt, disillusioning Matt of his father's changed behavior. This causes Matt to almost cost a game for the Panthers, forcing Eric (Kyle Chandler) to replace him in order to ensure a Panthers win.

Jason asks Tami for advice about his possible reunion with Lyla, to which she says that "there is no weakness in forgiveness." That night, Lyla sneaks into his bedroom and professes her love for him, to which Jason responds by kissing her. In the aftermath of the game, Matt and Henry get into a conflict at the parking lot. Matt refuses to leave with his father and is allowed to leave with the Taylors. Matt confides in Eric that he hates his father, and Eric asks him not to commit that mistake. Matt returns home, finding Henry tending Lorraine as he puts her in the bed.

== Production ==
=== Development ===
In December 2006, NBC announced that the eleventh episode of the season would be titled "Nevermind". The episode was written by supervising producer Elizabeth Heldens and directed by Jonas Pate. This was Heldens' second writing credit, and Pate's first directing credit.

== Reception ==
=== Viewers ===
In its original American broadcast, "Nevermind" was seen by an estimated 6.28 million household viewers with a 2.2 in the 18–49 demographics. This means that 2.2 percent of all households with televisions watched the episode. It finished 72nd out of 108 programs airing from January 1–7, 2007. This was a 10% increase in viewership from the previous episode, which was watched by an estimated 5.66 million household viewers with a 2.2 in the 18–49 demographics.

=== Critical reviews ===
"Nevermind" received critical acclaim. Eric Goldman of IGN gave the episode a "great" 8.8 out of 10 and wrote, "Friday Night Lights started out the year with another terrific episode, featuring some very interesting character interactions."

Sonia Saraiya of The A.V. Club gave the episode an "A−" grade and wrote, "Friday Night Lights relies on Tim Riggins to feel for the entire show, and in that moment on the bleachers, he is feeling it all. Mrs. Coach tells Jason that there is no weakness in forgiveness. And what is forgiveness, if not re-evaluating, and changing your mind?"

Alan Sepinwall wrote, "The meat of the episode was obviously the non-triumphant return of Pa Saracen. Even with the long shot the director used on Tim hugging his dad, you could see the relief overwhelming him, the mistaken belief that his father was going to save him from this hell he had been living in." Leah Friedman of TV Guide wrote, "As much as I love these characters and will no doubt grow more attached to them over the course of the rest of the season, should the show be back for another season or seasons, as long as the new kids are as compelling as this lot, I have no problem with it. Not that I'm saying I want Matt Saracen to move to Oklahoma, where the wind comes sweepin' down the plain, or that Coach Taylor should take a job somewhere else. Just that I would expect their replacements to be every bit as human as they are — confusion, hate and all."

Brett Love of TV Squad wrote, "It's great to see a new episode, but will the move give the show a much needed ratings boost? We'll have to wait and see. They did pick a good episode to come back with though. There was a lot of good stuff going on this week." Television Without Pity gave the episode an "A+" grade.

Zach Gilford submitted this episode for consideration for Outstanding Supporting Actor in a Drama Series at the 59th Primetime Emmy Awards.
