= John Zinman =

American screen writer

John Zinman is a film and television writer and producer. He has worked on the NBC drama series Friday Night Lights. He often works with writing partner Patrick Massett. He has been nominated for four Writers Guild of America (WGA) Awards and one Primetime Emmy Award for his work on Friday Night Lights.

== Early life and education ==
He grew up in Irvington, New York, attending Irvington High School before graduating from the University of Pennsylvania in 1988.

== Career ==
He was nominated for a Writers Guild of America (WGA) Awards for Best New Series at the February 2007 ceremony for his work on the first season of Friday Night Lights. He was nominated for the WGA Award for Best Dramatic Series the following year at the February 2008 ceremony for his work on the second season of Friday Night Lights. He was nominated for Best Dramatic Series a second time at the February 2009 ceremony for his work on the third season of Friday Night Lights. He was nominated for the WGA Award for Best Drama Series for the third consecutive year at the February 2010 ceremony for his work on the fourth season.

In 2011, Friday Night Lights was nominated for Outstanding Drama Series at the 63rd Primetime Emmy Awards, netting Zinman a nomination for his role as a series producer.

John Zinman and writing partner Patrick Massett are the writers of the 2001 film Lara Croft: Tomb Raider and the 2016 film Gold. Zinman and Massett acted as producers on Gold as well.

In November 2022, Zinman and Massett wrote Wind River: The Next Chapter.

== Filmography ==
- Lara Croft: Tomb Raider (2001, screenplay)
- Gold (2016, co-writer, producer)
- Wind River: The Next Chapter (TBA, co-writer)
