= Patrick Massett =

American screenwriter and producer (born 1962)

Patrick Massett (born March 6, 1962) is an American screenwriter and producer.

He has worked on both the NBC drama series Friday Night Lights and the Syfy series Caprica. He often works with writing partner John Zinman. He has been nominated for four Writers Guild of America (WGA) Awards for his work on Friday Night Lights.

== Career ==
One of his most notable early acting roles was as the Klingon Duras, son of Ja'rod, in Star Trek: The Next Generation. He joined the crew of NBC drama series Friday Night Lights as a writer and consulting producer for the first season. He was nominated for a Writers Guild of America Award for Best New Series at the February 2007 ceremony for his work on the first season of Friday Night Lights. He was nominated for the WGA Award for Best Dramatic Series the following year at the February 2008 ceremony for his work on the second season of Friday Night Lights.

He was nominated for Best Dramatic Series a second time at the February 2009 ceremony for his work on the third season of Friday Night Lights. He was nominated for the WGA Award for Best Drama Series for the third consecutive year at the February 2010 ceremony for his work on the fourth season.

In 2007 Massett wrote and executive produced the TV film The Cure before starting work on the NBC reboot of the series Knight Rider. He served as consulting producer and writer on the series before helming the short film The Seer in 2009. In 2010 he joined the Battlestar Galactica series Caprica, serving as co-executive producer and writer for two episodes.

Massett and Zinman are the writers of the film Lara Croft: Tomb Raider.

In November 2022, Massett and Zinman wrote Wind River: The Next Chapter.

== Filmography (as writer) ==
- Lara Croft: Tomb Raider (2001, screenplay)
- Gold (2016, co-writer, producer)
