= Jae Head =

American actor (born 1996)

- Born: December 27, 1996 (age 29); Hamlin, Texas
- Occupation: Actor
- Years active: 2005–present

Jae Head (born December 27, 1996) is an American actor. He is best known for portraying Sean "S.J." Tuohy Jr. in the 2009 film The Blind Side, directed by John Lee Hancock.

== Early life ==
Head was born in Hamlin, Texas, in 1996. When he was born, he had no aorta, and blood vessels had to be adapted to temporarily replace the aorta. He had open-heart surgery at two months and again at 14 months. Over a three-year period, his pulmonary vein was converted into an aorta.

== Career ==
Head first gained popularity by playing Bo Miller, a young boy befriended by Tim Riggins on the television series Friday Night Lights. Subsequently, show creator Peter Berg cast Head in his film Hancock alongside Will Smith, Charlize Theron, and Jason Bateman. Head has also appeared in episodes of the CBS sitcom How I Met Your Mother, MADtv, and Law & Order: Special Victims Unit.

== Filmography ==
=== Film ===
Year	Title	Role	Notes
2008	Hancock	Aaron Embrey	
2009	The Blind Side	Sean "S.J." Tuohy Jr.	
2013	Robosapien: Rebooted	Cody/Robosapien	Voice role
2015	Bravetown	Tony	
2017	The Bachelors	Gober Ponder	
2018	Homeless Henry: Through the Tears	Henry	Short film
2018	Depraved	Scott	
2019	Hell Girl	Scott	

=== Television ===
Year	Title	Role	Notes
2005	How I Met Your Mother	Leroy	Episode "Purple Giraffe"
2006	Mad TV	Jimmy	Episode 18 (season 11)
2006	The Angriest Man in Suburbia	Little Chuck	Television film
2007	Friday Night Lights	Bo Miller	5 episodes (season 1)
2008	Law & Order: Special Victims Unit	Christopher Ryan	Episode: "Trials"
2019	Yellowstone	Luke Hayes	Episode: "Only Devils Left"

== Awards and nominations ==
Year	Award	Category	Nominated work	Result
2009	10th Phoenix Film Critics Society Awards	Best Performance by a Youth - Male	The Blind Side	Won
2010	15th Critics' Choice Awards	Best Young Actor/Actress	The Blind Side	Nominated
2010	31st Young Artist Awards	Best Performance in a Feature Film - Supporting Young Actor	The Blind Side	Nominated
