= Liz Heldens =

Television screenwriter and producer

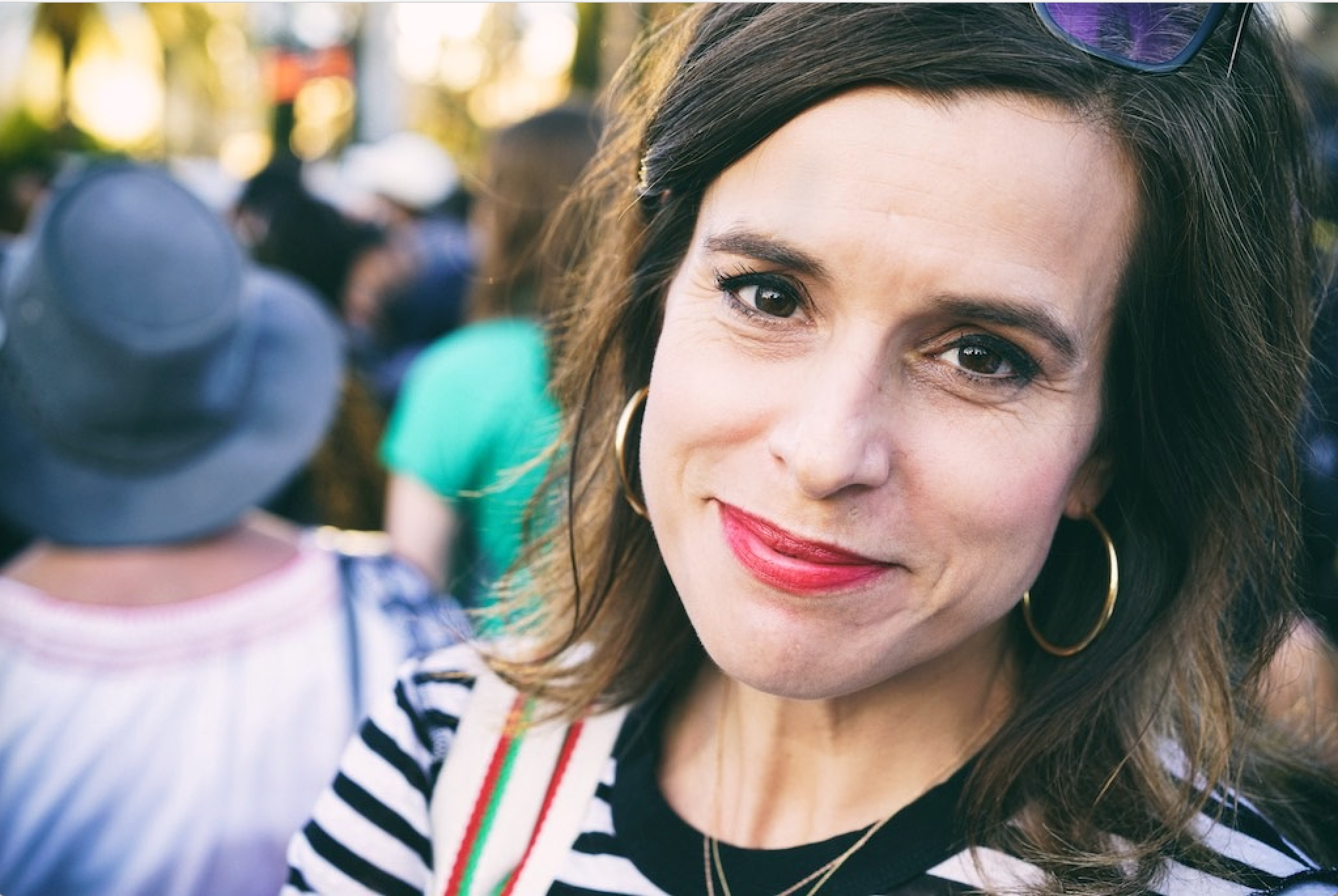
- Born: Elizabeth Heldens
- Occupations: television writer and producer
- Years active: 2000–present

Elizabeth Heldens is a television writer and producer. She is the creator of Deception, a drama on NBC which premiered on January 7, 2013. She has worked on the NBC drama series Friday Night Lights. She was nominated for a Writers Guild of America Award for Best New Series at the February 2007 ceremony for her work on the first season of Friday Night Lights. She was nominated for the WGA Award for Best Dramatic Series the following year at the February 2008 ceremony for her work on the second season of Friday Night Lights. Heldens was nominated for Best Dramatic Series a second time at the February 2009 ceremony for her work on the third season of Friday Night Lights. She was nominated for the WGA Award for Best Drama Series for the third consecutive year at the February 2010 ceremony for her work on the fourth season. Her production company is Selfish Mermaid.

Helden's other television credits include Boston Public, Pepper Dennis, North Shore, The Orville, The Dropout, Bionic Woman, Deception, Camp, The Passage, The Big Leap and Mercy, a series she created.

She's currently the co-showrunner of the ABC drama series Will Trent.
