= Aasha Davis =

American actress

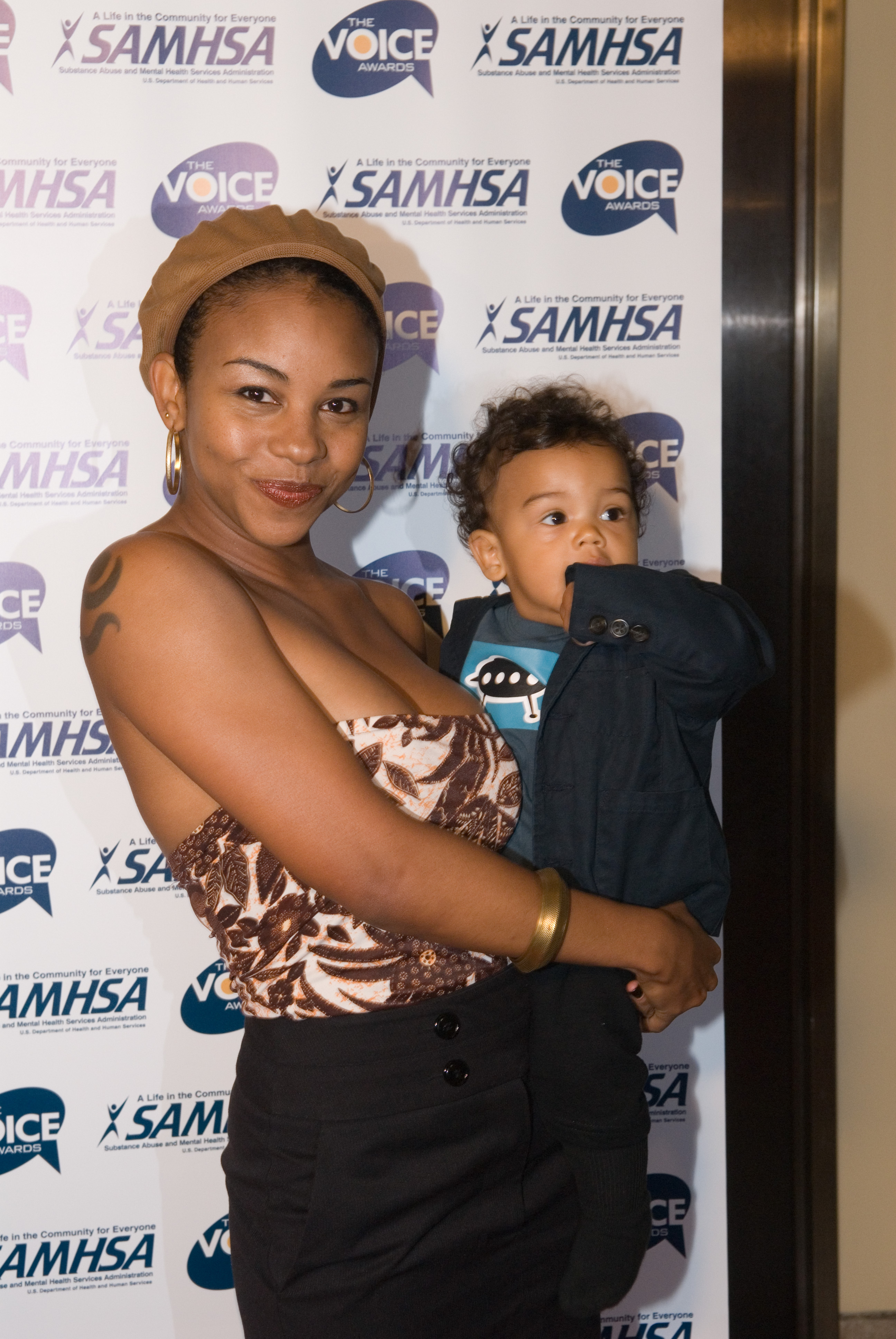
- 2009 Voice Awards: Aasha Davis
- Occupation: Actress
- Years active: 2002–present

Aasha Davis is an American actress known for her numerous roles on the Comedy Central educational comedy series Drunk History (2014–2019), as Waverly Grady on NBC sports drama Friday Night Lights (2006–2007), and as Chelsea Lewis on The N teen drama South of Nowhere (2005–2008). She also starred as Bina in the 2011 drama film Pariah.

== Career ==
Davis is best known for playing the role of Waverly Grady on Friday Night Lights. Davis was featured in Gnarls Barkley's music video in 2008 called "Who's Gonna Save My Soul". She has also appeared in Gilmore Girls, Grey's Anatomy, House, ER, Castle, and The Shield.

In 2011, she played opposite Adepero Oduye in the film Pariah.

In 2012, she guest-starred in the second season of the Jane Espenson-scripted romantic comedy web series Husbands.

In 2013, Aasha is produced, starred in, and directed an episode of the web series featured on YouTube called The Unwritten Rules, which is based on series creator Kim Williams's book 40 Hours and an Unwritten Rule: The Diary of an African-American Woman.

In 2019, Aasha starred as Bernadette in the rural Louisiana murder mystery The Long Shadow.

== Personal life ==
Davis's older sister, Lesley Herring, disappeared in Los Angeles on February 8, 2009, after a fight with her husband, Lyle Stanford Herring, Sr. Davis reported her sister as missing when she failed to show up to work, her husband having neglected to do so. Lyle Herring was charged with his wife's murder and in April 2010 pleaded not guilty. On April 8, 2013, he was convicted of the second-degree murder of his wife. To date, her body has not been found. A 2011 episode of Nancy Grace and a June 7, 2013, episode of Dateline NBC covered Davis's sister's case.

== Filmography ==
=== Film ===
Year	Title	Role	Notes
2002	Bittersweet Lies	Ally	
2011	Pariah	Bina	
2014	The Last Beat	Nan	Pre-production
2015	Kindred Kill	Pansy Jones	Pre-production

=== Television ===
Year	Title	Role	Notes
2002	Scratch & Burn	Sheera	Episode: "X-Box"
2003–2004	Gilmore Girls	Susan	2 episodes
2005	The Shield	Lucy	Episode: "Grave"
2005	Over There	Michelle	Episode: "Roadblock Duty"
2005	ER	Maureen	Episode: "I Do"
2005–2008	South of Nowhere	Chelsea Lewis	(35 episodes)
2006	House	Leona	Episode: "Who's Your Daddy?"
2006–2007	Friday Night Lights	Waverly Grady	Recurring role (8 episodes)
2007	Grey's Anatomy	Rina	Episodes: "Testing 1-2-3", "Didn't We Almost Have It All?"
2009	Raising the Bar	Shauna Larkin	Episode: "Maybe, Baby"
2011	Castle	Alyssa Lofters	Episode: "Eye of the Beholder"
2012–2014	The Unwritten Rules	Racey Jones	Regular role (23 episodes)
2013	Cowgirl Up	Robbie	Regular role (6 episodes)
2013	Nikki & Nora: The N&N Files	Violet Craig	TV film
2013	Ctrl.Alt.Del	Marcy	Episodes: "Sista Sista", "Do You See What I See?"
2014	Criminal Minds	Daria Samsen	Episode: "The Edge of Winter"
2014–2019	Drunk History	Various	Regular role (22 episodes)
2017	Bones	Kate Dalton	Episode: "The Brain in the Bot"
2021	I Think You Should Leave	Lisa	Episode: “Everyone just needs to be more in the moment.”
