= Tyra Collette =

Character in TV series Friday Night Lights

- Friday Night Lights character
- First appearance: "Pilot" (episode 1.01)
- Last appearance: "Always" (episode 5.13)
- Portrayed by: Adrianne Palicki

In-universe information
- Occupation: Waitress and High School Student (seasons 1–3); College Student at University of Texas (season 4–present)
- Family: Angela Collette (mother); Mindy Collette-Riggins (sister); Billy Riggins (brother-in-law); Steven Riggins (nephew); Twins (nieces/nephews; ambiguous)
- Significant others: Tim Riggins (ex-boyfriend); Landry Clarke (ex-boyfriend); Cash (ex-boyfriend)

Tyra Collette is a character in the NBC/DirecTV drama Friday Night Lights, portrayed by actress Adrianne Palicki.

== Character biography ==
Tyra is a resident of the fictional Dillon, Texas. She works at Applebee's and lives with her mother and older sister, who is a stripper. Little is known about her absent father. Initially the girlfriend of Tim Riggins, she spends most of the series actively hating Dillon, Texas and everything about it, trying to get a way out of them. She eventually succeeds at the end of season three when she is accepted at the University of Texas, which she starts attending at the beginning of season four and is still attending at the end of the series.

=== Season one ===
At the beginning of season one, Tyra is dating Tim Riggins despite publicly flirting with Brian "Smash" Williams. She eventually dumps Tim, but is still devastated when she learns he slept with his best friend's girlfriend, Lyla Garrity.

After witnessing her mother's abuse at the hands of her boyfriend, Tyra encourages her mother to get a job and become independent. She secures an interview for her mother through Tim, who calls in a favor with Buddy Garrity. However, her mother and Buddy begin an affair and her mother is let go from her job when Buddy decides to end the affair.

Tyra also strikes up a friendship with Julie Taylor. While the Taylors initially object to the friendship because Tyra's sister, Mindy, is a stripper and they fear Tyra is a bad influence, Tami Taylor changes her mind after she sees Tyra cleaning up after her drunk mother. Tami encourages Tyra to focus on school and getting into college.

Tyra is assaulted by a stranger while waiting to meet Landry Clarke to study. She asks Landry to keep the assault a secret, trying to minimize its severity. However, encouraged by Matt to tell someone, Landry goes to Tami Taylor, who in turn convinces Tyra to file a police report. She is severely shaken after the attempted rape and becomes much closer to Landry.

=== Season two ===
In season two, Tyra is stalked and attacked for a second time by the same man in season one. Landry kills her attempted rapist and the two dispose of the body together after first attempting to save him. For a while, the two are constantly nervous and scared that the police will discover the body and they will go to jail. They begin a brief relationship, though Tyra eventually leaves him at the request of Landry's father, a town police officer, after the police decide not to bring charges against Landry. Tyra remains confused by the intensity of her feelings for Landry, keeping him at arm's length until another girl shows interest in him. In that moment, she realizes she really wants to be with him and asks him to be together. The two eventually start dating.

=== Season three ===
In season three, Tyra becomes dispirited after learning that despite the hard work she put into her last two years of school, her GPA is still too low to get her into most colleges. She and Landry have broken up at some point between seasons for unknown reasons, but remain still very close. Tyra spends most of the season alternating between thinking that her situation is hopeless and trying hard to remain on top of her academic career. She eventually runs off for a few weeks with a cowboy named Cash. In Dallas, he turns abusive after she discovers he has a gambling problem.

After refocusing on her education, she is wait-listed at the University of Texas and is eventually offered a place there. She ends the season in a relationship with Landry after they reconnect after he helps her with her SATs. While thinking of what to write for her college essay, she confesses to Landry that she has been angry and bitter over her dysfunctional family life and "had enough hate in my heart to start a freaking car". Her perception changed after watching Jason Street, the Panthers' "All-American" golden boy who has everything Tyra does not – loving parents, close friends, and the chance to go to college – lose his dreams of playing college football in a single play and it makes her realize that life "isn't fair for anybody" regardless of background and status.

=== Season four ===
Tyra is absent in season four, presumably being in college. She is mentioned by Landry briefly in one episode when she fails to meet him at their designated meeting spot, when he decides to completely give up on a relationship with her.

=== Season five ===
Tyra spends most of season five in college and visits Dillon near the end of the season to help out Mindy and her mother with Stevie and the impending twins. She drops in on Tim, who is now working at Buddy's, much to his delight. They talk about possibly resuming their relationship and, during her last scene, she tells him that "she's been in love with him since they were five years old”, which Tim seems to acknowledge. However, they both recognize they have very different lives as she is moving forward with her studies, has big plans for her future and no intention to put it all aside to get back together with him, while Tim states he finally wants to get his life together and stay living in Dillon. They simply agree that maybe one day their paths could reunite. Tyra also reconnects with Julie Taylor; she and Tim celebrate Julie's engagement to Matt Saracen.
