= Lyla Garrity =

Fictional character in TV series Friday Night Lights

- First appearance: "Pilot" (episode 1.01)
- Last appearance: "Stay" (episode 4.06)
- Portrayed by: Minka Kelly

In-universe information
- Occupation: College student at Vanderbilt University
- Family: Buddy Garrity (father); Pam Garrity (mother); Tabitha "Tabby" Garrity (sister); Buddy Jr. (brother); Kevin (step-father); Gary Garrity (uncle)

Lyla Garrity is a fictional character, portrayed by Minka Kelly, in the sports drama television series Friday Night Lights. She is the daughter of Buddy Garrity and Pam Garrity. She is the former girlfriend of Jason Street and Tim Riggins.

== Characterization and background ==
Lyla is portrayed as an "All-American" golden girl with a seemingly perfect family. The oldest of three children, she has a younger sister, Tabby, and younger brother, Buddy, Jr. She is good-natured, compassionate, academic-outstanding, popular and at the beginning of the series was the girlfriend of the star quarterback Jason Street. When her family turned out to be nothing but perfect as it initially seemed due to her parents’ divorce, she came to question almost everything in her life, leading her to quit the cheerleading quad which she was the captain of and grow closer to her Christian faith.

During much of the show, she used to be frequently seen around Tim and Jason, both of whom she was close friends with since childhood. However, the dynamic between the three of them turned out to be also pretty complicated. In fact, her relationship with Jason started to fall apart after his injury and reached its lowest point after she cheated on him with Tim, who also had realized he was in love with her. When Jason found out the truth, things became tense between the three of them, but eventually he managed to forgive both Tim and Lyla. However, things turned out be irreparable in her and Jason’s relationship as the two kept growing apart even after reconciling until they split up for good, but by season three, they were on friendly terms, as she was the first person he confided in about wanting to move to New York City. On the other hand, she accepted she had fallen for Tim and, having made peace with Jason, decided to start a relationship with him.

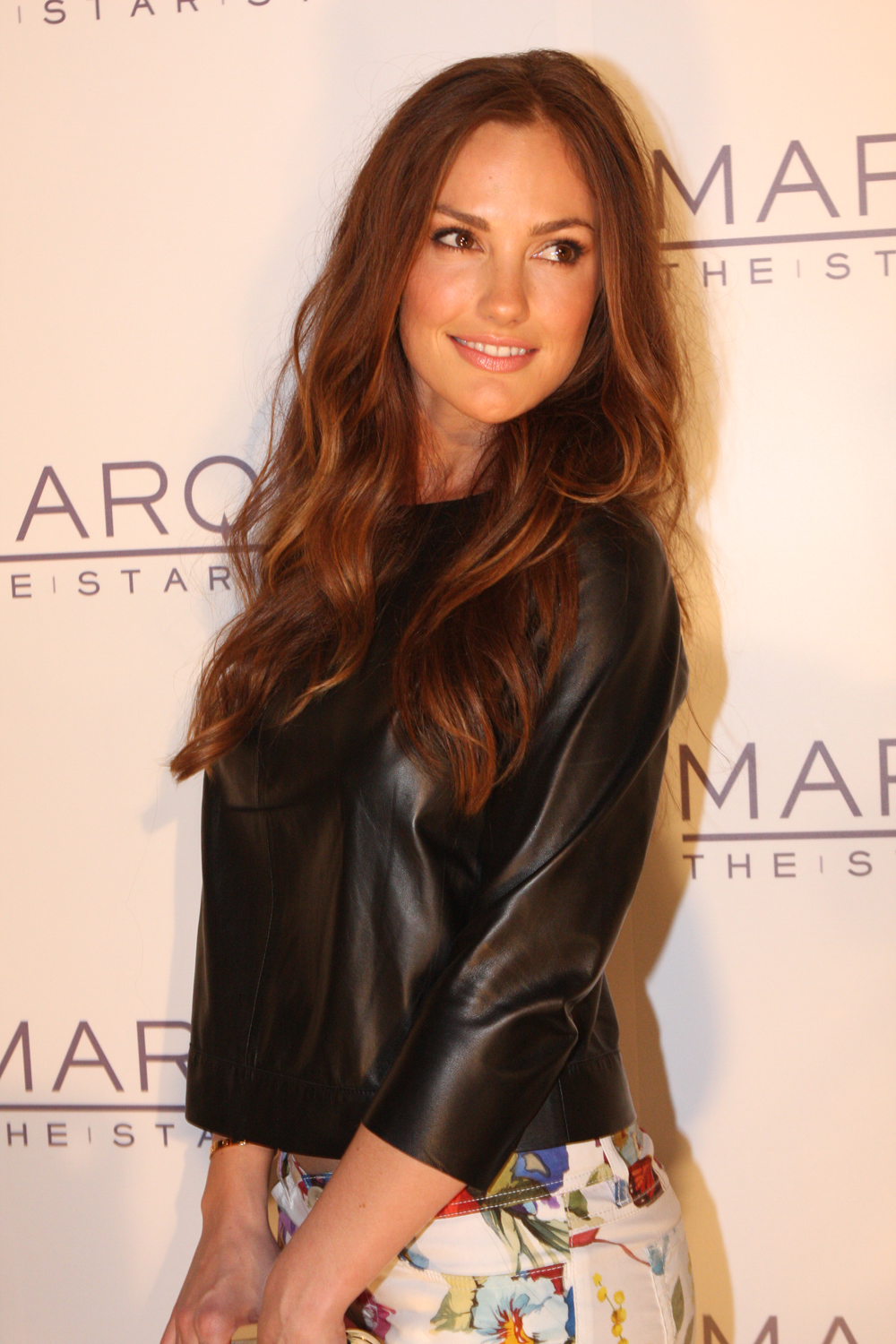
The character is portrayed by Minka Kelly

== Storylines ==
=== Season 1 ===
In the pilot episode, Lyla is introduced as the girlfriend of star quarterback, Jason Street. After Jason's accident, she cheats on him with Riggins, his best friend, while Jason is in the hospital. Jason find out about the affair and confronts both Lyla and Riggins. For some time, the relationship between her and Jason is strained, but they get back together as he admits that he still loves her despite everything that happened and even proposes to her. Her parents' messy divorce and her father's affair being made public takes a toll on her and, during the father-daughter dance, she takes out her anger at her father's infidelity by vandalizing her father's car dealership and the cars on sale. Her troubles are exacerbated when she catches Jason with a woman he met while training for the Olympic trials in Austin and breaks off the engagement, ending their relationship for good. She eventually quits the cheerleading squad after being incessantly ridiculed by her peers at school and does some soul-searching.

=== Season 2 ===
In the season premiere, Lyla becomes a devout Christian. She is baptized in the first episode of the season and becomes involved in various ministries such as a Christian radio show and prison ministry. At the radio station, she meets a devout young man who also attends her church, Chris (Matt Czuchry), and they begin dating. While on a visit to juvenile detention, she meets the gruff but polite, Santiago. She learns that he was born on American soil but his parents, being illegal immigrants, were deported back to Mexico several years ago and that he lives with his relatives. She convinces her father to offer Santiago a job at the car dealership. Buddy later recommends him to Coach Taylor and Santiago tries out for the Panthers football team with some help from Tim, Matt Saracen, and Brian "Smash" Williams.

Meanwhile, Jason and Tim have gone to Mexico because Jason wants to try an experimental procedure in hopes of regaining use of his legs. Lyla comes to Mexico at Tim's request. The three go on a “booze cruise “ where Tim and Lyla plan to talk Jason out of the operation. Jason intentionally falls out of the boat, but swims safely to a beach. Lyla and Tim meet him at the beach and the three return to Dillon.

After a while, Tim finally confesses to Lyla that he is in love with her, but she rejects him, stating that there can never be anything serious between them and also she is now happy with Chris. However, Tim keeps pursuing her, trying to win her over.

=== Season 3 ===
Lyla is now a senior and begins to plan for her future. Her relationship with Chris is seemingly ended at some point between seasons as he is never brought up again. On the other hand, having made peace with Jason, she and Tim reconnect romantically and start a real relationship after Tim states he wants to seriously commit to her and try to make it work, finally convincing Lyla to give him a chance. She fights with Buddy after he loses her college fund money in a bad business deal, even living with Tim for a while, but they eventually reconcile as Buddy finds a way to let her afford college anyway. At the end of the season, she leaves Dillon for Nashville to attend Vanderbilt University, even though this means painfully separating from Tim.

The character was written out of the show after this season as actress Minka Kelly departed from the main cast for other acting opportunities.

=== Season 4 ===
Lyla returns to Dillon and attends the funeral of Matt's father. She reunites briefly with Tim as they both are still in love with each other, but he eventually realizes that asking her to stay would mean holding her back. They tearfully part ways again as Lyla boards a bus back to Vanderbilt. This is Minka Kelly's final appearance in the show.
