= Smash Williams =

Fictional character in TV series Friday Night Lights

Brian "Smash" Williams
- Friday Night Lights character
- Gaius Charles as Smash Williams
- First appearance: "Pilot"
- Last appearance: "Hello, Goodbye"
- Portrayed by: Gaius Charles

In-universe information
- Occupation: Former running back of the Dillon Panthers; Current running back for Texas A&M University
- Family: Michael Williams (Father, deceased); Corinna Williams (Mother); Sheila Williams (Sister); Noannie Williams (Sister)
- Significant others: Waverly Grady (ex-girlfriend); Noelle Davenport (ex-girlfriend)

Brian "Smash" Williams is a fictional character in the NBC/DirecTV (The 101 Network) drama television series Friday Night Lights portrayed by actor Gaius Charles. He is the starting running back of the Dillon High School Panthers. Considered the most talented player on the roster after quarterback Jason Street, Smash received his nickname from his father after hitting a water heater. Smash is believed to be based on Boobie Miles from the Friday Night Lights book and film.

Williams is shown to be a jock in the beginning of the show. He starts a feud with fullback Tim Riggins, after having sex with Riggins' girlfriend Tyra Collette. After being caught taking performance-enhancing drugs, Smash begins a more mature approach to life, taking QB Matt Saracen under his wing, building a friendship with Riggins and leading the team after the devastating injury to Jason Street.

== Characterization and background ==
Brian "Smash" Williams was born in Gatling, Texas – a fictional, predominantly Black, crime-ridden town – in the late 1980s to Michael and Corinna Williams. He grew up there before moving to Dillon, Texas after his father Michael was killed in a car accident with another woman in 1999.

Smash is portrayed as a stereotypical jock – flashy on the field and loud-mouthed off it. He thrives in the limelight and lives for the attention, constantly referring to himself in third person ("The Smash"), which both amuses and irritates his peers. He naturally assumes the role of team co-captain after Jason Street is carried off the field after being hit in the series premiere. In the hallways, he is often seen chatting with cheerleaders and is usually surrounded by friends and fellow Panthers players. Under his happy-go-lucky and sometimes brash exterior, Smash is a loyal and caring individual who tries hard to please everyone, particularly Coach Taylor, his (ex) girlfriend Waverly and mother Corinna. In season 1, he is repeatedly worried about his mother and his future, once describing himself as the family's "meal ticket" and often reminding his mother of his promise to buy her a house after playing college football and eventually going pro. Unfortunately, his desire to go into professional football as a way to lift his family out of poverty leads to his using performance-enhancing drugs, after a renowned talent scout omits him from a list of promising prospects and criticizes his size and strength. He finds himself in a moral dilemma, including lying to obtain money for the drugs, until Corinna's discovery of the drugs forces him to confess to using them. Over the remainder of his time on the show, Smash does not return to using performance-enhancing drugs. He learns to become more of a team player and support to his teammates, and to trust Coach Taylor - who eventually comes to work with Smash to ensure he can still achieve his dreams.

== Storylines ==
=== Season 1 ===
At the start of the season, Smash is introduced as one of the star players in the Dillon Panthers offense, alongside highly rated senior quarterback Jason Street. Though a skilled player, he has an off-day at the worst time imaginable during Homecoming Week, when a renowned football scout is in the audience. Desperate to be a top-100 recruit in the nation, Smash turns to steroids and wins the next game for the team. However, when his mother discovers the drugs she assumes that Coach Taylor is behind it and accidentally reveals his indiscretion when she accuses the coach. Coach Taylor is furious as he knew nothing about it, and Smash owns up as he respected Taylor as a mentor and father figure. For a time Smash's future is in doubt, but eventually Taylor allows him back on the team provided he takes regular drug tests.

After assistant coach Mac McGill makes controversial comments regarding the abilities of black football players to the press, Smash is at first accepting of his apology. However, discussions with the other black players leads him to become very offended at the comments, and he convinces all the black players to sit out of every game until Mac is fired. However, after his mother tells him to be more careful about picking his battles, he relents and plays in the next game. At the following playoff game against Dunston Valley Cardinals, Smash and the black players face overt and explicit racism from an all-white football team who were involved in the hazing of a player in blackface and the Cardinals don't act differently towards the Panthers' black players. During the game, they are the subject of numerous taunts, corrupt officials and dirty hits leading to a brawl (instigated surprisingly enough by Tim Riggins at Smash's defense over a late hit followed by a racist remark from a Cardinals' Player) that ends the game in a Panthers victory. On the ride home, the team bus is pulled over by local officers who tell the coaches to hand over Smash for a trumped up charge of assault stemming from the last play of the game, but Mac steps up and refuses to let them on the bus without a warrant, resulting in Smash and Mac's reconciliation.

At the state championship Smash's former teammate "Voodoo" Tatum, now on the opposing team, offers to let Smash transfer so they can be the same formidable duo again. Smash declines, his loyalty to the Panthers having grown over the season. In the game, Smash gets injured after scoring a touchdown, but returns in time to make a last-second score with no time remaining to complete a Panther comeback to win the state championship. When Coach Taylor visits the school after possibly taking a job at fictional Texas Methodist University, Smash leads the other players in a chant of the team's motto "Clear eyes, full hearts, can't lose," showing they still have respect for him.

=== Season 2 ===
In his senior year, Smash is made the centerpiece of the Panthers offense under the new coach after Eric Taylor's departure to TMU. Despite the team's struggles, Smash shows little concern outside of his personal performance, which enrages the rest of the Panthers. When confronted by quarterback Matt Saracen to try a team-first approach to the game, Smash responds that this year will determine the rest of his life and that he's enjoying the attention. When Coach Taylor returns, tensions between Smash and Saracen come to a head, but after winning a close game at home, things revert to normal.

Late in the season, recruiting period begins in college football and Smash is courted by scouts from the University of Alabama and the fictional TMU, University of Miami Southern and Oklahoma Tech. He eventually gives a verbal commitment to TMU, calling it his 'dream.' This brief period of happiness is shattered when Smash gets upset and retaliates against a group of racist white teenagers who were making inappropriate remarks at his sister and Smash's white girlfriend, Noelle, in a movie theater. Coach Taylor forces him to apologize, but Smash erupts after seeing his televised apology to members of the local media. The school board decides to suspend Williams for three games (the rest of the regular season), with the Dillon High on the brink of the playoffs. Before the Panthers' first game without him, Smash gives a stirring pre-game speech in the locker room to Coach Taylor's approval. Afterwards, Smash breaks down crying.

In the season 2 finale "May the Best Man Win," it is revealed that TMU has revoked its scholarship offer to Smash, as have most Division I schools such as Texas A&M and University of Alabama. With only a few colleges still willing to accept him, Eric Taylor directs him to Whitmore, a HBCU whose coach, Deeks, has followed Smash's career since his 6th grade year. With the opportunity to transfer to a D-1 school in two years, Williams gives Deeks his verbal commitment.

=== Season 3 ===
In the premiere "I Knew You When," it is revealed that the Panthers made it to the playoffs, only to lose because of a knee injury to Smash. As a result, the scholarship he previously received from Whitmore is revoked and he begins working full-time at the Alamo Freeze. With Coach Taylor's help and will to see him succeed, Smash trains hard and receives a walk-on tryout for Texas A&M University, resulting in an offer to join the team. Smash accepts and makes his final appearance in the episode "Hello, Goodbye." Buddy later mentions in "Tomorrow Blues" to a potential recruit that Smash is performing well there.

=== Season 4 ===
In episode 5 of season 4, "The Son," Smash is mentioned by a TV commentator as doing well at Texas A&M. Meanwhile, Coach Taylor watches with pride.

=== Season 5 ===
In "The March" Tim Riggins sees Smash on TV doing well in a football game as he looks on with pride while working at Buddy's. In "On the Outside Looking In" Smash is mentioned while Julie talks with her Professor.
