= Backfire (Friday Night Lights) =

- Friday Night Lights episode
- Episode no.: Season 2 Episode 4
- Directed by: Jonas Pate
- Written by: David Hudgins
- Cinematography by: Todd McMullen
- Editing by: Louise A. Innes
- Original release date: October 26, 2007
- Running time: 43 minutes

Guest appearances
- Glenn Morshower as Chad Clarke; Chris Mulkey as Coach Bill McGregor; Brad Leland as Buddy Garrity; Benny Ciaramello as Santiago Herrera; Dana Wheeler-Nicholson as Angela Collette; Daniella Alonso as Carlotta Alonso

Episode chronology
← Previous "Are You Ready for Friday Night?"	Next → "Let's Get It On"
- Friday Night Lights (season 2)

"Backfire" is the fourth episode of the second season of the American sports drama television series Friday Night Lights, inspired by the 1990 nonfiction book by H. G. Bissinger. It is the 26th overall episode of the series and was written by supervising producer David Hudgins and directed by Jonas Pate. It originally aired on NBC on October 26, 2007.

The series is set in the fictional town of Dillon, a small, close-knit community in rural West Texas. It follows a high school football team, the Dillon Panthers. It features a set of characters, primarily connected to Coach Eric Taylor, his wife Tami, and their daughter Julie. In the episode, Buddy convinces the board in firing Coach McGregor, but the aftermath proves to be a challenge for Eric. Meanwhile, Tim and Jason arrive in Mexico, Lyla tries to help a parolee in his life, and Landry and Tyra worry when the body is found.

According to Nielsen Media Research, the episode was seen by an estimated 5.81 million household viewers and gained a 2.0 ratings share among adults aged 18–49. The episode received generally positive reviews from critics, although some were unconvinced by the closure to some of the storylines.

== Plot ==
Jason (Scott Porter) and Tim (Taylor Kitsch) arrive in Mexico, but Jason is disappointed when the doctor at the facility won't arrive until a few days later. Meanwhile, the Panthers lose a game against the Westcott Warriors, as McGregor (Chris Mulkey) makes the team rely on the same play with Smash (Gaius Charles). Buddy (Brad Leland) convinces the committee on firing McGregor.

Eric (Kyle Chandler) gets his TMU contract terminated, and returns to Dillon, reuniting with Tami (Connie Britton), Julie (Aimee Teegarden) and Gracie. However, Buddy surprises him by saying that McGregor does not plan to sign contracts and has contacted a lawyer, infuriating Eric as he has no job nor can apply for another college job for two years. Eric and Tami are trying to teach Julie how to drive, which she is struggling with. During a visit to the Swede (Shakey Graves), Julie breaks down and goes home, having decided that she does not want to spend her life with him. During a meeting, Buddy convinces the board that McGregor is unsuitable, and Eric is allowed to be back as the Panthers' coach.

As part of the church service, Lyla (Minka Kelly) holds a counseling session at prison, but the inmates mock her and question her faith. As she leaves, she decides to give a ride home to Santiago Herrera (Benny Ciaramello), a recently paroled convict who was jailed for selling marijuana. Lyla decides to establish a friendship with him, despite her mother's protests. She convinces Buddy in arranging for Santiago to get a job at his dealership. Meanwhile, Landry (Jesse Plemons) is alarmed when Chad (Glenn Morshower) is called to investigate the recovery of the corpse, and questions if he should turn himself in, which Tyra (Adrianne Palicki) convinces him in not doing.

Tim is bored by having to spend time in the motel, and he decides to take Jason out on the street. As they argue, they are stopped by a police officer for drinking and asks for their IDs. Tim tries to bribe the officer, causing him to get arrested and bailed out by Jason. When the doctor arrives, he tells Jason that the treatment involves getting injected with shark's blood, and Tim questions the treatment. That night, they get drunk and go to sing karaoke at a bar, where Jason opens up about his surgery and belief that he will walk again. Tim calls Lyla for help, as he worries Jason's life could be impacted even more, asking her to come to Mexico.

Tyra is called by the police over the corpse. She confirms the man tried to rape her, and Angela (Dana Wheeler-Nicholson) is in shock that she never said it to her. The officer thanks her for her testimony, as the man was wanted for rape in two other states. Eric is visited at home by McGregor, accusing him of being involved in the firing. He tells him he "screwed" a family man, and promises to see him again. The following day, Eric returns to coach the Panthers.

== Production ==
=== Development ===
In October 2007, NBC announced that the fourth episode of the season would be titled "Backfire". The episode was written by supervising producer David Hudgins and directed by Jonas Pate. This was Hudgins' fourth writing credit, and Pate's second directing credit.

== Reception ==
=== Viewers ===
In its original American broadcast, "Backfire" was seen by an estimated 5.81 million household viewers with a 2.0 in the 18–49 demographics. This means that 2.0 percent of all households with televisions watched the episode. It finished 76th out of 97 programs airing from October 22–28, 2007. This was a 8% increase in viewership from the previous episode, which was watched by an estimated 5.37 million household viewers with a 1.9 in the 18–49 demographics.

=== Critical reviews ===
"Backfire" received generally positive reviews from critics. Eric Goldman of IGN gave the episode a "good" 7.2 out of 10 and wrote, "Friday Night Lights has shown that the most involving stories can be the most mundane. Why throw in stalkers, murder, cover ups and promises of revenge into something that was already working so well on a much smaller scale? Next week's the first with Eric back in town the entire time."

Scott Tobias of The A.V. Club gave the episode a "B" grade and wrote, "Another good-not-great episode for me tonight overall. I keep having to remind myself that Friday Night Lights is about life in a football-obsessed small town, because its eye hasn't been on the ball lately. Having Coach Taylor back goes some distance in setting things right in the FNL universe, but we're not all the way there yet, and I'm finding myself getting a little impatient."

Alan Sepinwall wrote, "'Backfire' was a definite 'Do the ends justify the means?' kind of episode, as the producers appeared to shut down a number of storylines that weren't working, but in a far more abrupt manner than they could or should have." Leah Friedman of TV Guide wrote, "Who didn't have a little flutter in his (or her) heart when Coach Taylor, back in his Dillon Panther blues, stood up in front of that room like nothing had changed and said, "Let's go. Let's have some fun today"? What a way to end an episode that already just seemed to fly by."

Andrew Johnston of Slant Magazine wrote, "While not one of FNL's strongest-ever episodes, it still had a lot of what made me and others fall in love with the series and shows that while some unpopular storylines are still in play, the writers nonetheless have a firm hand on the rudder and know where they're going." Brett Love of TV Squad wrote, "So, after week four where does that leave us? In a good spot I think. Quick or not, having Eric back in Dillon is a great thing. His presence offers hope to the town, the team, and the viewers. It's also nice to see at least the beginnings of a resolution to the murder. For me, that has clearly been the worst decision the powers that be have made for this show since the pilot, so it's nice to look at moving on." Television Without Pity gave the episode a "B+" grade.
