= List of awards and nominations received by Friday Night Lights =

This is the list of awards and nominations received by the television series Friday Night Lights (2006–2011).

== Awards and nominations ==
Awards and nominations received by Friday Night Lights
Award	Year	Category	Nominee(s)	Result	Ref.
American Cinema Editors Awards	2007	Best Edited One-Hour Series for Commercial Television	Conrad M. Gonzalez, Keith Henderson, and Stephen Michael (for "Pilot")	Won	
American Cinema Editors Awards	2011	Best Edited One-Hour Series for Commercial Television	Mark Conte (for "I Can't")	Nominated	
American Cinema Editors Awards	2012	Best Edited One-Hour Series for Commercial Television	Angela M. Catanzaro (for "Always")	Nominated	
American Film Institute Awards	2006	TV Programs of the Year	Friday Night Lights	Won	
American Film Institute Awards	2007	TV Programs of the Year	Friday Night Lights	Won	
American Film Institute Awards	2009	TV Programs of the Year	Friday Night Lights	Won	
Artios Awards	2007	Best Dramatic Pilot Casting	Linda Lowy	Nominated	
Artios Awards	2009	Outstanding Achievement in Casting – Television Series – Drama	Linda Lowy	Nominated	
Critics' Choice Television Awards	2011	Best Drama Series	Friday Night Lights	Nominated	
Critics' Choice Television Awards	2011	Best Actor in a Drama Series	Kyle Chandler	Nominated	
Critics' Choice Television Awards	2011	Best Actress in a Drama Series	Connie Britton	Nominated	
Directors Guild of America Awards	2011	Dramatic Series	Michael Waxman (for "Always")	Nominated	
Humanitas Prizes	2009	60 Minute Category	Jason Katims (for "Tomorrow Blues")	Won	
Humanitas Prizes	2011	60 Minute Category	Jason Katims (for "Always")	Won	
NAACP Image Awards	2007	Outstanding Writing in a Dramatic Series	Aaron Rahsaan Thomas (for "Full Hearts")	Nominated	
NAACP Image Awards	2008	Outstanding Directing in a Drama Series	Seith Mann (for "Are You Ready for Friday Night?")	Won	
NAACP Image Awards	2009	Outstanding Writing in a Dramatic Series	Aaron Rahsaan Thomas (for "Leave No One Behind")	Nominated	
NAACP Image Awards	2010	Outstanding Supporting Actress in a Drama Series	Jurnee Smollett	Nominated	
NAACP Image Awards	2011	Outstanding Directing in a Drama Series	Seith Mann (for "Injury List")	Nominated	
NAMIC Vision Awards	2011	Best Drama	Friday Night Lights	Nominated	
Peabody Awards	2007	Broadcast Excellence	Friday Night Lights	Won	
People's Choice Awards	2008	Favorite Song from a Soundtrack	The Killers (for "Read My Mind")	Nominated	
Primetime Emmy Awards	2007	Outstanding Directing for a Drama Series	Peter Berg (for "Pilot")	Nominated	
Primetime Emmy Awards	2010	Outstanding Lead Actor in a Drama Series	Kyle Chandler	Nominated	
Primetime Emmy Awards	2010	Outstanding Lead Actress in a Drama Series	Connie Britton	Nominated	
Primetime Emmy Awards	2010	Outstanding Writing for a Drama Series	Rolin Jones (for "The Son")	Nominated	
Primetime Emmy Awards	2011	Outstanding Drama Series	Friday Night Lights	Nominated	
Primetime Emmy Awards	2011	Outstanding Lead Actor in a Drama Series	Kyle Chandler	Won	
Primetime Emmy Awards	2011	Outstanding Lead Actress in a Drama Series	Connie Britton	Nominated	
Primetime Emmy Awards	2011	Outstanding Writing for a Drama Series	Jason Katims (for "Always")	Won	
Primetime Creative Arts Emmy Awards	2007	Outstanding Casting for a Drama Series	Linda Lowy, John Brace, and Beth Sepko	Won	
Primetime Creative Arts Emmy Awards	2008	Outstanding Casting for a Drama Series	Linda Lowy, John Brace, and Beth Sepko	Nominated	
Primetime Creative Arts Emmy Awards	2008	Outstanding Special Class – Short-Format Live-Action Entertainment Programs	Carole Panick, Howard Borim, and Kanae Talbot (for Friday Night Lights: Spotlight on Austin)	Nominated	
Primetime Creative Arts Emmy Awards	2009	Outstanding Casting for a Drama Series	Linda Lowy, John Brace, and Beth Sepko	Nominated	
Primetime Creative Arts Emmy Awards	2010	Outstanding Casting for a Drama Series	Linda Lowy, John Brace, and Beth Sepko	Nominated	
EWwy Awards	2010	Best Drama Series	Friday Night Lights	Nominated	
EWwy Awards	2010	Best Supporting Actor in a Drama	Zach Gilford	Nominated	
EWwy Awards	2011	Best Supporting Actor in a Drama	Michael B. Jordan	Nominated	
Satellite Awards	2007	Best Television Series, Drama	Friday Night Lights	Nominated	
Satellite Awards	2010	Best Television Series, Drama	Friday Night Lights	Nominated	
Satellite Awards	2010	Best Actor in a Series, Drama	Kyle Chandler	Nominated	
Satellite Awards	2010	Best Actress in a Series, Drama	Connie Britton	Won	
Satellite Awards	2011	Best Television Series, Drama	Friday Night Lights	Nominated	
Satellite Awards	2011	Best Actor in a Series, Drama	Kyle Chandler	Nominated	
Satellite Awards	2011	Best Actress in a Series, Drama	Connie Britton	Nominated	
Screen Actors Guild Awards	2009	Outstanding Performance by a Stunt Ensemble in a Television Series	Justin Riemer and Jeff Schwan	Nominated	
Screen Actors Guild Awards	2012	Outstanding Performance by a Male Actor in a Drama Series	Kyle Chandler	Nominated	
Teen Choice Awards	2007	Choice TV: Breakout Show	Friday Night Lights	Nominated	
Teen Choice Awards	2007	Choice TV: Breakout	Taylor Kitsch	Nominated	
Teen Choice Awards	2008	Choice TV Show: Drama	Friday Night Lights	Nominated	
Teen Choice Awards	2008	Choice TV Actor: Drama	Taylor Kitsch	Nominated	
Television Critics Association Awards	2007	Individual Achievement in Drama	Kyle Chandler	Nominated	
Television Critics Association Awards	2007	Individual Achievement in Drama	Connie Britton	Nominated	
Television Critics Association Awards	2007	Outstanding Achievement in Drama	Friday Night Lights	Nominated	
Television Critics Association Awards	2007	Outstanding New Program of the Year	Friday Night Lights	Won	
Television Critics Association Awards	2007	Program of the Year	Friday Night Lights	Nominated	
Television Critics Association Awards	2008	Individual Achievement in Drama	Connie Britton	Nominated	
Television Critics Association Awards	2008	Outstanding Achievement in Drama	Friday Night Lights	Nominated	
Television Critics Association Awards	2009	Outstanding Achievement in Drama	Friday Night Lights	Nominated	
Television Critics Association Awards	2010	Program of the Year	Friday Night Lights	Nominated	
Television Critics Association Awards	2011	Outstanding Achievement in Drama	Friday Night Lights	Nominated	
Television Critics Association Awards	2011	Program of the Year	Friday Night Lights	Won	
Texas Film Hall of Fame	2011	Star of Texas Award	Friday Night Lights	Won	
Writers Guild of America Awards	2007	Best New Series	Bridget Carpenter, Kerry Ehrin, Carter Harris, Elizabeth Heldens, David Hudgins, Jason Katims, Patrick Massett, Andy Miller, Aaron Rahsaan Thomas, and John Zinman	Nominated	
Writers Guild of America Awards	2008	Best Dramatic Series	Bridget Carpenter, Kerry Ehrin, Carter Harris, Elizabeth Heldens, David Hudgins, Jason Katims, Patrick Massett, Andy Miller, Aaron Rahsaan Thomas, and John Zinman	Nominated	
Writers Guild of America Awards	2009	Best Dramatic Series	Bridget Carpenter, Kerry Ehrin, Ron Fitzgerald, Brent Fletcher, Etan Frankel, Jason Gavin, Elizabeth Heldens, David Hudgins, Rolin Jones, Jason Katims, Patrick Massett, Derek Santos Olson, and John Zinman	Nominated	
Writers Guild of America Awards	2010	Best Dramatic Series	Bridget Carpenter, Kerry Ehrin, Ron Fitzgerald, Etan Frankel, Monica Henderson, David Hudgins, Rolin Jones, Jason Katims, Patrick Massett, Derek Santos Olson, and John Zinman	Nominated	
Writers Guild of America Awards	2011	Best Drama Series	Bridget Carpenter, Kerry Ehrin, Ron Fitzgerald, Etan Frankel, Monica Henderson, David Hudgins, Rolin Jones, Jason Katims, Patrick Massett, Derek Santos Olson, and John Zinman	Nominated	
Young Hollywood Awards	2011	TV Actress of the Year	Aimee Teegarden	Won	
