= May the Best Man Win =

- Friday Night Lights episode
- Episode no.: Season 2 Episode 15
- Directed by: Patrick Norris
- Written by: David Hudgins
- Cinematography by: Todd McMullen
- Editing by: Stephen Michael
- Original release date: February 8, 2008
- Running time: 43 minutes

Guest appearances
- Peter Berg as Morris "Mo" McArnold; Glenn Morshower as Chad Clarke; Kevin Rankin as Herc; Brad Leland as Buddy Garrity; Matt Czuchry as Chris Kennedy; Benny Ciaramello as Santiago Herrera; Jana Kramer as Noelle Davenport

Episode chronology
← Previous "Leave No One Behind"	Next → "I Knew You When"
- Friday Night Lights (season 2)

"May the Best Man Win" is the fifteenth episode and season finale of the second season of the American sports drama television series Friday Night Lights, inspired by the 1990 nonfiction book by H. G. Bissinger. It is the 37th overall episode of the series and was written by co-executive producer David Hudgins, and directed by Patrick Norris. It originally aired on NBC on February 8, 2008.

The series is set in the fictional town of Dillon, a small, close-knit community in rural West Texas. It follows a high school football team, the Dillon Panthers. It features a set of characters, primarily connected to Coach Eric Taylor, his wife Tami, and their daughter Julie. In the episode, Smash stresses over his future, while Eric gets jealous when Tami's old high school boyfriend resurfaces. Meanwhile, Jason receives unexpected news, while Tim starts working at the radio station.

According to Nielsen Media Research, the episode was seen by an estimated 5.22 million household viewers and gained a 1.7/5 ratings share among adults aged 18–49. The episode received positive reviews from critics, who praised the performances, humor and character development, although they also felt the episode did not work as a season finale.

== Plot ==
Smash (Gaius Charles) desperately tries to reach other colleges to check on his lost scholarships, but his calls are not welcomed. At the dealership, Jason (Scott Porter) is visited by Erin (Tamara Jolaine), the waitress who helped him at his date. She surprises him when she reveals she is pregnant with his baby.

Tami (Connie Britton) runs into her old high school boyfriend, Morris "Mo" McArnold (Peter Berg), who is visiting to buy a shopping center. Tami agrees in accompanying him to a new memorial hospital opening, although his presence bothers Eric (Kyle Chandler). Mo extends his visit in Dillon, and continues hanging out with Tami. During a dinner, Mo and Eric get into an argument over Mo's feelings for Tami, which escalates into a physical brawl. The following morning, Julie (Aimee Teegarden) questions her father over his bruises. Eric jokingly replies that he defended her mother's honor.

After the University of Alabama rejects him, Smash is desperate over any possible colleges. Eric gets him to meet with Whitmore University, one of the few that hasn't rescinded his scholarship, despite Smash's resentment towards the football team's poor track record. However, he is moved when Whitmore's coach reveals that he supported Smash for the past years and predicted that he would become a star. Smash immediately announces his verbal commitment to Whitmore. Tim (Taylor Kitsch) starts working at the radio station, creating a new sports segment. Lyla (Minka Kelly) is annoyed, but Chris (Matt Czuchry) is fine, as he knows Tim won't change her mind. However, Lyla questions her relationship after meeting Chris' family over dinner.

Learning that the odds were miraculous, Jason visits Erin at work, trying to get her to keep the baby, but she is not convinced. He talks with Eric, who tells him that he needs to establish truth and honesty with her if he really wants to become a father. Jason once again meets with Erin, telling her that he will be present every day for their child, asking her to "give it a chance."

== Production ==
=== Development ===
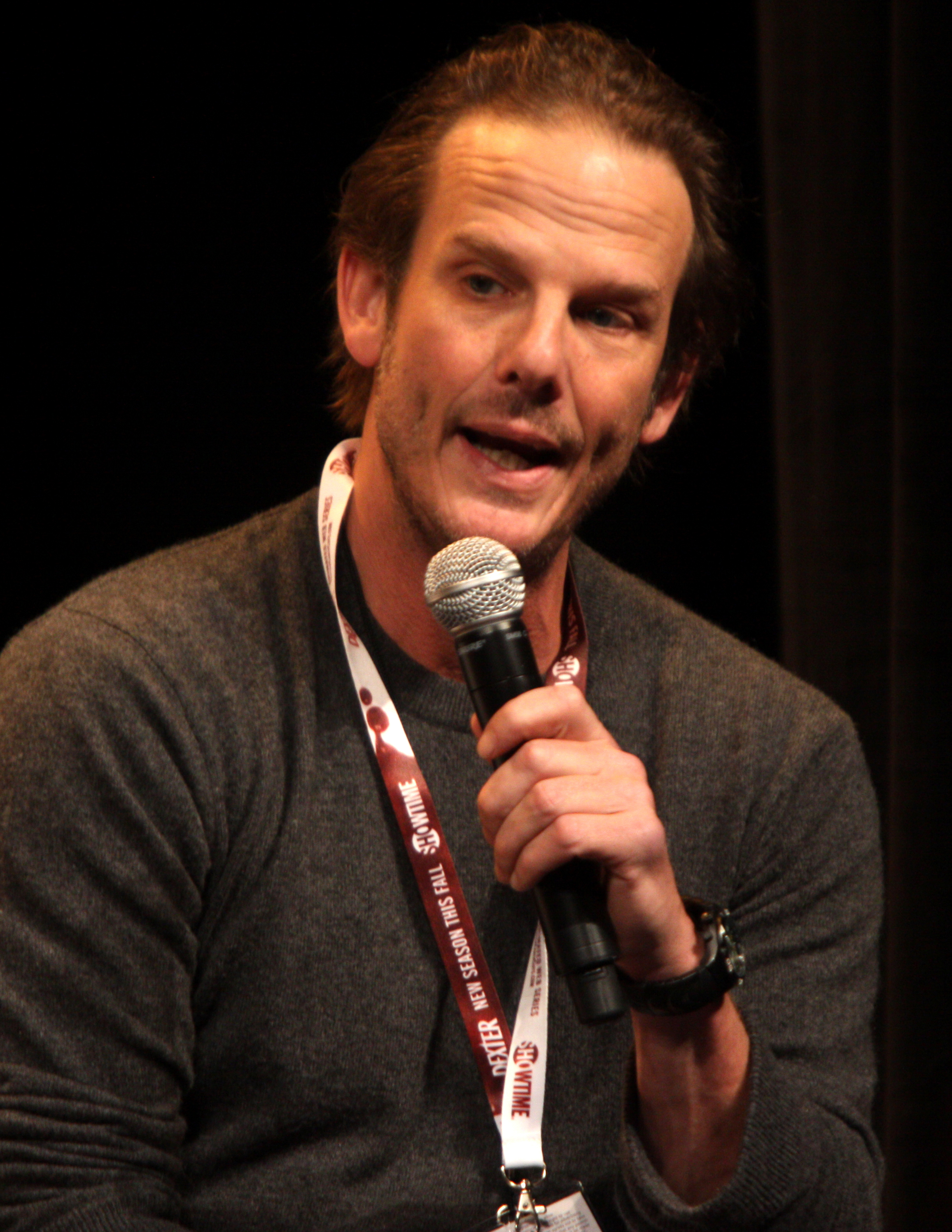
Series developer Peter Berg guest stars in the episode.

In January 2008, NBC announced that the fifteenth episode of the season would be titled "May the Best Man Win". The episode was written by co-executive producer David Hudgins, and directed by Patrick Norris. This was Hudgins' sixth writing credit, and Norris' second directing credit.

=== Writing ===
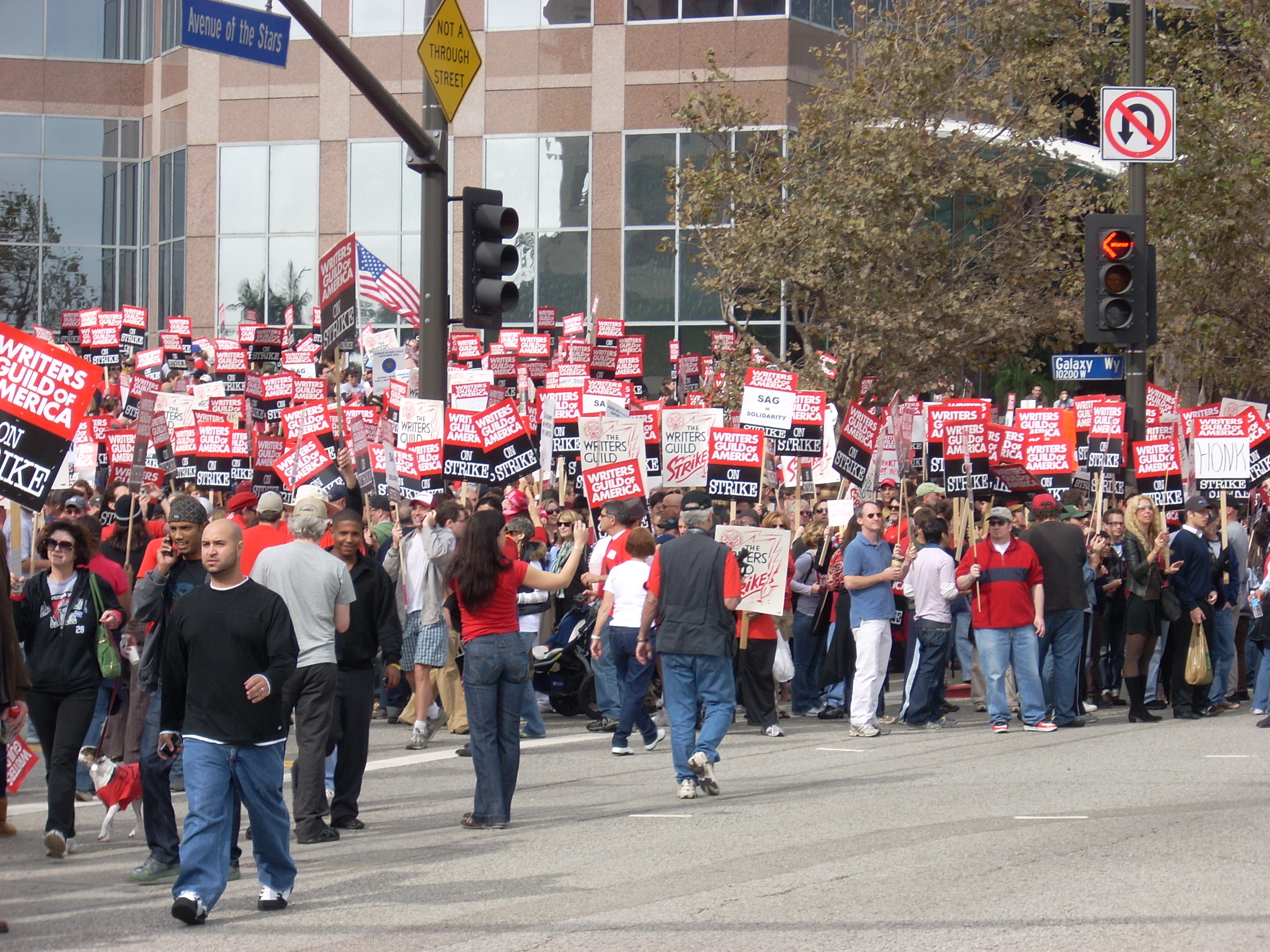
The Writers Guild of America was on strike for 100 days.

On November 5, 2007, the Writers Guild of America went on strike. The series had fifteen scripts written by the time the strike started, and thirteen episodes were already by that point. While the season had an order of 22 episodes, no more episodes were produced for the season. Jason Katims praised the final episodes as "some good beats of resolution and some good cliffhangers," while indicating that "the football season is unfinished and was going to be a very big part" of the second half of the season. Katims also said, "“If we were leading to the end of the season [under normal circumstances], we would have most likely brought the story around to the coach and his family again."

The episode's writer, David Hudgins, relates that he had one week to finish the script, as the strike would begin. He had specific instructions from Katims; Peter Berg wanted to appear, he wanted to fly a helicopter and wanted to fight with Eric. In retrospect, he felt that "I think the audience was pretty forgiving" in accepting the episode as the season finale.

== Reception ==
=== Viewers ===
In its original American broadcast, "May the Best Man Win" was seen by an estimated 5.22 million household viewers with a 1.7/5 in the 18–49 demographics. This means that 1.7 percent of all households with televisions watched the episode, while 5 percent of all of those watching television at the time of the broadcast watched it. This was a 8% decrease in viewership from the previous episode, which was watched by an estimated 5.64 million household viewers with a 1.9/6 in the 18–49 demographics.

=== Critical reviews ===
"May the Best Man Win" received positive reviews from critics. Eric Goldman of IGN gave the episode a "great" 8 out of 10 and wrote, "The fate of the show is still a ball of confusion, but it seems very unlikely that any more episodes will be produced this season. And whether the show will be back at all, and if so on what network, is very uncertain. So when it came time to watch 'May the Best Man Win' I did what I could to simply enjoy the show and the characters for the warm, fully formed creations they are."

Scott Tobias of The A.V. Club gave the episode an "A–" grade and wrote, "I was praying that we'd be carrying tonight's episode out on our shoulders like a champion, rather than helping it off the field as it pulled up with another hammie in an uneven, injury-plagued season. So I was relieved — nay, overjoyed to the point of tears — to see Friday Night Lights go out as the show I know and love." Ken Tucker of Entertainment Weekly wrote, "the stuff that was pure gold this week included the characters who've been rock-solid all season anyway: Coach Eric and Tami Taylor, and the cool-as-a-long-haired-cucumber Tim Riggins. As much as I've hated the introduction of Lyla's religious love, Chris, the contrast to Kitsch's Riggins has been highly satisfying."

Alan Sepinwall wrote, "'May the Best Man Win' wasn't quite as outstanding as last week's effort but it was still damn good." Leah Friedman of TV Guide wrote, "A big "Thank You" to the incredible, wonderful, unbelievably talented writers of this show for writing an episode such as this. It didn't have the sense of finality that we got with last year's "State", but it did give us closure."

Andrew Johnston of Slant Magazine wrote, "The episode resolves one major continuing story line — the crisis enveloping the future career of “Smash” Williams — and does so in style. The other ongoing stories, and the new ones that are introduced, are considerably less promising, but past experience has shows us that you can't really judge an FNL storyline until you see how it plays out — which largely leaves us in limbo." Daniel Fienberg of Zap2it wrote, "Thanks to the writers strike, Friday (Feb. 8) night's episode of Friday Night Lights is very likely to be the drama's season finale. Thanks to ratings that have never equaled its critical acclaim, it may also have been its series finale. It sure didn't feel like either kind of ending."

Brett Love of TV Squad wrote, "Season two has been a bumpy ride. Even with all of the oddness, it's still been worth the journey. And this is still a show I'll be happy to recommend to people, although, I'll be recommending the season one DVDs. Should this end up being the end of the show, it's not a very satisfying conclusion." Television Without Pity gave the episode a "B+" grade.
