= The Confession (Friday Night Lights) =

- Friday Night Lights episode
- Episode no.: Season 2 Episode 9
- Directed by: Allison Liddi-Brown
- Written by: Bridget Carpenter
- Cinematography by: Todd McMullen
- Editing by: Peter B. Ellis
- Original release date: December 7, 2007
- Running time: 43 minutes

Guest appearances
- Glenn Morshower as Chad Clarke; Jessalyn Gilsig as Shelley Hayes; Brad Leland as Buddy Garrity; Benny Ciaramello as Santiago Herrera; Daniella Alonso as Carlotta Alonso; Kevin Rankin as Herc

Episode chronology
← Previous "Seeing Other People"	Next → "There Goes the Neighborhood"
- Friday Night Lights (season 2)

"The Confession" is the ninth episode of the second season of the American sports drama television series Friday Night Lights, inspired by the 1990 nonfiction book by H. G. Bissinger. It is the 31st overall episode of the series and was written by supervising producer Bridget Carpenter and directed by Allison Liddi-Brown. It originally aired on NBC on December 7, 2007.

The series is set in the fictional town of Dillon, a small, close-knit community in rural West Texas. It follows a high school football team, the Dillon Panthers. It features a set of characters, primarily connected to Coach Eric Taylor, his wife Tami, and their daughter Julie. In the episode, Landry's confession prompts Chad to hire a lawyer. Meanwhile, the Taylors prepare for Gracie's christening, while Jason goes on a date.

According to Nielsen Media Research, the episode was seen by an estimated 5.14 million household viewers and gained a 1.8 ratings share among adults aged 18–49. The episode received positive reviews from critics; while critics heavily criticized Landry's subplot throughout the season, they praised the closure on the storyline as well as Jesse Plemons' performance.

== Plot ==
Landry (Jesse Plemons) is questioned over Mike's murder. While the detective wants to know more details, Landry only states that he killed him. Chad (Glenn Morshower) is forced to step in for his son, and forcibly takes him home while the detectives work on the case.

Santiago (Benny Ciaramello) fails to impress during training, and Eric (Kyle Chandler) reconsiders about letting him play in their coming game against the Fort Hood Cougars. Buddy (Brad Leland) gets into an argument with Santiago, who accuses him of only using him. Buddy then states that the team and school are his only things at a normal life and that he shouldn't waste it. Busy with Gracie's christening arrangements, Eric appoints Tim (Taylor Kitsch) to help the athletic department with many duties. However, Eric's "punishment" does not fully work as Tim actually enjoys participating in the tournaments. Tim notices his roommate at one of the tournaments and scolds him for trying to get to him. Smash (Gaius Charles) tells Matt (Zach Gilford) he should set some "ground rules" in his relationship with Carlotta (Daniella Alonso) due to her employment.

Julie (Aimee Teegarden) starts feeling exhausted due to the amount of tasks that Tami (Connie Britton) is asking her, as it is conflicting with her school life. She asks Eric to help Tami come to her senses, but Eric's conversation fails to change anything with Tami. Julie and Tami get into a heated argument, with both expressing that the other is not thankful for what they do for each other. Meanwhile, Herc (Kevin Rankin) introduces Jason (Scott Porter) to a dating website for people in wheelchairs, and Jason takes an interest in a girl named Isabella. However, the date goes awry when Jason is disgusted by her personality and personally asks the waitress to help him get rid of her. The waitress gives him a ride home, where they share a kiss. After spending the night with her, Jason tells his parents that he will move in with Herc.

Chad informs Tyra (Adrianne Palicki) about Landry's confession and advises her to get a lawyer, angering her. Even with the lawyer trying to move the murder as an act of self-defense, Landry is only intent on paying for killing Mike. Chad tells Landry that his fear is not that Landry can't handle consequences, but his fear is actually Chad being afraid that his own son could go to jail. Landry also talks with Tyra, asking her if she really was in danger. With tears, Tyra says she feared Mike would come back, saying that Landry saved her life.

The Panthers are losing the game towards the Cougars. Initially rejecting Buddy's request, Eric eventually decides to get Santiago to play. Santiago's defense allows the Panthers to make a comeback and win the game, with Buddy telling Santiago that he "won" the game. Having had enough of his roommate, Tim decides to move out. On the day of the christening, Tami and Julie reconcile. Eric finds Tim sleeping on his parked car outside his house, and gives him a sleeping bag. Landry visits Tyra, telling her that he won't be charged with anything, and they embrace.

== Production ==
=== Development ===
In November 2007, NBC announced that the ninth episode of the season would be titled "The Confession". The episode was written by supervising producer Bridget Carpenter, and directed by Allison Liddi-Brown. This was Carpenter's fourth writing credit, and Liddi-Brown's fourth directing credit.

== Reception ==
=== Viewers ===
In its original American broadcast, "The Confession" was seen by an estimated 5.14 million household viewers with a 1.8 in the 18–49 demographics. This means that 1.8 percent of all households with televisions watched the episode. It finished 72nd out of 102 programs airing from December 3–9, 2007. This was a 7% decrease in viewership from the previous episode, which was watched by an estimated 5.47 million household viewers with a 1.9 in the 18–49 demographics.

=== Critical reviews ===
"The Confession" received positive reviews from critics. Eric Goldman of IGN gave the episode a "good" 7.2 out of 10 and wrote, "Okay Friday Night Lights, no more murder stories! 'The Confession' seems to have put the on so poorly thought out Landry/Tyra storyline to rest, and that's a good thing. It's just too bad we had to spend so much time on it in the first place."

Scott Tobias of The A.V. Club gave the episode an "A–" grade and wrote, "Overall, 'The Confession' turned out to be a very strong episode, second only to the magical 'Let's Get It On' hour in Week Five. If casual viewers tuned in to watch the exciting conclusion of the VBM, they got a chance to see the show operating at near-peak form, with a nice balance of lump-in-the-throat moments and some refreshing light comedy." Ken Tucker of Entertainment Weekly wrote, "Boy, they sure crammed a lotta stories into Friday Night Lights this week, didn't they? It was as though, anticipating the writers' strike, the producers mapped out an episode that tied up some plot-lines, made sure just about every major character got significant screen-time, and now hope to leave us happy and wanting more when the show comes back, as the NBC announcer said, 'in the new year.'"

Alan Sepinwall wrote, "When Friday Night Lights is at its best, it's about a community, and about how one part of it (the football team) reaches out and touches everyone in it. The Landry story, and the Carlotta story, and most of the plots this season have been so compartmentalized from each other that it feels like each one has its own separate writer, and their scenes get jammed together to fit a script that covers a given week of the football season. That said, some of the stories are working even though they're disconnected from everything else." Leah Friedman of TV Guide wrote, "Well, it only took eight episodes, but the Friday Night Lights we know and love is back. What a fantastic show we had this week; between Landry's crisis of conscience, Tami and Julie getting back on good terms, Santiago and Buddy bonding, Matt and Carlotta "cooking", Jason's crazy date, and Tim's continued repentance, nearly everyone we love (with the notable exception of Smash) got a chance to shine tonight. All that, and the Panthers finally won a game."

Andrew Johnston of Slant Magazine wrote, "Somewhat surprisingly in light of the title, Landry's admission of guilt occupied a relatively small chunk of 'The Confession.' That's too bad, since it offered us by far the best scenes of the episode. There were some fine moments in the other story lines, but some seriously false notes in Jason Street and Tim Riggins' stories kept this from raking among the upper tier of Friday Night Lights episodes." Rick Porter of Zap2it wrote, "Ladies and gentlemen, our long national nightmare is over. That's what it looks like, anyway, after an episode of Friday Night Lights that appeared to put the Incident behind us. To which I can only say: Half a season was sacrificed to that?"

Brett Love of TV Squad wrote, "It's been a rocky first 40% of the season, but now that the murder is in the rear view, I am as anxious as ever to see what comes next." Television Without Pity gave the episode a "B–" grade.

Bridget Carpenter submitted this episode for consideration for Outstanding Writing for a Drama Series at the 60th Primetime Emmy Awards.
