= Let's Get It On (Friday Night Lights) =

- Friday Night Lights episode
- Episode no.: Season 2 Episode 5
- Directed by: David Boyd
- Written by: Patrick Massett; John Zinman
- Cinematography by: Todd McMullen
- Editing by: Peter B. Ellis
- Original release date: November 2, 2007
- Running time: 43 minutes

Guest appearances
- Glenn Morshower as Chad Clarke; Brad Leland as Buddy Garrity; Daniella Alonso as Carlotta Alonso

Episode chronology
← Previous "Backfire"	Next → "How Did I Get Here"
- Friday Night Lights (season 2)

"Let's Get It On" is the fifth episode of the second season of the American sports drama television series Friday Night Lights, inspired by the 1990 nonfiction book by H. G. Bissinger. It is the 27th overall episode of the series and was written by consulting producers Patrick Massett and John Zinman and directed by David Boyd. It originally aired on NBC on November 2, 2007.

The series is set in the fictional town of Dillon, a small, close-knit community in rural West Texas. It follows a high school football team, the Dillon Panthers. It features a set of characters, primarily connected to Coach Eric Taylor, his wife Tami, and their daughter Julie. In the episode, Eric's return to Dillon requires solving the animosity between Smash and Matt. Meanwhile, Lyla and Tim try to convince Jason not to get the surgery, while Landry's father learns more from Tyra's past.

According to Nielsen Media Research, the episode was seen by an estimated 5.40 million household viewers and gained a 1.8 ratings share among adults aged 18–49. The episode received generally positive reviews from critics, who praised the performances, although some were conflicted by Landry's subplot.

== Plot ==
Lyla (Minka Kelly) arrives in Mexico, causing Jason (Scott Porter) to get angry at Tim (Taylor Kitsch) for calling her. In Dillon, Eric (Kyle Chandler) unsuccessfully tries to convince Tami (Connie Britton) to have sex, as she feels exhausted after taking care of Gracie.

Eric returns to coaching the Panthers, and is surprised when Landry (Jesse Plemons) displays great tactics, although conflicts between Matt (Zach Gilford) and Smash (Gaius Charles) dampen training. Eric invites them over to dine with him to discuss their problems, but it worsens when Matt accuses Eric of using them to get to TMU and leaving when he realized it was not a dream job. Matt is also approached by Julie (Aimee Teegarden), who wants to hang out more often with him despite their break-up.

Disgusted with Tim's antics in Mexico, Lyla decides to leave, after finding that Tim's plan was to get Jason on a booze cruise. Tim then calls her out for not staying with Jason through his search for treatment, prompting Lyla to stay in Mexico. On the booze cruise, Tim and Lyla try to convince Jason to abandon treatment, which he flatly refuses. Tim then calls out Jason for his recklessness, as he will not let him take a treatment that could kill him. Jason then decides to jump off into the ocean, and manages to reach the shore despite his disability. Lyla and Tim reach Jason, who tells them he will not take the treatment and they leave back to Texas.

Chad (Glenn Morshower) overhears co-workers talking about Tyra (Adrianne Palicki), as they deem her a possible person of interest due to her criminal record. He asks Landry about Tyra's relationship with the dead man, but Landry claims not to know anything. Chad visits Tyra at home, knowing that Landry is lying for her, and tells her to stop seeing him. During the game against the Westerby Chaps, Eric decides to bench Matt and Smash, but it results in a 13–0 deficit by halftime. In the locker room, Landry brings up the idea that the team cannot be divided and that they are stronger together, which motivates Eric and the team. For the second half, Eric gets Landry into the game to make his football debut, and he impresses by tackling a player who intercepted the ball, forcing a fumble that the Panthers recover and return for a touchdown.

With a few seconds left, Matt and Smash put aside their differences and convince Eric in getting them into the game. Matt's pass towards Landry is incomplete, but a penalty flag allows the Panthers to try another play, and Smash manages to score a touchdown to get the win. Landry is praised for his performance in a party, but he is heartbroken when Tyra breaks up with him, saying she wants to protect him. Matt declines Julie's request to hang out, still upset that she prioritized the Swede over him. At home, Tami suggests to Eric that they should "fool around", which Eric gladly accepts.

== Production ==
=== Development ===
In October 2007, NBC announced that the fifth episode of the season would be titled "Let's Get It On". The episode was written by consulting producers Patrick Massett and John Zinman and directed by David Boyd. This was Massett's fourth writing credit, Zinman's fourth writing credit, and Boyd's third directing credit.

== Reception ==
=== Viewers ===
In its original American broadcast, "Let's Get It On" was seen by an estimated 5.40 million household viewers with a 1.8 in the 18–49 demographics. This means that 1.8 percent of all households with televisions watched the episode. This was a 8% decrease in viewership from the previous episode, which was watched by an estimated 5.81 million household viewers with a 2.0 in the 18–49 demographics.

=== Critical reviews ===
"Let's Get It On" received generally positive reviews from critics. Eric Goldman of IGN gave the episode a "good" 7.6 out of 10 and wrote, "It's just hard to fathom why so many bad choices are being done with this character this season. The murder storyline is outlandish, but so in its own way is Landry joining the Panthers. Trying to deal with both at once is a really huge stretch."

Scott Tobias of The A.V. Club gave the episode an "A" grade and wrote, "Coming after four hours of stumblin', bumblin', and fumblin', tonight's episode offered resounding proof of why critic-types like myself (and a too-small cadre of disciples) have been declaring Friday Night Lights the best drama on network television. Virtually every scene was beautifully observed and acted, full of exacting dialogue and painful truths, and suffused with authentic emotion. It's by far the strongest episode of this season and maybe one of the all-time best, though perhaps that's the lump in my throat talking after watching my beloved show return to form."

Alan Sepinwall wrote, "the non-Landry portions of the episode were terrific. The show seems to finally be finding its season two footing, but there's this millstone of a storyline that keeps tripping it up." Casey Marsella of TV Guide wrote, "Jesse Plemons made Dillon stand up and cheer tonight. His performance is what I love about this show. I've always noticed that the people who seem "out of place" are usually the ones most comfortable in their own skin. Landry used to be the goofy, one-liner sidekick, but he was always sure of himself. Tonight he proved that."

Andrew Johnston of Slant Magazine wrote, "With Coach Taylor back where he belongs, at home with Tami and at the helm of the Panthers, Friday Night Lights serves up its most season one-line season two episode yet. I've generally liked the episodes that followed 'Last Days of Summer', but not since then has there been an episode that really felt like Friday Night Lights." Rick Porter of Zap2it wrote, "Eric Taylor is back in town, and not a moment too soon. The prodigal coach's return to Dillon made for one of the more satisfying Friday Night Lights experiences of the season."

Brett Love of TV Squad wrote, "Things are moving along quite nicely now. I liked that we got a measure of happiness this week in the form of the team winning, Street coming to grips to with his situation, and the Taylors getting their green light. There have been a lot of heavy stories dropped on Dillon so far this season, and this balanced it out nicely." Television Without Pity gave the episode a "B+" grade.
