= Friday Night Lights season 2 =

Friday Night Lights
- Season 2
- Season 2 DVD cover
- No. of episodes: 15

Release
- Original network: NBC
- Original release: October 5, 2007 – February 8, 2008

Season chronology
- ← Previous; Season 1 Next → Season 3

The second season of the American serial drama television series Friday Night Lights commenced airing in the United States and Canada on October 5, 2007, and concluded its 15-episode season on February 8, 2008, on NBC. While initially renewed for a 22-episode full season, the show ended production for the season after filming the 15th episode, due to the 2007–08 Writers Guild of America strike. The series' future was once again placed in doubt as it did not return to production once the strike ended, and it continued to suffer from low ratings in its new Friday at 9:00 pm time slot. However, NBC announced in April 2008 that the show would return for a third season, with first-run broadcasts airing on DirecTV's The 101 Network. The second season was released on DVD in region 1 on April 22, 2008.

Season 2 continues to focus on the Dillon Panthers, as the pressures and challenges on and off the field have reached new highs after the team won the 2006 Texas 5A State Championship and lost head coach Eric Taylor to a coaching job at Texas Methodist University.

== Crew ==
The season was produced by NBC Universal Television, Imagine Television, and Film 44, and was aired on NBC in the United States. Peter Berg, Sarah Aubrey, David Nevins, Brian Grazer, and Jason Katims continued to serve as executive producers, with Jeffrey Reiner, and John Cameron serving as co-executive producers. Writers included Katims, producers David Hudgins and Bridget Carpenter, consulting producers Kerry Ehrin, Patrick Massett, and John Zinman, supervising producers Carter Harris and Elizabeth Heldens, and Aaron Rahsaan Thomas. Katims also served as showrunner. Regular directors throughout the season include Reiner, Jonas Pate, and David Boyd. Theme song music was composed by W. G. Snuffy Walden. Songs from Explosions in the Sky were also used throughout the season.

== Cast ==
The second season saw all 10 star billing roles of season 1 return. Kyle Chandler portrayed Eric Taylor, head coach of the Dillon Panthers. Connie Britton played Tami Taylor, wife of Eric's and guidance counselor of Dillon High School. Gaius Charles played Brian "Smash" Williams, the cocky running back and star of the team. Zach Gilford played quarterback Matt Saracen. Minka Kelly played Lyla Garrity, former girlfriend of Panthers assistant coach Jason Street played by Scott Porter. Taylor Kitsch portrayed Tim Riggins, fullback, resident bad boy, and best friend of Street's. Adrianne Palicki played bad girl Tyra Collette. Jesse Plemons played Landry Clarke, Saracen's best friend. Aimee Teegarden played Julie Taylor, daughter of Eric and Tami's.

Supporting characters who also returned include: Brad Leland as Lyla's father and head of the Dillon Panther's Booster Club Buddy Garrity, Derek Phillips as Tim's brother Billy Riggins, Louanne Stephens as Saracen's grandmother Lorraine Saracen, Liz Mikel as Smash's mother Corrina Williams, Kevin Rankin as Herc, Blue Deckert as Panther coach Mac MacGill, and Dana Wheeler-Nicholson as Tyra's mother Angela Collette.

New guest stars this season included: Glenn Morshower as Landry's father and Dillon police officer Chad Clarke, Daniella Alonso as Lorraine Saracen's new live-in nurse Carlotta, Jessalyn Gilsig as Tami's sister Shelley Hayes, Benny Ciaramello as Santiago Herrera, Chris Mulkey as Coach Bill McGregor, and Matt Czuchry as Lyla's boyfriend Chris Kennedy.

== Season synopsis ==
At the beginning of Season 2, Coach Taylor is living in Austin and coaching at Texas Methodist University as the new football season draws closer. With Taylor gone, coach McGregor is butting heads with players and boosters, Smash's increased cockiness is angering his teammates, and the pressure to get back to the State Championship is increasing, and the Panthers slowly begin falling apart. Things are not well at the Taylor home, either, following the birth of Eric and Tami's daughter Gracie. Tami becomes depressed as she takes care of Gracie alone. Julie refuses to help her mother, begins spending time with male co-worker "The Swede", and breaks up with Matt. Matt, upset over both the breakup and Coach Taylor's absence, faces even more challenges as a rift between himself and Smash emerges, and caring for his grandmother becomes a bigger struggle as her dementia slowly worsens.

Tensions reach a boiling point during the first game of the season. With Taylor watching, Coach McGregor angers the boosters by switching the final play, resulting in Smash and Matt's getting into a physical confrontation. Tami loses it with Julie and slaps her across the face during a late night argument. Street quits his position as assistant coach, fed up with the team and with learning that his condition will not improve, even after he regains full motor control in one of his hands. After losing the second game and seeing another physical confrontation between Smash and Matt, the boosters fire McGregor and offer Taylor the position if he'll leave TMU. Taylor, seeing how bad things are at home with his family and former team, leaves TMU and returns to coach the Panthers.

== Fictional game results ==
Opponent	Result	Score	Record	Episode No.	Episode
Regular season
South Milbank Rattlers	Win	6–0	1–0	3	"Are You Ready for Friday Night?"
Wescott Warriors	Loss	Unknown^{[a]}	1–1	4	"Backfire"
Westerby Chaps	Win	20–19	2–1	5	"Let's Get It On"
McNulty Mavericks	Loss	0–37^{[b]}	2–2	8	"Seeing Other People"
Fort Hood Cougars	Win	Unknown^{[c]}	3–2	9	"The Confession"
Laribee Lions	Win	43-38^{[d]}	4–2	11	"Jumping the Gun"
Royal Rock Dragons	Win	Unknown^{[e]}	5–2	14	"Leave No One Behind"
South Pines Tigers	Win	45–6	6–2	15	"May the Best Man Win"
Postseason
Arnett Mead Tigers	Loss	Unknown^{[f]}	6–3	15	Shown in season 3, episode 1, "I Knew You When"

^{a} Score was not revealed during episode.
^{b} Score at the end of the third quarter. Final score wasn't revealed.
^{c} Score 28–13 (Fort Hood) at the end of the second quarter. Final score wasn't revealed.
^{d} Panthers' awarded the victory after opposing coach interfered with game play.
^{e} Shown in a deleted scene where the Panthers are playing Royal Rock. Wasn't shown in actual episode.
^{f} Shown in a scene during the beginning of season 3, spisode 1.

== Episodes ==
No. overall	No. in season	Title	Directed by	Written by	Original release date	U.S. viewers (millions)
23	1	"Last Days of Summer"	Jeffrey Reiner	Jason Katims	October 5, 2007	6.37
In the second-season premiere, Coach Taylor returns to town when Tami goes into labor and realizes how much things have changed. Elsewhere, Julie flirts with a guy at the pool; and Tyra appoints Landry as her protector.
24	2	"Bad Ideas"	Jeffrey Reiner	Elizabeth Heldens	October 12, 2007	5.46
The start of the school year finds Tami struggling without Eric's parenting help. Elsewhere, Matt and Landry have difficulty adjusting to new lifestyles. Smash, on the other hand, basks in accolades from coaches, scouts and fans.
25	3	"Are You Ready for Friday Night?"	Seith Mann	Kerry Ehrin	October 19, 2007	5.37
Smash and Matt bring their animosity for one another to the field during the Panthers' first game of the season; Coach Taylor makes another trip home; Riggins finds himself looking for comfort in an odd place; and Street explores his options in dealing with his paralysis.
26	4	"Backfire"	Jonas Pate	David Hudgins	October 26, 2007	5.81
Coach Taylor makes a huge career move. Riggins and Street head to Mexico as Street hopes to explore experimental surgery. Riggins, who is concerned about Street, turns to Lyla who is busy trying to help newcomer to Dillon Santiago Herrera. A big development in a police search instills more trepidation in the lives of Tyra and Landry.
27	5	"Let's Get It On"	David Boyd	Patrick Massett & John Zinman	November 2, 2007	5.40
Coach Taylor deals with his disheveled team, led by the conflict between Matt and Smash. Meanwhile, Tim and Lyla try to change Jason's mind about the experimental surgery. Julie asks Matt to hang out. Landry plays his first game for the Panthers.
28	6	"How Did I Get Here"	Jonas Pate	Carter Harris	November 9, 2007	5.56
Building pressure forces Landry to tell his dad the truth about the killing; the arrival of Tami's sister prompts Tami to reexamine the life she's leading; and Riggins has something to prove after he's kicked off the team. Matt strikes up a relationship with the new girl named Lauren (Kim Smith), upsetting Julie.
29	7	"Pantherama!"	David Boyd	Bridget Carpenter	November 16, 2007	5.96
Smash's college options are revealed on the first official day of recruitment; Coach Taylor focuses on a new athlete; Matt is tempted by his grandma's nurse even though he has a new girlfriend; Julie befriends a new teacher; and Lyla and Tyra work on Pantherama together at Tami's bidding; Tim moves into Tyra's because of Billy and Jackie.
30	8	"Seeing Other People"	Jeffrey Reiner	Elizabeth Heldens	November 30, 2007	5.47
Smash visits a college that's recruiting him; Matt considers an open relationship; Tami lashes out at Julie's teacher; Eric is jealous of Tami's relationship with her colleague; and Tyra's attacker's brother asks to meet with her.
31	9	"The Confession"	Allison Liddi-Brown	Bridget Carpenter	December 7, 2007	5.14
Landry continues to struggle with his conscience when he confesses to the murder of Tyra's attacker; Street contemplates his future as Herc sets him up with an online dating service; tension continues to build between Tami and Julie.
32	10	"There Goes the Neighborhood"	Jeffrey Reiner	David Hudgins	January 4, 2008	5.53
The Panthers host a rival team whose school was hit by a tornado. Tami, Julie, and Riggins adjust to their new living situation. Lyla's mom plans to remarry, and Landry and Tyra attempt to put the murder behind them.
33	11	"Jumping the Gun"	Dan Attias	Patrick Massett & John Zinman	January 11, 2008	5.80
Smash faces pressure from colleges who are looking for a verbal commitment. Tension continues to run high between Coach Taylor and Tim Riggins, with regard to Julie. The Panthers prepare to take on Laribee in the biggest game of the season. Tami and her sister continue to see things differently.
34	12	"Who Do You Think You Are?"	Michael Waxman	Kerry Ehrin	January 18, 2008	5.33
Coach and Tami look into day care for Gracie, but find themselves having a tough time letting go. Lyla begins working as a DJ on a Christian radio station and, despite being ridiculed by Tim, she is able to strike a chord with him. Matt discovers that he is actually in love with Carlotta, and Smash learns that those close to him may not be ready for interracial dating.
35	13	"Humble Pie"	Jeffrey Reiner	Carter Harris	January 25, 2008	5.37
Charges are pressed against Smash after a confrontation, Jason finds a new career, Tami is hired as the new volleyball coach and turns to Tyra for help, Tim faces a tough time trying to express his feelings for Lyla.
36	14	"Leave No One Behind"	Dean White	Aaron Rahsaan Thomas	February 1, 2008	5.64
Matt reaches a tough point in his life where nothing seems to really matter to him anymore. Tami’s relationship continues to grow with Tyra, as Julie becomes more and more jealous. Landry's new friend may screw up his relationship with Tyra, and Smash begins his three-game suspension.
37	15	"May the Best Man Win"	Patrick Norris	David Hudgins	February 8, 2008	5.22
Smash is determined to get a football scholarship, despite the recent events that have taken place, and is shocked when the most unlikely place gives him an offer that will change his life. Coach becomes jealous after Tami runs into her old high school boyfriend (Peter Berg). Jason receives the biggest news of his life since his accident. Tim continues his pursuit of Lyla.

== Reception ==
On Rotten Tomatoes, the season has an approval rating of 92% with an average score of 8 out of 10 based on 25 reviews. The website's critical consensus reads, "Despite an ill-advised story that threatens to puncture its aura of realism, Season Two of Friday Night Lights continues to deepen the show's winning portrayal of small-town America."
