= Leave No One Behind =

- Friday Night Lights episode
- Episode no.: Season 2 Episode 14
- Directed by: Dean White
- Written by: Aaron Rahsaan Thomas
- Cinematography by: Todd McMullen
- Editing by: Angela M. Catanzaro
- Original release date: February 1, 2008
- Running time: 43 minutes

Guest appearances
- Brad Leland as Buddy Garrity; Matt Czuchry as Chris Kennedy; Dana Wheeler-Nicholson as Angela Collette; Benny Ciaramello as Santiago Herrera

Episode chronology
← Previous "Humble Pie"	Next → "May the Best Man Win"
- Friday Night Lights (season 2)

"Leave No One Behind" is the fourteenth episode of the second season of the American sports drama television series Friday Night Lights, inspired by the 1990 nonfiction book by H. G. Bissinger. It is the 36th overall episode of the series and was written by Aaron Rahsaan Thomas, and directed by Dean White. It originally aired on NBC on February 1, 2008.

The series is set in the fictional town of Dillon, a small, close-knit community in rural West Texas. It follows a high school football team, the Dillon Panthers. It features a set of characters, primarily connected to Coach Eric Taylor, his wife Tami, and their daughter Julie. In the episode, Matt starts distancing himself from his duties at the team, while Smash faces problems in his future. Meanwhile, Tami teaches Julie how to drive, while Tyra feels jealous of Landry's new relationship.

According to Nielsen Media Research, the episode was seen by an estimated 5.64 million household viewers and gained a 1.9/6 ratings share among adults aged 18–49. The episode received critical acclaim, with critics praising the performances, writing and emotional tone.

== Plot ==
Matt (Zach Gilford) struggles in taking care of Lorraine (Louanne Stephens) by himself, after Carlotta goes back to Guatemala. On his way to school, his car breaks down and he angrily walks all the way to school. During a class, he angrily argues with his teacher, culminating by calling her "bitch" in front of the class and decides to leave the school early.

With Smash (Gaius Charles) suspended, Landry (Jesse Plemons) injured, and Matt nowhere to be found, Eric (Kyle Chandler) is forced to alter the team's status quo, worrying Buddy (Brad Leland). While stopping by an auto shop, Matt is seen by Tim (Taylor Kitsch), who invites him to a bar where they won't be asked to turn IDs. As they get drunk, Tim notices Lyla (Minka Kelly) and Chris (Matt Czuchry) showing up, and approaches them to talk to them. He then forces Matt to leave for training. Matt's state causes disarray during training, with Eric and Mac (Blue Deckert) concluding he was drunk.

Tami (Connie Britton) is teaching Julie (Aimee Teegarden) to drive in order to get her licence, while also continuing training the volleyball team. However, Julie is not happy that she is constantly hanging out with Tyra (Adrianne Palicki) and prioritizing the team over her. The tension reaches a breaking point when Tami throws a party for the team at her house, forgetting to accompany Julie to her driving test. Tami makes up by convincing the DMV supervisor in allowing her to take the test. Tyra feels threatened when Jean (Brea Grant) says she wants to be Landry's romantic partner. Tyra shows up during their date, confessing her feelings for Landry. While Landry is moved, he says he is happy with Jean as she loves him for who he is and is not embarrassed to be around him. As Tyra leaves, Jean kisses Landry in the lips. However, Landry decides to break up with Jean the following day, feeling it is not fair to her. He then visits Tyra and they kiss, resuming their relationship.

Smash informs Eric that TMU has decided to revoke his scholarship, and he laments that his professional career is over. As he throws off his records from his house, Corrina (Liz Mikel) consoles him. While at a strip club with Tim, Matt is forced to leave when Lorraine has an accident, asking a stripper to drive him to the hospital. Eric gets Matt and Lorraine to their house, where he forces Matt to shower and scold him for his behavior. Matt finally expresses that he feels everyone around him is abandoning him, and Eric consoles him. Before their game, Smash stops to motivate the team, telling them he'll join them in the playoffs. After the team leaves, Smash cries alone in the locker room.

== Production ==
=== Development ===
In January 2008, NBC announced that the fourteenth episode of the season would be titled "Leave No One Behind". The episode was written by Aaron Rahsaan Thomas, and directed by Dean White. This was Thomas' second writing credit, and White's first directing credit.

== Reception ==
=== Viewers ===
In its original American broadcast, "Leave No One Behind" was seen by an estimated 5.64 million household viewers with a 1.9/6 in the 18–49 demographics. This means that 1.9 percent of all households with televisions watched the episode, while 6 percent of all of those watching television at the time of the broadcast watched it. This was a 5% increase in viewership from the previous episode, which was watched by an estimated 5.37 million household viewers with a 1.9/5 in the 18–49 demographics.

=== Critical reviews ===
"Leave No One Behind" received critical acclaim. Eric Goldman of IGN gave the episode a "great" 8.8 out of 10 and wrote, "This is Friday Night Lights as I love it. In a season with too many accidental murders; trouble with drug dealers and other bigger than life occurrences, "Leave No One Behind" was a reminder that the show is so wonderful when it simply tells stories about these characters lives and plays things out in an emotionally believable way."

Donna Bowman of The A.V. Club gave the episode a "B+" grade and wrote, "We're building up steam heading into the postseason, folks, and even if I were as much of a detractor of recent Season 2 episodes as Scott, I would surely think that this week, especially in its final moments, was a return to form." Ken Tucker of Entertainment Weekly wrote, "I loved all the bad-boy-Matt scenes — this was a rebellion waiting to happen, and now that it has, all of his scenes captured the awkward ferocity of any essentially meek, decent person goes through when he or she goes on a tear for the first time. It's character development like this that makes Friday Night Lights so indispensable."

Alan Sepinwall wrote, "Dammit, why couldn't the show have been this good all season? I watch a scene like Coach throwing Saracen into the shower, or Smash firing up the team, or Tami clutching Gracie as she watches Julie take her driving test, and I'm reminded of why I loved Friday Night Lights in the first place. And that only makes the bulk of this season so much more frustrating." Leah Friedman of TV Guide wrote, "I declare Friedman’s First Law of FNL to be that for every person whose life starts going well, another must suffer. How else to explain the improving lives of Tyra and Landry versus the declining fortunes of Smash and Saracen?"

Andrew Johnston of Slant Magazine wrote, "I think it's safe to describe 'Leave No One Behind' as a vintage episode. For me, certainly, it exemplified almost everything that made me a fan during the first season — and, more than that, almost everything which made the series a significant source of personal inspiration during some very hard times." Rick Porter of Zap2it wrote, "I've now watched the episode twice, and the scene with Coach Taylor dousing him in the shower, and Matt finally letting loose all the pain he's been carrying around, hit me in the gut as hard the second time as it did the first. Zach Gilford is a pretty strong young actor, and it's nice to see him be front and center for a change this season."

Brett Love of TV Squad wrote, "And with that, only one episode left before FNL takes its place on the increasingly crowded sidelines. We're certainly going to be left with more questions than answers, but I'm taking solace in the fact that the ship has been righted." Television Without Pity gave the episode a "B" grade.

Gaius Charles and Zach Gilford submitted this episode for consideration for Outstanding Supporting Actor in a Drama Series at the 60th Primetime Emmy Awards.
