= Seeing Other People (Friday Night Lights) =

- Friday Night Lights episode
- Episode no.: Season 2 Episode 8
- Directed by: Jeffrey Reiner
- Written by: Elizabeth Heldens
- Cinematography by: Todd McMullen
- Editing by: Louise A. Innes
- Original release date: November 30, 2007
- Running time: 43 minutes

Guest appearances
- Austin Nichols as Noah Barnett; Jessalyn Gilsig as Shelley Hayes; Brad Leland as Buddy Garrity; Daniella Alonso as Carlotta Alonso; Benny Ciaramello as Santiago Herrera; Kim Smith as Lauren Davis

Episode chronology
← Previous "Pantherama!"	Next → "The Confession"
- Friday Night Lights (season 2)

"Seeing Other People" is the eighth episode of the second season of the American sports drama television series Friday Night Lights, inspired by the 1990 nonfiction book by H. G. Bissinger. It is the 30th overall episode of the series and was written by co-executive producer Elizabeth Heldens and directed by executive producer Jeffrey Reiner. It originally aired on NBC on November 30, 2007.

The series is set in the fictional town of Dillon, a small, close-knit community in rural West Texas. It follows a high school football team, the Dillon Panthers. It features a set of characters, primarily connected to Coach Eric Taylor, his wife Tami, and their daughter Julie. In the episode, Tami gets into a conflict with Julie over a rumor at school, while Eric gets jealous over Tami's friendship with Glenn. Meanwhile, Smash leaves for a potential college, Matt is conflicted over his relationship, and Tyra is asked to meet her attacker's brother.

According to Nielsen Media Research, the episode was seen by an estimated 5.47 million household viewers and gained a 1.9 ratings share among adults aged 18–49. The episode received mixed reviews from critics; while the performances were praised, the writing and character development were criticized.

== Plot ==
The Panthers get a brutal 37–0 loss against the McNulty Mavericks. During the game, Tami (Connie Britton) is concerned about Julie (Aimee Teegarden) spending so much time with Noah (Austin Nichols). When she sees he lent The World According to Garp, and threatens him into leaving her daughter alone or face consequences. Their conversation is overheard by a few students.

Smash (Gaius Charles) leaves for McNair for a possible recruitment at McNair State. While he gets along with the players, he is intimidated by one of them, Katrell (Dwayne Missouri), who does not take a liking to him. During a party with the team, Smash flirts with a girl, who kisses him back. She takes him to her dorm room, until her boyfriend arrives, revealed to be Katrell. Smash is forced to flee the campus in his underwear as Katrell loses him, telling him to never come back. He is forced to call Matt (Zach Gilford) to pick him up. On the way back to Dillon, Matt asks him about how to properly break up with Lauren (Kim Smith) due to his newfound feelings for Carlotta (Daniella Alonso). Smash says that the best way is to ask for an open relationship. Matt applies this at school, and Lauren breaks up with him.

Julie discovers that the school is now viewing Noah in a negative light due to the conversation with Tami, and she angrily accuses her of interferring in her life and ruining her friendship with Noah. Tami also gets into an argument with Eric (Kyle Chandler), who is becoming jealous of her encounters with Glenn (Steven Walters). During this, Eric tells her to focus on her family, upsetting her. Meanwhile, Tim (Taylor Kitsch) is invited by his roommate on a hunting trip, which he accepts. He starts growing a good friendship with him, especially for their love for Road House. However, Tim is annoyed when he finds that his roommate has a rolling meth lab.

Tyra (Adrianne Palicki) is approached by authorities, as Jeff Caldwell, the brother of her attacker, wants to meet her. She raises her concerns with Landry (Jesse Plemons), feeling haunted about the incident. Landry himself decides to meet with Jeff, who says that he wants to make peace with his brother's victims. When Jeff declares that his brother, Mike, was a good man despite his actions, Landry turns aggressive as he feels guilt upon learning about Mike's family. Later, Landry talks with Lyla (Minka Kelly), who advises him that the best way to move forward is by telling the truth.

Tim shows up at the field on his uniform, but Eric tells him to leave immediately. Tim ignores this and apologizes to his team for letting them down, and they accept his apology. Convinced, Eric allows him to return. That night, Eric and Tami talk, with Tami explaining that she likes hanging out with Glenn because she can have a friend at school. Eric then admits that he is not jealous of Glenn, he is actually more annoyed at them not spending more time together. Matt tells Carlotta about his break-up and explains his feelings towards her, and they end up having sex. Landry arrives at the police station, confessing that he killed Mike.

== Production ==
=== Development ===
In November 2007, NBC announced that the eighth episode of the season would be titled "Seeing Other People". The episode was written by co-executive producer Elizabeth Heldens, and directed by executive producer Jeffrey Reiner. This was Heldens' sixth writing credit, and Reiner's eleventh directing credit.

== Reception ==
=== Viewers ===
In its original American broadcast, "Seeing Other People" was seen by an estimated 5.47 million household viewers with a 1.9 in the 18–49 demographics. This means that 1.9 percent of all households with televisions watched the episode. It finished 75th out of 98 programs airing from November 26-December 2, 2007. This was a 9% decrease in viewership from the previous episode, which was watched by an estimated 5.96 million household viewers with a 2.1 in the 18–49 demographics.

=== Critical reviews ===
"Seeing Other People" received mixed reviews from critics. Eric Goldman of IGN gave the episode a "good" 7.6 out of 10 and wrote, "Ahh, Friday Night Lights, you continue to prove you can deliver the heartfelt storylines that came so easily in Season 1, yet at the same time are often still quite vexing this season thanks to other, more questionable tangents."

Scott Tobias of The A.V. Club gave the episode a "B–" grade and wrote, "There's been greatness in every episode but also sticking points minor and major, and I'm not even talking about the VBM subplot. It's been very strange and disconcerting to deal with those peaks and valleys every week, with one eye-rolling moment followed closely by another of real power and insight. This week's hour, 'Seeing Other People,' epitomized the unevenness that has plagued the show this year." Ken Tucker of Entertainment Weekly wrote, "This week's Friday Night Lights contained a series of scenes, each of which was beautifully acted and sometimes quite moving. At the same time, as lovingly crafted and executed as each individual scene was, there was a lot about this episode that just didn't make dramatic sense in the way the Friday Night Lights we love always used to make sense."

Alan Sepinwall wrote, "Just because it merits saying every week: Connie Britton is amazing. Highlights this time included her response to Eric accusing her of not spending time on the family, her tearing into Noah, the look of guilt and shame on her face as the argument with Shelley got away from her, and her joy at hearing Eric say he liked her." Leah Friedman of TV Guide wrote, "All in all, this episode left me majorly depressed. The minuses were many: The best television couple are undergoing serious marriage problems, Landry's probably going to jail and Matt's... well, he's just being a jerk."

Andrew Johnston of Slant Magazine wrote, "'Seeing Other People', like 'Pantherama!' before it, is a midseason episode with something of a holding pattern feel to in, and which places a much heavier emphasis on character than plot. Yet despite the absence of Santiago, the most intriguing character to join the show this season, 'People' was the better episode by far." Rick Porter of Zap2it wrote, "I know I was watching an episode of Friday Night Lights tonight, or at least part of one, because of the series of beautifully acted, funny, heartfelt scenes between Eric and Tami Taylor that ran throughout the hour."

Brett Love of TV Squad wrote, "I think season two is still a step off the pace of season one. That's not the worst place to be though, because I also thought that last season Friday Night Lights was the best new show of the year. With the team finally coming back together and a resolution to the murder mystery coming, hopefully the show can regain that lost step and get back to top form." Television Without Pity gave the episode a "B–" grade.
