= Are You Ready for Friday Night? =

- Friday Night Lights episode
- Episode no.: Season 2 Episode 3
- Directed by: Seith Mann
- Written by: Kerry Ehrin
- Cinematography by: David Boyd
- Editing by: Stephen Michael
- Original release date: October 19, 2007
- Running time: 43 minutes

Guest appearances
- Chris Mulkey as Coach Bill McGregor; Glenn Morshower as Chad Clarke; Brad Leland as Buddy Garrity; Daniella Alonso as Carlotta Alonso; Kevin Rankin as Herc; Brooke Langton as Jackie Miller

Episode chronology
← Previous "Bad Ideas"	Next → "Backfire"
- Friday Night Lights (season 2)

"Are You Ready for Friday Night?" is the third episode of the second season of the American sports drama television series Friday Night Lights, inspired by the 1990 nonfiction book by H. G. Bissinger. It is the 25th overall episode of the series and was written by consulting producer Kerry Ehrin and directed by Seith Mann. It originally aired on NBC on October 19, 2007.

The series is set in the fictional town of Dillon, a small, close-knit community in rural West Texas. It follows a high school football team, the Dillon Panthers. It features a set of characters, primarily connected to Coach Eric Taylor, his wife Tami, and their daughter Julie. In the episode, Eric is approached by Buddy for a new idea, while Matt and Smash face off in the field. Meanwhile, Tim discovers a secret from Billy, and Landry's father questions his son's relationship.

According to Nielsen Media Research, the episode was seen by an estimated 5.37 million household viewers and gained a 1.9 ratings share among adults aged 18–49. The episode received generally positive reviews from critics, who praised the performances, but criticized the pacing and under-developed subplots.

== Plot ==
After having sex, Tyra (Adrianne Palicki) tells Landry (Jesse Plemons) that it cannot happen again, and leaves through his bedroom's window. Unaware to them, Chad (Glenn Morshower) sees her leaving. During practice, Tim (Taylor Kitsch) falls unconscious due to dehydration.

Eric (Kyle Chandler) returns to Dillon after a rough experience in Austin, and decides to hang out with Buddy (Brad Leland). Buddy asks Eric to reconsider his new job, as he feels McGregor (Chris Mulkey) is ruining the team with his tactics and harsh methods, claiming he can get rid of him. Matt (Zach Gilford) tries to get Smash (Gaius Charles) to talk with McGregor, but he is not interested in speaking on their behalf. Matt also tells Eric about his break-up with Julie (Aimee Teegarden), something that she never discussed with him nor Tami (Connie Britton).

After his release from the hospital, Tim decides to not go to practice and spends his day drinking beer. Jason (Scott Porter) visits him to make him consider returning, but Tim is not interested after McGregor kept pushing him. Tim discovers that Billy (Derek Phillips) is now in a relationship with Jackie (Brooke Langton). When he confronts him, Billy calls him out for aiming at an impossible relationship, and Tim storms off. He attends a church ceremony, joining Lyla (Minka Kelly) after previously rejecting her offer. Tim visits her at home, where he states that getting close to her makes him closer to God. He kisses her but she rejects his statements, and forces him to leave.

Landry is concerned that his watch has been left with the corpse, and Chad is asking for him to wear it as it belonged to their family for 60 years. He is forced to buy a similar watch with Tyra's help. When his son does not open up about his encounter, Chad pays a visit to Tyra at Applebee's, questioning what she sees in his son. That night, Julie decides to go out with the Swede (Shakey Graves), angering her mother as she arrives until 2 a.m. Finding her kissing the Swede in his van, an angry Tami forces her out of the car and scolds her for her behavior. When Julie insults her, Tami slaps her, prompting Julie to finally express that she feels isolated now that she focuses on Gracie.

The Panthers have their first game of the season against the South Milbank Rattlers, but McGregor constantly ignores Jason's advices and decides to prioritize Smash. Smash scores a touchdown, but upsets Matt when he mocks his performance in the game, causing Matt to attack him in the field. Eric witnesses this, and leaves in disappointment. Jason visits Tim, announcing that he has quit the team, will leave for Mexico to get a surgery and labels Tim as a bad friend. Tim takes an interest in his trip, and decides to accompany him. Matt goes home, where Carlotta (Daniella Alonso) consoles him. Eric visits Buddy at his dealership, telling him he agrees to his plan in getting rid of McGregor.

== Production ==
=== Development ===
In September 2007, NBC announced that the third episode of the season would be titled "Are You Ready for Friday Night?". The episode was written by consulting producer Kerry Ehrin and directed by Seith Mann. This was Ehrin's fifth writing credit, and Mann's first directing credit.

== Reception ==
=== Viewers ===
In its original American broadcast, "Are You Ready for Friday Night?" was seen by an estimated 5.37 million household viewers with a 1.9 in the 18–49 demographics. This means that 1.9 percent of all households with televisions watched the episode. It finished 75th out of 97 programs airing from October 15–21, 2007. This was a slight decrease in viewership from the previous episode, which was watched by an estimated 5.46 million household viewers with a 1.9 in the 18–49 demographics.

=== Critical reviews ===
"Are You Ready for Friday Night?" received generally positive reviews from critics. Eric Goldman of IGN gave the episode a "good" 7.8 out of 10 and wrote, "We love these characters and the show still is doing a strong and believable job portraying their lives for the most part. But it seems like the producers have taken their ability to craft involving and touching stories to the nth degree in terms of bringing out the dark nature. Here's hoping Dillon gets some good times soon. Maybe the return of our favorite coach can do the trick?"

Scott Tobias of The A.V. Club gave the episode a "B–" grade and wrote, "Judging by tonight's disappointing episode, Mrs. Coach ain't the only one who needs her man back to restore some order in the Friday Night Lights universe."

Alan Sepinwall wrote, "I wish Katims and company had taken advantage of last season's ambiguous ending and come back with Coach having turned down the TMU job. It takes him out of the central action and turns the early episodes into one big contrivance to get him back to the Panthers sideline. And while these episodes have served as an illustration of Coach's importance to the team and his family - who are both falling apart, violently, in his absence - all the conflict feels artificial." Leah Friedman of TV Guide wrote, "There was so many smackdowns (verbal and physical) tonight, that I think I'm forming bruises in sympathy. What does it say about a show when the characters who are doing the best at the moment are the ones who recently committed murder?"

Andrew Johnston of Slant Magazine wrote, "I really loved 'Last Days of Summer', and I think that anyone who considers 'Bad Ideas' a shark jumper is being premature, but this week's episode — by no means a bad one — makes it hard to deny that the writers are still in housekeeping mode as they continue dealing with the consequences of having had to make sure that last season's 'State' could have served, if necessary, as a series finale as well as a season-ender." Rick Porter of Zap2it wrote, "The Incident faded to the background some this week, which may be another reason why this episode felt more comfortable. Still, Tyra and Landry had a very tender scene at the end, and I also really enjoyed the tension between Tyra and Landry's dad at the restaurant."

Brett Love of TV Squad wrote, "Overall, this was an excellent episode. There was just so much going on. With this installment, season two is now in full swing. All of our major players are now moving forward, for better or worse depending on their stories, and for the most part, this feels like the Friday Night Lights of season one." Television Without Pity gave the episode a "B+" grade.
