= Seeing Other People =

Seeing Other People may refer to:

- Seeing Other People (album), a 2019 album by Foxygen
- Seeing Other People (film), a 2004 film
- "Seeing Other People" (song), a 2020 song by MacKenzie Porter
- "Seeing Other People", a song by Belle and Sebastian from their 1996 album If You're Feeling Sinister
- Seeing Other People (Friday Night Lights), an episode of the TV series Friday Night Lights
