= I Knew You When (Friday Night Lights) =

- Friday Night Lights episode
- Episode no.: Season 3 Episode 1
- Directed by: Jeffrey Reiner
- Written by: Jason Katims
- Cinematography by: Todd McMullen
- Editing by: Angela M. Catanzaro
- Original release dates: October 1, 2008 (DirecTV); January 16, 2009 (NBC)
- Running time: 47 minutes

Guest appearances
- Gaius Charles as Smash Williams; D. W. Moffett as Joe McCoy; Jeremy Sumpter as J.D. McCoy; Brad Leland as Buddy Garrity; Dana Wheeler-Nicholson as Angela Collette

Episode chronology
← Previous "May the Best Man Win"	Next → "Tami Knows Best"
- Friday Night Lights (season 3)

"I Knew You When" is the first episode of the third season of the American sports drama television series Friday Night Lights, inspired by the 1990 nonfiction book by H. G. Bissinger. It is the 38th overall episode of the series and was written by executive producer Jason Katims, and directed by executive producer Jeffrey Reiner. It originally aired on DirecTV's 101 Network on October 1, 2008, before airing on NBC on January 16, 2009.

The series is set in the fictional town of Dillon, a small, close-knit community in rural West Texas. It follows a high school football team, the Dillon Panthers. It features a set of characters, primarily connected to Coach Eric Taylor, his wife Tami, and their daughter Julie. In the episode, changes happen across Dillon in the aftermath of the previous football season.

According to Nielsen Media Research, the episode was seen by an estimated 4.54 million household viewers and gained a 1.6/5 ratings share among adults aged 18–49. The episode received very positive reviews from critics, who praised the episode as a return to form following the previous season.

== Plot ==
Eric (Kyle Chandler) is questioned over a press conference, which reveals that the Panthers lost their first playoff game and now Smash (Gaius Charles) has graduated. While the team still has Matt (Zach Gilford) and Tim (Taylor Kitsch), some are speculating that the new arrival, J.D. McCoy (Jeremy Sumpter), could be the new quarterback.

Tami (Connie Britton) now works as the high school principal, but she is overwhelmed by the amount of tasks and the lack of funds are forcing budget cuts across the school. She is also frustrated that Buddy (Brad Leland) wants to use some of their funds for an expensive jumbotron. Eric continues training Smash, as he wants to give him good tactics before he leaves. Eric is also visited by J.D.'s father, Joe (D. W. Moffett), who tries to buy J.D.'s participation with gifts, which Eric refuses. Tim and Lyla (Minka Kelly) have resumed their relationship, although Tim is annoyed that Lyla wants to keep it a secret at school. She finally admits it is because she is scared by his unruly lifestyle and his never taking anything seriously, thus still feeling they cannot have a real relationship.

Landry (Jesse Plemons) and Tyra (Adrianne Palicki) have broken up, but remain close friends. Tyra is informed that her poor GPA won't get her in a top state school, and that she might have to try to get into the local Dillon Tech. When Landry informs her that her incoming semester won't be enough to change the status, she is upset with Tami, who said she didn't have to worry about it. When her sister accepts to marry Billy (Derek Phillips), Tyra asks for Tami to help her in her grades, as she doesn't want to have a life like her sister and mother.

On Friday, Smash tells Eric that he will stop coming to train, as he feels his future is not as bright as he thought due to a knee injury in the playoff game killing his scholarship. During their first game, the Panthers easily dominate over their competitors. At the third quarter, Eric decides to replace Matt with J.D., who surprises the crowd by throwing a perfect 70-yard pass. At the celebration, Tami informs Buddy that she will reallocate the funds for the jumbotron in order to get more academic needs for students and teachers. Tim tells Lyla that he thought about her statements and resolved that he wants to seriously commit to her, to which Lyla finally gives in and makes their relationship official by kissing him in public for the first time. Eric gets Smash to play racquetball, telling him that he needs to get his interest in football back.

== Production ==
=== Development ===
In September 2008, DirecTV announced that the first episode of the season would be titled "I Knew You When". The episode was written by executive producer Jason Katims, and directed by executive producer Jeffrey Reiner. This was Katims' sixth writing credit, and Reiner's 14th directing credit.

== Reception ==
=== Viewers ===
In its original American broadcast on NBC, "I Knew You When" was seen by an estimated 4.54 million household viewers with a 1.6/5 in the 18–49 demographics. This means that 1.6 percent of all households with televisions watched the episode, while 5 percent of all of those watching television at the time of the broadcast watched it. This was a 14% decrease in viewership from the previous episode, which was watched by an estimated 5.22 million household viewers with a 1.7/5 in the 18–49 demographics.

=== Critical reviews ===
"I Knew You When" received very positive reviews from critics. Eric Goldman of IGN gave the episode a "great" 8.3 out of 10 and wrote, "All in all, this is a much better premiere than Season 2 offered – there's certainly nothing worrisome beginning, like that Landry/Tyra murder storyline. Instead, we simply catch up with the people of Dillon and are reminded of how much we've come to care about them. That includes Buddy Garrity, who has some wonderfully Buddy moments here, including the proclamation, "Love and football are the two greatest things in the world.""

Keith Phipps of The A.V. Club gave the episode a "B+" grade and wrote, "If the episode had a problem it was only that there was a lot of exposition to get out of the way. Much of the hour was about bringing viewers back up to speed. I'm looking forward to seeing where it goes from here." Ken Tucker of Entertainment Weekly wrote, "We're off to a great season, by which I mean most major characters are unhappy (yet wry and funny), the series seems as grungily authentic as ever, and while I don't care for the new short, curly hairdo Tyra is sporting, maybe I'll get used to it."

Alan Sepinwall wrote, "You all remember the problems I had with season two, and there's no need to rehash them here. While there was nothing in 'I Knew You When' that gave me the goosebumps in the same way I got them from, say, Street getting his helmet cut off in the hospital, or Coach talking Saracen into being confident enough to play QB1, or Tami having The Talk with Julie, this still felt very much like an episode set in the same universe as the first season, where too much of season two seemed to be taking place in a parallel world where the faces were the same but nothing was quite right." Erin Fox of TV Guide wrote, "When Smash asks why he's doing this, Coach simply says, "I need something good to happen." He leaves Smash to think about his future, and leaves me wanting more Friday Night Lights."

Jonathan Pacheco of Slant Magazine wrote, "I enjoyed many of the understated visual choices in the premiere. The juxtaposed clips from the news conference, as well as an attempt at a hand-held rendition of a dolly zoom during the closing minutes of the football game. I've never seen a rugged version like that done on TV before." Daniel Fienberg of Zap2it wrote, "Friday Night Lights isn't exactly starting from scratch, but it's definitely wiped the slate mostly clean. The result was a premiere episode that was better than most of last season, but not close to the quality of the first set of episodes."

Allison Waldman of TV Squad wrote, "The best thing about Friday Night Lights, in fact, is that the show is only set in a sports environment. The drama is much more than who wins or loses a game, and that's what stays with you. There are no easy answers for Eric and Tami, Tyra and Landry, Tim and Lyla. Even Buddy has ambiguities." Television Without Pity gave the episode an "A+" grade.
