= Past Life (TV series) =

2010 TV drama series

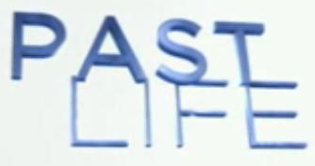
- Genre: Police procedural Fantasy
- Created by: David Hudgins
- Starring: Kelli Giddish; Nicholas Bishop; Richard Schiff; Ravi Patel
- Theme music composer: John Nordstrom
- Composers: Jon Ehrlich; Jason Derlatka
- Country of origin: United States
- Original language: English
- No. of seasons: 1
- No. of episodes: 7 (2 unaired)

Production
- Production locations: Atlanta, Georgia
- Running time: 60 minutes
- Production companies: Hudgins Productions; Pitt Group; Bonanza Productions; Warner Bros. Television

Original release
- Network: Fox
- Release: February 9 – June 4, 2010

Past Life is an American crime drama fantasy television series which aired on Fox from February 9 to June 4, 2010. The series premiered on Tuesday, February 9 at 9:00 pm Eastern/8:00 pm Central. After the premiere, subsequent airings were broadcast on Thursdays beginning February 11, during the 9:00 pm Eastern/8:00 pm Central timeslot.

== Cast ==
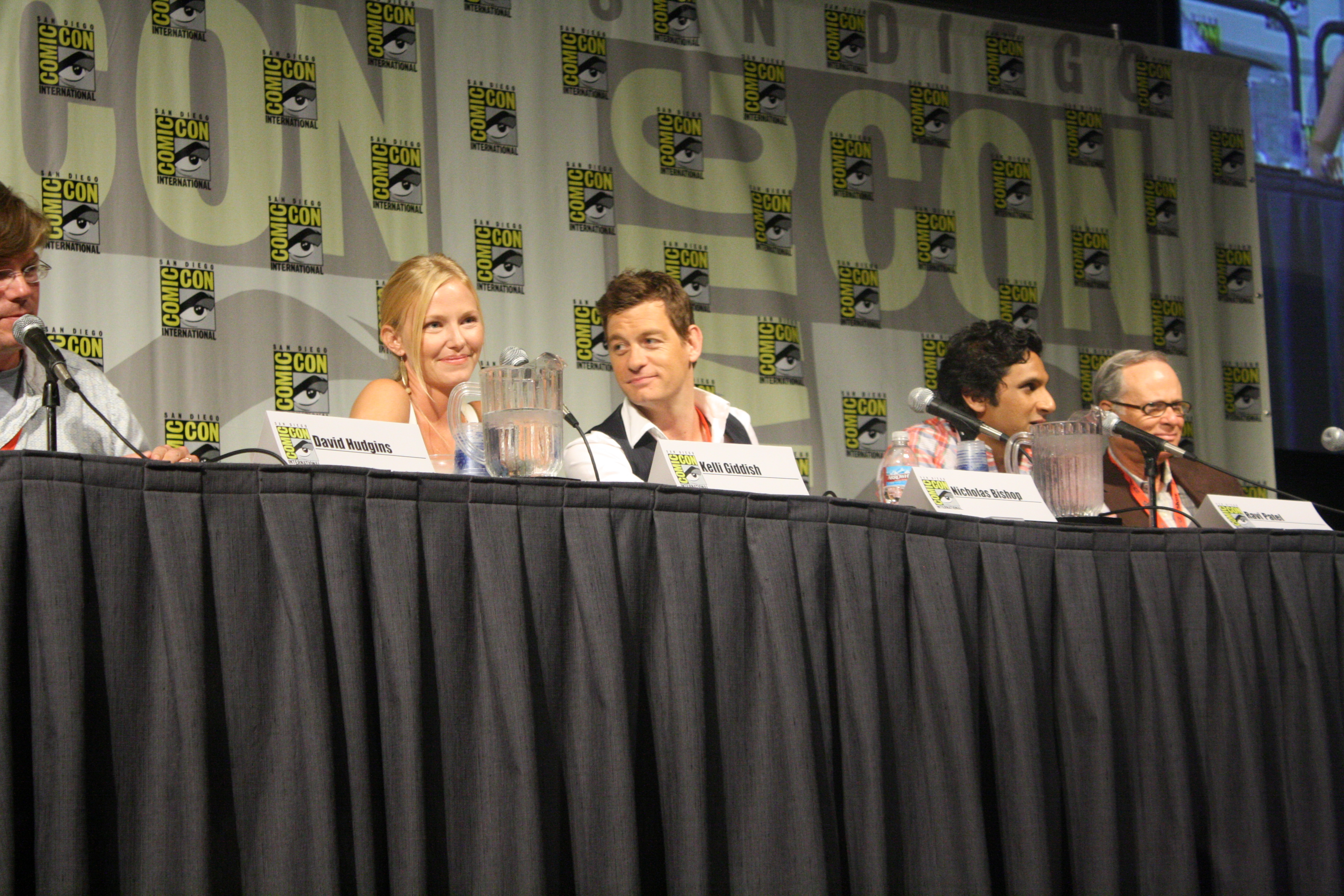
Past Life television show panel at Comic Con 2009. Left to right: executive producer David Hudgins, actors Kelli Giddish, Nicholas Bishop, Ravi Patel, executive producer Lou Pitt.

- Kelli Giddish as Dr. Kate McGinn
- Nicholas Bishop as Price Whatley
- Richard Schiff as Dr. Malachi Talmadge
- Ravi Patel as Dr. Rishi Karna

== Production ==
The series was created by David Hudgins and inspired by the 2007 book The Reincarnationist, a crime thriller by M. J. Rose, whose main character, Josh Ryder, solves a 21st-century crime with memories and clues from his past life in ancient Rome.

Although seven episodes were produced, the series was canceled after three episodes aired due to rapidly declining ratings. Fox aired the remaining episodes of Past Life from May 28 until June 4, 2010. On June 8, 2010, Fox announced that they would not air the final two episodes of Past Life.

== Episodes ==
No.	Title	Directed by	Written by	Original release date	Prod. code	U.S. viewers (millions)
1	"Pilot"	Deran Sarafian	David Hudgins	February 9, 2010	2J5101	9.07
Dr. Kate McGinn and her partner, former detective Price Whatley, help Noah (Cayden Boyd), a teenager who suffers from repressed memories from a past life. Meanwhile Dr. Malachi Talmadge and Dr. Rishi Karna, McGinn and Whatley go in pursuit of a criminal.
2	"Dead Man Talking"	Kate Woods	Dave Andron	February 11, 2010	2J5105	5.31
The team meets a young woman named Corrine, who is dealing with addiction. While Corrine is in a regression state, some details of a violent crime are discovered. Then Kate and Price hope to uncover Corrine's involvement in that crime, which could help an innocent death row prisoner from his execution.
3	"Soul Music"	Steven DePaul	Sam Humphrey	February 18, 2010	2J5106	3.49
Two people share the same regression episode and the team discover that the couple are star-crossed lovers who rediscover their love. But the team must keep the pair from fulfilling their own destructive pattern.
4	"Saint Sarah"	Dean White	Natalie Chaidez	May 28, 2010	2J5103	2.32
Sarah, a young girl who is named a saint by the media, when she manifests physical traumatic past-life memories. She is brought to the team and then she goes from saint to sinner, when the case leads Kate and Price to a serial killer.
5	"Gone Daddy Gone"	Deran Sarafian	David Hudgins	June 4, 2010	2J5102	2.01
When an office worker with no previous psychiatric history is accused of stealing, he erupts in a violent outburst, forcing his co-workers to call in the Talmadge team. Kate and Price travel with their patient to Texas only to discover he was involved in a violent crime in a past life.
6	"Running On Empty"	N/A	N/A	Unaired	2J5107	N/A
7	"All Fall Down"	N/A	N/A	Unaired	2J5104	N/A

== International broadcast ==
In the Netherlands the series aired with Human Target on RTL 5 every Thursday. In Portugal the series aired on Fox Life Portugal throughout July and August 2010. In Spain the series aired on laSexta every Sunday until the episode "All Fall Down". In Italy the series aired on Rai 2 starting from Sunday, January 9, 2011. In Croatia the series aired on Doma TV starting from Friday, June 16, 2011. In Bulgaria the series aired on bTV Cinema starting from September 8, 2012, at 20:00.
