= Darkness Falls (2020 film) =

Film by Julien Seri

- Directed by: Julien Seri
- Written by: Giles Daoust
- Produced by: Luke Barnett; Giles Daoust; Mike Macari; Vincent Masciale; Catherine Dumonceaux; Timothy Kerigan
- Starring: Shawn Ashmore; Gary Cole; Daniella Alonso
- Cinematography: Shan Likjestrand
- Edited by: Brody Gusar
- Music by: Sacha Chaban
- Production companies: Title Media; Lone Suspect; WTFilms; Koji Productions
- Distributed by: WTFilms; Defiant Screen Entertainment; Film1; Splendid Film
- Release date: June 12, 2020 (United States)
- Running time: 84 minutes
- Language: English

Darkness Falls is a 2020 crime thriller film directed by Julien Seri, starring Shawn Ashmore, Gary Cole and Daniella Alonso.

== Plot ==
After his wife's (Vahina Giocante) apparent suicide, Detective Jeff Anderson (Shawn Ashmore) becomes convinced that she has been murdered and sets out to stop the killer(s). When he asks his boss, Kelly Alderman (Daniella Alonso), for assistance she expresses doubt that his suspicions are true and initially refuses help.

Working alone, Anderson researches a theory leading him to believe serial killer(s) have murdered several women over the past 10 years by faking suicides. He explains to Alderman that the killer(s) first drug the victims, then put them in a bathtub and cut their wrists.

Obsessed with his investigation, he soon discovers that the serial killers are father-son team Mark and Adam Witver (Gary Cole and Richard Harmon).

== Cast ==
- Shawn Ashmore as Jeff Anderson
- Gary Cole as Mark Witver
- Richard Harmon as Adam Witver
- Daniella Alonso as Kelly Alderman
- Judah Mackey as Frankie Anderson
- Sonya Walger as Jane Wilson
- Vahina Giocante as Elizabeth Anderson
- Lin Shaye as Angela Anderson
- Stefania Spampinato as Amanda Tyler
- David Gianopoulos as Officer Walker
- Aliza Pearl as Officer Pearl

== Critical reception ==
Anton Bitel of SciFiNow wrote that while the film "comes very slickly packaged", the dialogue is "perfunctory at best", the "cat-and-mouse, cop vs killer mechanics are entirely generic" and the female characters are "mere foils for Jeff".

Jeffrey Anderson of Common Sense Media rated the film 1 star out of 5 and wrote that Seri "has delivered a good-looking Los Angeles noir that quickly becomes nearly unwatchable, thanks to wonky dialogue, shrill performances, a flat story, and overbearing music."

Sheila O'Malley of RogerEbert.com rated the film 1 star out of 4 and called the film a "bizarre series of cliché after cliché, with no real work done to fill in the blanks with complexity, nuance, or even basic human reality."
