= The Last Whistle =

- Directed by: Rob Smat
- Written by: Rob Smat
- Produced by: Mike Downing; H. Max Gonzalez; Thomas Kutzler
- Starring: Brad Leland; Jim O'Heir; Les Miles; Eric Nelsen
- Cinematography: Brian Tang
- Edited by: Carter Feuerhelm
- Music by: Logan Austin
- Production company: Smatfilms
- Distributed by: Vertical Entertainment
- Release date: June 28, 2019 (United States)
- Running time: 88 minutes
- Country: United States
- Language: English

The Last Whistle is an American sports drama film, written and directed by Rob Smat. It stars Brad Leland as a stern football coach who must contend with tragedy after a player's death from hypertrophic cardiomyopathy.

It was released on June 28, 2019 by Vertical Entertainment.

== Cast ==
- Brad Leland as Coach Victor Trenton
- Jim O'Heir as Ted
- Les Miles as Billy
- Eric Nelsen as Greg Reid
- Fred Tolliver, Jr. as Benny
- Deanne Lauvin as Theresa
- Tyler Perez as Mark
- Sainty Nelsen as Sarah Trenton
- Chelly as Ford

== Production ==
In May 2018, it was announced Brad Leland, Jim O'Heir, Les Miles, and Eric Nelsen joined the cast of the film, with Rob Smat directing from his own screenplay. The film was shot on location in Fort Worth, Texas. The film marks one of the rare acting appearances of former national championship winning football coach Les Miles.

== Release ==
In November 2018, the film premiered as the opening night film of Fort Worth's Lone Star Film Festival. In February 2019, Vertical Entertainment acquired distribution rights to the film. It was released on June 28, 2019.
