= Carter Harris =

American journalist, screenwriter, and producer

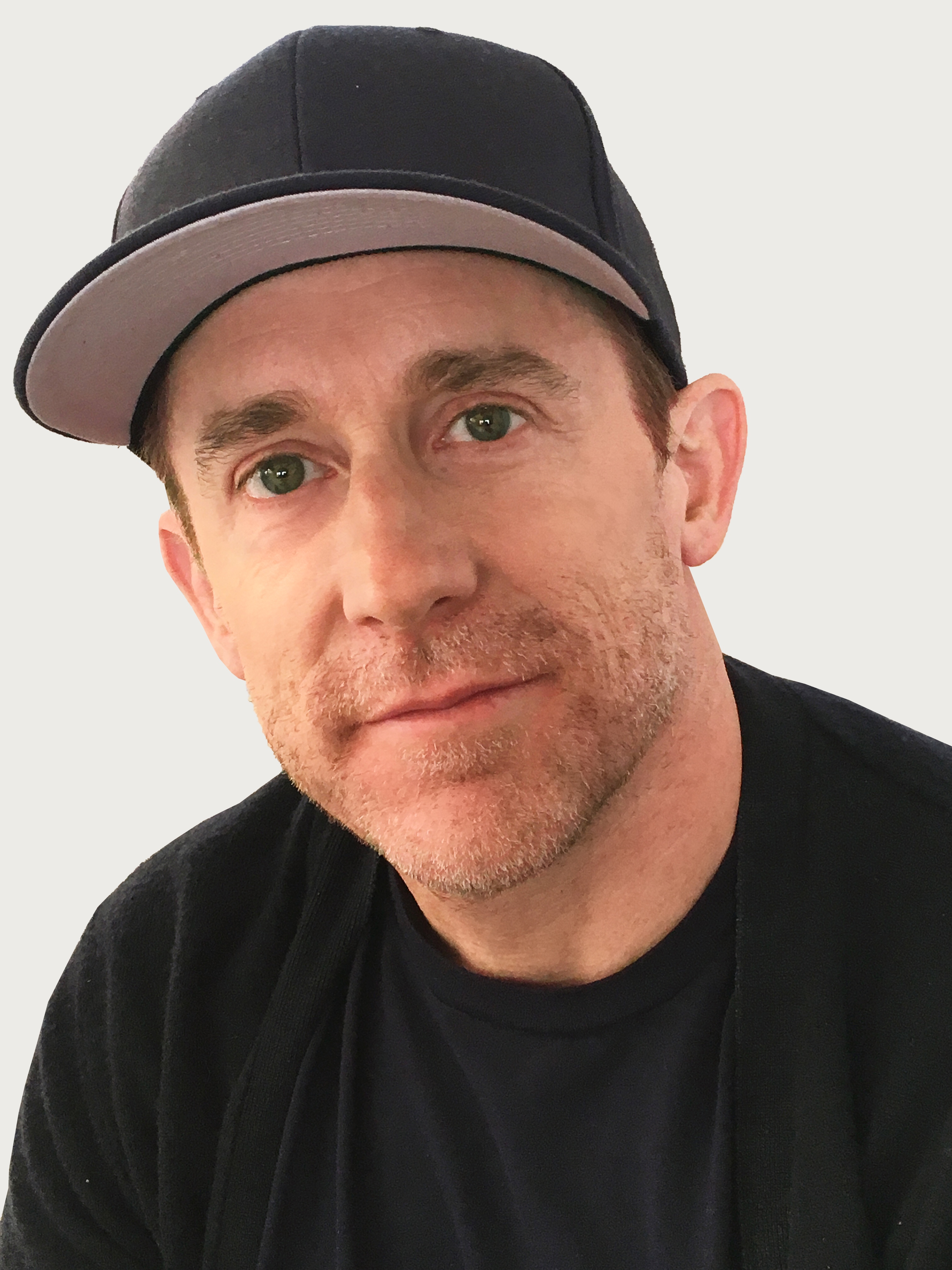
Carter Harris in 2018

Carter Harris is an American journalist, screenwriter, producer, and director.

Harris began his career as a reporter for the San Francisco Bay Guardian and went on to write for various publications, including Esquire, The New York Times, New York Magazine, Details, Spin, Rolling Stone, Elle, Vibe, and The Source, where he won the ASCAP Deems Taylor Award. Harris was executive editor of Vibe magazine and a Fellow in the National Arts Journalism Program at Columbia University. He is an adjunct professor of Dramatic Writing at NYU Tisch School of the Arts.

Harris moved into screenwriting when Michael Mann hired him to write a movie and then hired him on CBS's Robbery Homicide Division. Harris has since written and produced for numerous TV shows, including Dick Wolf's Law & Order, FX's Lights Out, NBC's Friday Night Lights, Netflix's Bloodline, HBO's Ballers, and Apple TV's The New Look. He is currently developing a series for MGM and Jamie Foxx.

Harris was nominated for a Writers Guild of America Award for Television: New Series for his work on the first season of Bloodline. He was nominated for a Writers Guild of America Award for Best New Series for his work on the first season of Friday Night Lights. He was nominated for the WGA Award for Best Dramatic Series for his work on the second season of Friday Night Lights. He was nominated for the same award the following year for his work on the third season of Friday Night Lights.
