= Dean White (director) =

American television director and producer

- Occupations: Television director and producer
- Years active: 1988–present

Dean White is an American television director and producer.

== Career ==
Some of his directorial credits include: The Shield, Thief, The Unit, Saved, Friday Night Lights, Men in Trees, The Mentalist, CSI: Crime Scene Investigation, Pushing Daisies, Prison Break, Detroit 1-8-7, Law & Order, Past Life, Law & Order: Criminal Intent, V,Once Upon a Time and The 100.

He has produced the series: The Shield, Chicago Hope, The District, and Past Life.

== Filmography ==
Year	Title	Director	Producer	Writer	Notes
1996–2000	Chicago Hope		Yes		Associate producer (26 episodes) and co-producer (6 episodes)
2000–2001	The District		Co-producer		22 episodes
2004–2008	The Shield	Yes	Yes		Directed 7 episodes
2005	Over There	Yes			Episode "Suicide Rain"
2005	E-Ring	Yes			Episode "The Forgotten"
2006	Thief	Yes			2 episodes
2006	CSI: Crime Scene Investigation	Yes			Episode "Time of Your Death"
2006	Prison Break	Yes			Episode "Go"
2006	Saved	Yes			2 episodes
2006	The Nine	Yes			Episode "Outsiders"
2007	Dirt	Yes			Episode "The Thing Under the Bed"
2007	Six Degrees	Yes			Episode "Slings and Arrows"
2007	Law & Order: Criminal Intent	Yes			Episode "Silencer"
2007	Saving Grace	Yes			Episode "Bless Me, Father, for I Have Sinned"
2007	Shark	Yes			Episode "Ever Breath You Take"
2007–2008	Men in Trees	Yes			3 episodes
2007–2009	The Unit	Yes			2 episodes
2008	Law & Order	Yes			Episode "Tango"
2008	The Cleaner	Yes			Episode "The Catch a Fed"
2008	Friday Night Lights	Yes			2 episodes
2008	Dirty Sexy Money	Yes			Episode "The Injured Party"
2009	The Mentalist	Yes			Episode "Red Rum"
2009	Pushing Daisies	Yes			Episode "Water & Power"
2009	Castle	Yes			Episode "Home Is Where the Heart Stops"
2010	Past Life	Yes	Yes		Directed 3 episodes
2010	My Generation	Yes			Episode "Truth an Reconciliation"
2010	Chase	Yes			Episode "Crazy Love"
2010–2011	V	Yes			2 episodes
2010–2011	Detroit 1-8-7	Yes			2 episodes
2011	Pretty Little Liars	Yes			Episode "Blind Dates"
2011–2016	Once Upon a Time	Yes			11 episodes
2012	The River	Yes			Episode "A Better Man"
2012	666 Park Avenue	Yes			Episode "What Ever Happened to Baby Jane?"
2013	Banshee	Yes			Episode "Behold a Pale Rider"
2014–2020	The 100	Yes	Yes		Directed 24 episodes; Also supervising producer, executive producer and co-executive producer
2015	Zoo	Yes			Episode "Sleuths"
2017	Searchers	Yes	Executive		TV movie
2018–2019, 2021–2022	Manifest	Yes			4 episodes
2018–2020	Siren		Exeucutive	Yes	Also creator
2019	Stumptown	Yes			Episode "Rip City Dicks"
2019–2020	Blue Bloods	Yes			2 episodes

Acting roles

Year	Title	Role	Notes
1988	Without Consent	Mike	
2001	The West Wing	Aide	Episode "The Women of Qumar"

Other credits

Year	Title	Role	Notes
1991	Dead Silence	Set Production Assistant	TV movie
1991-1993	Reasonable Doubts	Production Assistant	41 episodes
1995–1996	Charlie Grace	Post-production supervisor	6 episodes
2003	Twelve Mile Road	Post-production supervisor	TV movie
2005	Suzanne's Diary for Nicholas	Post-production supervisor	TV movie
