= David Hudgins =

American television writer and producer

- Born: 1965 (age 60–61); Durham, North Carolina
- Education: Duke University
- Occupations: Television writer and producer

David Hudgins (born 1965 in Durham, North Carolina) is an American television writer and showrunner. He has worked on Everwood, Friday Night Lights, Parenthood, and Shut Eye. He created the drama series Past Life and Game of Silence.

== Career ==
Hudgins is a graduate of St. Mark's School of Texas, Duke University, and the Dedman School of Law at Southern Methodist University. He practiced law in Dallas, Texas, before moving to Los Angeles, California, to become a screenwriter. In 2003, Hudgins began his career as a staff writer on Warner Bros. Television show Everwood, where he worked for three years until the show's cancellation in May 2006. He rose to the position of co-producer and wrote eleven episodes over the course of three seasons, including the series finale "Foreverwood, Pt. II".

In 2006, Hudgins moved to the NBC show Friday Night Lights as a writer and Supervising Producer, writing the episodes "Homecoming", "Upping The Ante", and "Mud Bowl". He was nominated along with the rest of the show's writing staff for a Writers Guild of America Award for Best New Series at the February 2007 ceremony for his work on the first season of Friday Night Lights. He was nominated for the WGA Award for Best Dramatic Series the following year at the February 2008 ceremony for his work on the second season of Friday Night Lights. He was nominated for Best Dramatic Series a second time at the February 2009 ceremony for his work on the third season of Friday Night Lights. He was nominated for the WGA Award for Best Drama Series for the third consecutive year at the February 2010 ceremony for his work on the fourth season. He also won a Peabody Award for Excellence in Television in 2011 and in Season 5, when he was Co-Showrunner, Friday Night Lights was nominated for an Emmy for Best Drama Series.

In 2010, Hudgins created the drama series Past Life, which aired on Fox. In fall 2010, he joined the staff of the NBC drama series Parenthood as an executive producer and writer. The series was created by his Friday Night Lights executive producer, Jason Katims. In 2012, Hudgins renewed his overall deal with NBC Universal Television. In 2014, he signed a new overall deal and moved to Sony Pictures Television, where he currently works. In his first two years at Sony, Hudgins created the drama series Game of Silence, which aired on NBC. Carol Mendelsohn was his fellow executive producer. He also signed a deal to develop Greg Iles' novel Natchez Burning into a television series for Amazon, with Tobey Maguire as executive producer.

Hudgins is a frequent guest speaker, and delivered the keynote address at The Presbyterian HealthCare Foundation's "Each Moment Matters" luncheon that celebrated the opening of the T. Boone Pickens Hospice and Palliative Care Center in Dallas, Texas. Hudgins has stated that he was inspired to quit the practice of law and try screenwriting by the 2001 death of his older sister from breast cancer. In 2013, he founded the Catherine H. Tuck Foundation in her honor. He is president of the charity which provides financial assistance to women in need who have been diagnosed with breast cancer.

In 2016, Hudgins was executive producer and showrunner of the first season of the drama series Shuteye, which aired on Hulu. The show was renewed for a second season but Hudgins stepped down to focus on other projects.

Hudgins is a member of the Advisory Council for the Humanitas Prize, which recognizes 'excellence' in writing for both film and television. He has twice served as emcee of The Humanitas Awards ceremony, held annually in Los Angeles. He is also on the advisory board of the Austin Television Festival (ATX) and has been a recurring moderator and panelist.

He was most recently the showrunner of FBI: Most Wanted on CBS.

== See also ==
- Notable alumni of St. Mark's School of Texas
