= Daniella Alonso =

American film and television actress

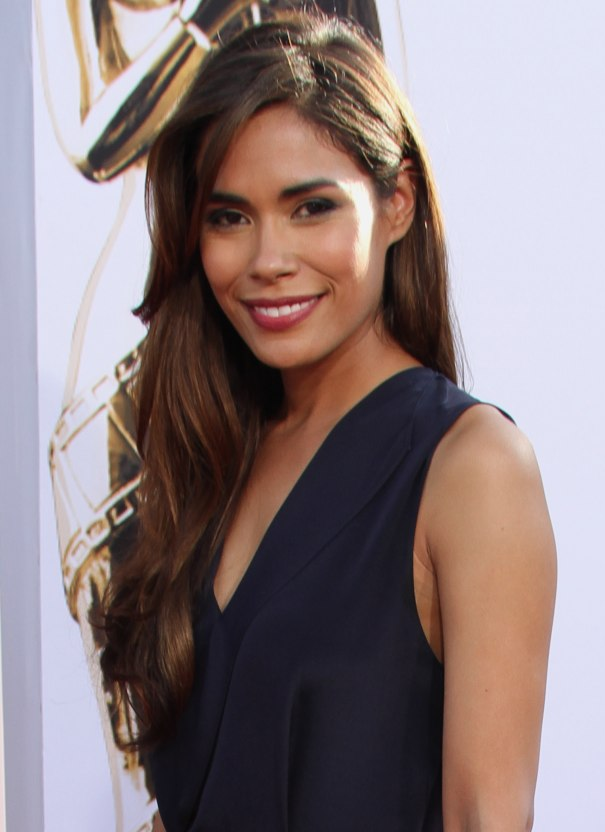
- Alonso at the October 2014 Alma Awards
- Occupations: Actress; fashion model
- Years active: 1997–present
- Children: 1

Daniella Alonso is an American actress and former fashion model. She has appeared in a number of horror films, including The Hills Have Eyes 2 and Wrong Turn 2: Dead End (both 2007). Alonso was a regular cast member in the NBC post-apocalyptic series Revolution from 2012 to 2013, and the medical drama The Night Shift in 2014. Alonso also appeared in the first season of the TNT crime drama Animal Kingdom in 2016, and in 2019 began starring as Cristal Flores in the third season of the prime time soap opera Dynasty, which aired on The CW.

== Early life ==
Alonso grew up in New York City and is of Puerto Rican, Peruvian, and Japanese heritage. She has stated that she "grew up in a pretty much all woman household in NYC", but added that her father, grandfather and uncles had "strong influences" in her life as well.

Alonso has a brother. She has participated in karate, in which she holds a fourth level green belt. She loves animals and supports PETA, posing in a 2013 advertising campaign that asked consumers to wear synthetic leather.

Discovered by the Ford Modeling Agency, Alonso began booking jobs for teen magazines like Seventeen, YM, and Teen, which led to her booking commercials for Clairol, CoverGirl, Clean & Clear, Kmart, Target, Footlocker, Volkswagen, and others. She has also done over thirty national commercials and at least twenty Spanish market advertisements.

== Career ==
In television, Alonso began her career with guest appearances on Law & Order and As the World Turns. She had her first break with a recurring role as Anna Taggaro in Season 2 of The WB drama series One Tree Hill (2004–05). She then began appearing in a number of horror movies, including Hood of Horror (2006), The Hills Have Eyes 2 (2007), Wrong Turn 2: Dead End (2007), and The Collector (2009). She has also had guest appearances in CSI: Crime Scene Investigation, Private Practice, Rizzoli & Isles, and Castle.

In 2007, Alonso began a recurring role in the NBC drama series Friday Night Lights (2007–08) as Carlotta Alonso. In 2010, Alonso starred in the short-lived ABC drama series My Generation. From 2012 to 2013, she starred in the NBC post-apocalyptic series Revolution as Nora Clayton. Alonso later starred in the first season of another NBC series The Night Shift as Dr. Landry de la Cruz, which aired on the summer of 2014. In 2015, she had a recurring role in the BET drama series Being Mary Jane.

In 2015, Alonso starred in two films: first was Re-Kill a horror film; and the box office hit comedy Paul Blart: Mall Cop 2, opposite Kevin James.

In 2016, Alonso starred in the first season of TNT crime drama Animal Kingdom. The following year, she went to star in the ABC drama pilot Las Reinas, but it not was picked up to series.

Alonso later had recurring roles on Criminal Minds and The Resident. In 2019, she joined the cast of The CW prime time soap opera Dynasty replacing Ana Brenda Contreras in the role of Cristal Jennings.

== Personal life ==
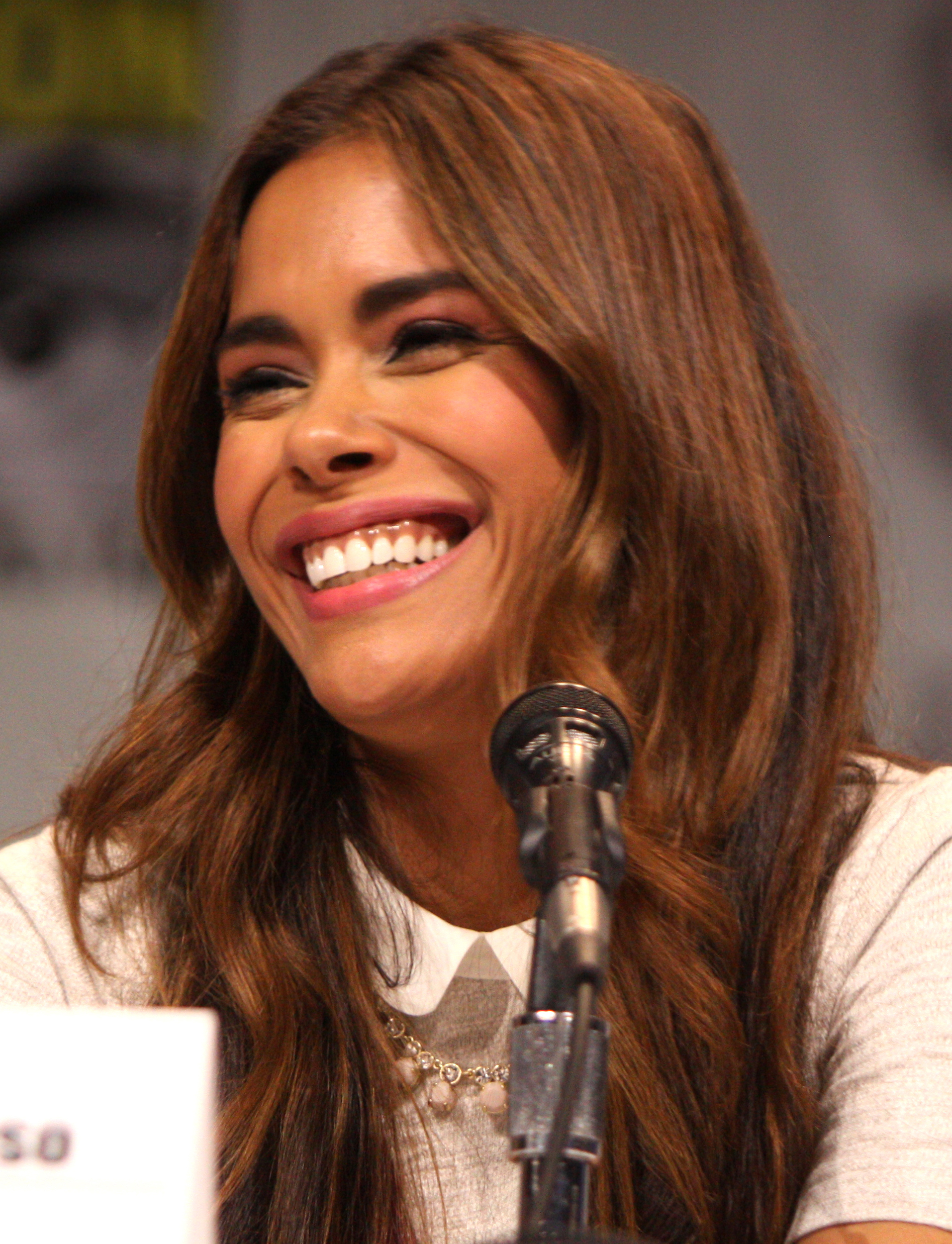
Alonso in 2013

On November 5, 2020, Alonso said on a podcast that she was pregnant with her first child with longtime boyfriend, Jeff Schine. She gave birth to a girl, Inara, in 2021.

== Filmography ==
=== Film ===
Year	Title	Role
1997	Academy Boyz	Lisa
2001	Black Knight	June
2003	Rhythm of the Saints	Rena
2006	The Last Romantic	
2006	Hood of Horror	Posie Santana
2007	The Hills Have Eyes 2	PFC Marisol 'Missy' Martinez
2007	Wrong Turn 2: Dead End	Amber
2007	A Poor Kid's Guide to Success	Nicole
2009	The Collector	Lisa O'Brien
2010	The Mulberry Tree	Maria Ramirez
2015	Paul Blart: Mall Cop 2	Divina Martinez
2015	Re-Kill	Matthews
2018	Lawless Range	Claudia Donnelly
2019	Maybe I'm Fine	Sage
2020	Darkness Falls	Kelly Alderman
2023	City Girls	Yvonne's Gateman

=== Television ===
Year	Title	Role	Notes
2001	Law & Order: Criminal Intent	Angie Suarez	Episode: "Jones"
2003	Law & Order	Maddi Donlou	Episode: "Mother's Day"
2004	As the World Turns	Pilar Domingo	Episode #1.12239
2004–2005	One Tree Hill	Anna Taggaro	Recurring cast, season 2
2006	CSI: NY	Jenny Rodriguez	Episode: "Cool Hunter"
2006	All You've Got	Rada Kincaid	TV movie
2007	CSI: Miami	Alexis Dawson	Episode: "Born to Kill"
2007	Saving Grace	Lily Blackbird	Episode: "Yeehaw, Geepaw"
2007–2008	Friday Night Lights	Carlotta Alonso	Recurring cast, season 2
2008	Stargate: Atlantis	Katana Labrea	Episode: "The Lost Tribe"
2008	Without a Trace	Dr. Erica Loza	Episode: "Push Comes to Shove"
2009	Knight Rider	Lynn	Episode: "Exit Light, Enter Knight"
2009	CSI: Crime Scene Investigation	Liz Martin/Rosa Gonzales	Episode: "Deep Fried and Minty Fresh"
2009	Medium	Elizabeth Torres	Episode: "Baby Fever"
2010	My Generation	Brenda Serrano	Main cast
2011	Mad Love	Nurse	Episode: "Friends and Other Obstacles"
2011	In Plain Sight	Sue Shears/Sue Stills	Episode: "Provo-Cation"
2012	Private Practice	Reyna Reyes	Episode: "True Colors"
2012	Rizzoli & Isles	Riley Cooper	Recurring cast, season 3
2012	Covert Affairs	Suzanne Wilkins	Recurring cast, season 3
2012–2014	Revolution	Nora Clayton	Main cast, season 1; Guest, season 2
2014	The Night Shift	Dr. Landry de la Cruz	Main cast, season 1
2014	Castle	Maria Sanchez	Episode: "The Time of Our Lives"
2015	Major Crimes	Lori Weber	Episode: "FindKaylaWeber"
2015	Being Mary Jane	Marisol Esparza	Recurring cast, season 3
2016	iZombie	Alyssa Tramall	Episode: "Fifty Shades of Grey Matter"
2016	Animal Kingdom	Catherine Belen	Main cast, season 1
2017	Lethal Weapon	Maria Navar	Episode: "A Problem Like Maria"
2017	MacGyver	Alejandra Rosa	Episode: "Duct Tape + Jack"
2018	SEAL Team	Leigh Wheeler	Episode "Containment"
2018	The Magicians	Pirate King	Episode: "The Losses of Magic"
2018	Criminal Minds	Lisa Douglas	Guest, season 13; Recurring cast, season 14
2018–2019	The Resident	Zoey Barlow	Recurring cast, season 2
2019	The Fix	Effy Collier	5 episodes
2019–2022	Dynasty	Cristal Carrington	Main cast, seasons 3–5
2025	Grosse Pointe Garden Society	Misty	Recurring cast
