= Andrew Johnston (critic) =

American film critic (1968–2008)

Andrew Johnston (1968–2008) was a film and TV critic. He wrote primarily for Time Out New York and Us Weekly and was also editor of the "Time In" section of Time Out New York.

== Biography ==
Andrew Johnston was born in Washington, D.C., and spent most of his youth in Charlottesville, Virginia, apart from the five years he was a student at the Sri Aurobindo International Centre of Education in Puducherry, India. After returning from India he graduated from Tandem Friends School in Charlottesville, Virginia, and subsequently earned a B.A in English from Earlham College in Richmond, Indiana, and a M.S.in Journalism from Columbia University. Andrew died from cancer in New York City in 2008. The film and TV critic Matt Zoller Seitz has written about Andrew's life and career in two pieces: "Deathproof: The Life in Andrew Johnston" and "Missing Andrew: Ten Years without a Good Friend".

== Career ==
Andrew Johnston began writing criticism during his college years, publishing a weekly column in The Earlham Word, and went on to write about contemporary music for Sound Views and Magnet. After earning an MS in journalism at Columbia University, Andrew began his full-time professional career as a film critic at Time Out New York and subsequently served as film critic for US Weekly and Radar, before returning to Time Out New York as TV critic and editor of the Time In section. Andrew was a member of the New York Film Critics Circle and served as its chairperson in 2003–2004. This was the year in which the award for best picture was given to The Return of the King, from The Lord of the Rings trilogy.

Andrew also wrote for other publications, including The New York Times, LA Weekly, Entertainment Weekly, The New York Post and W. He was instrumental in facilitating the careers of other writers, as well as advancing the recognition of films and TV programs whose artistry he valued.

== Critical Perspective ==
In its article on the New York Film Critics Circle Awards for 2003 MSNBC cited Andrew's perspective on The Return of the King as follows:

"It's just beautifully made, it’s pure cinema, it does everything," said Johnston, a critic for Radar. "It’s got amazing, epic scope to the drama, to the battle scenes, a lot of strong emotional stuff, really complex, well-rendered characters and effective comic relief where it needs it."

Further indications of Johnston's critical perspective can be observed in the following comment:

One of the great, if all-too-infrequent, pleasures of being a film critic is having your mind blown by a film you didn't expect much from. Such an incident occurred in December 1997, when I was assigned to review Jean Eustache's 1973 film The Mother and the Whore, then beginning a revival engagement at Film Forum. Yes, I'd heard that it was a classic of French cinema, but I wasn't exactly thrilled at catching an early-morning screening of a three-hour-and-thirty-five-minute foreign-language film that reportedly consisted of little more than people sitting around and talking. Frankly, I was a lot more excited about seeing Scream 2 that evening. Little did I know, as I eased into my seat, that I was in for one of the most memorable cinematic experiences of my life.

Johnston identified Richard Kelly's film Donnie Darko as one of the outstanding films at the Sundance Film Festival in 2001, describing it as "a heady blend of science fiction, spirituality, and teen angst."

In his list of best TV for 2005 in Time Out New York, Johnston cited Nip/Tuck, Six Feet Under, Lost, Deadwood, Veronica Mars, The Office, House, Weeds, The Shield and Battlestar Galactica, and gave honorable mention to Gilmore Girls, Rome, Medium, Rescue Me, My Name Is Earl, Project Runway, The Daily Show with Jon Stewart, Alias, Scrubs and Grey's Anatomy. Writing about Deadwood, he commented, "If history is written by the victors, Deadwood is all about giving losers their due. In the first season, magnificent bastard Al Swearingen (Ian McShane) came off as a villain; this year, his inevitably doomed campaign to save the lawless town from annexation by the United States and exploitation by robber barons served as a brilliant allegory for the evolution of American capitalism."

The Wire was Johnston's top pick for 2006. He wrote "The first three seasons of David Simon's epic meditations on urban America established The Wire as one of the best series of the decade, and with season four—centered on the heart-breaking tale of four eighth-graders whose prospects are limited by public-school bureaucracy—it officially became one for the ages." Friday Night Lights was also among Johnston's top ten. Writing about this, he noted: "Who'd have thought a tribute to heartland values would turn out to be the most avant-garde show on TV? The music and random close-ups said more than the dialog in Peter Berg's phenomenal football drama, which gave Kyle Chandler and Connie Britton the roles of a lifetime and (if there's any justice)will secure stardom for newcomers Gaius Charles and Taylor Kitsch."

For 2007, The Sopranos and Mad Men headed Johnston's list. Commenting on The Sopranos, he wrote: "Lots of TV dramas are compared to novels these days, but few others (maybe only The Wire) have achieved the scope of literary fiction while painting between the lines of small screen convention." In a debate with fellow critics Alan Sepinwall and Matt Zoller Seitz, which was published in Slant Magazine, Johnston advocated for The Sopranos as the greatest TV drama ever. On Mad Men: "Mere weeks after The Sopranos ended its run, David Chase protege Matthew Weiner offered up the next great TV drama. Drawing on the stories of John Cheever and the films of Billy Wilder for inspiration, Weiner's chronicle of the advertising world in the early 1960s instantly established itself as one of the medium's greatest studies of class in American society."

Johnston wrote analytical recaps of episodes of The Wire, Mad Men and Friday Nights Lights, which are available in the archives of Slant Magazine's blog The House Next Door.
