= Brad Leland =

American actor

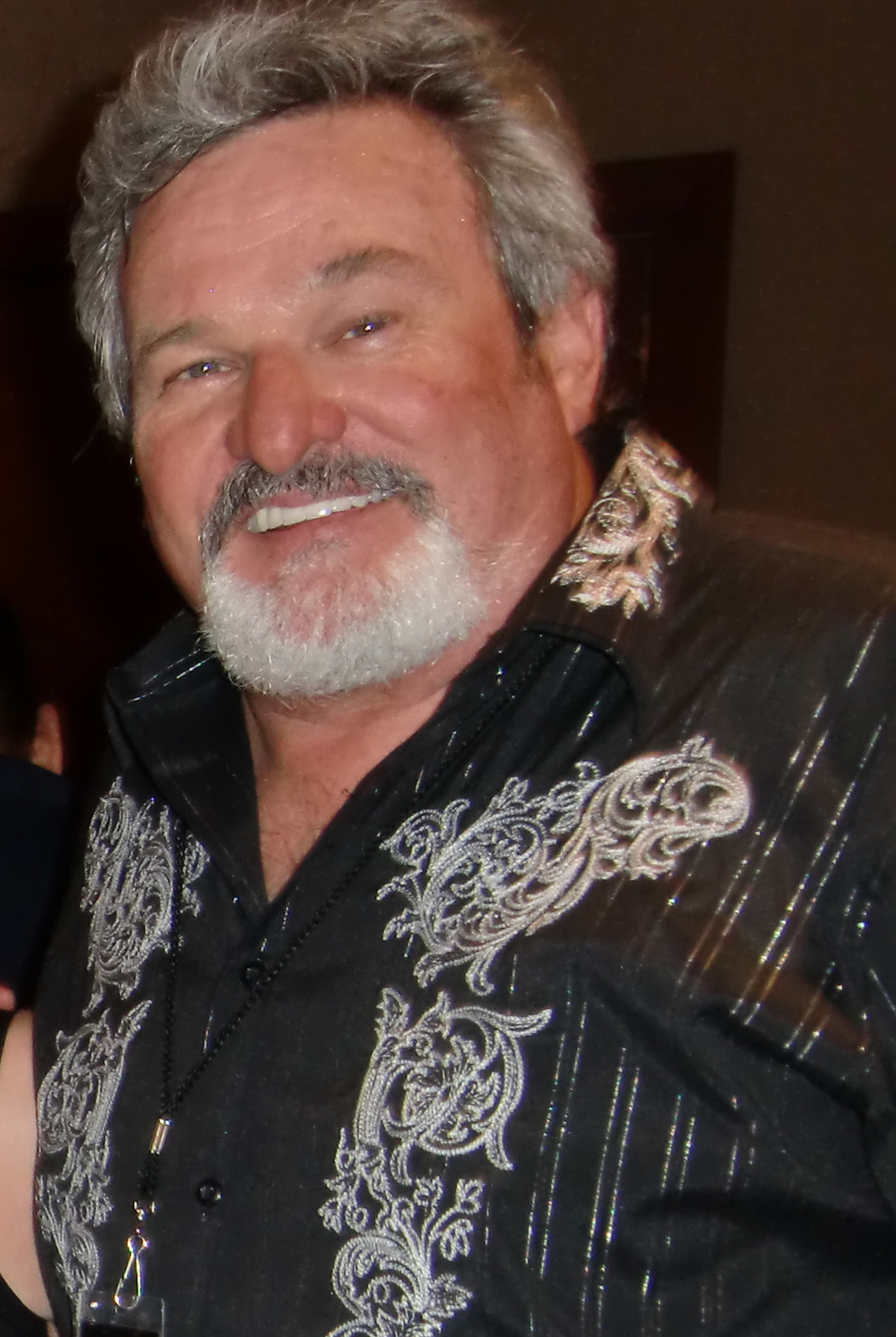
- Leland in 2011
- Born: Brad Leland; September 15, 1954 (age 72); Lubbock, Texas, U.S.
- Education: Texas Tech University (BA)
- Occupation: Actor
- Spouse: Freda Ramsey
- Children: 2

Brad Leland (born September 15, 1954) is an American film and television actor best known for his role as Buddy Garrity in the NBC/DirecTV series Friday Night Lights as well as memorable roles on critically acclaimed shows such as HBO's Veep and FX's Justified. He has appeared in over 100 feature films and television shows and numerous theater performances.

== Early life ==
Born and raised in Texas, Leland caught the showbiz bug at age 6 when he appeared onstage at Disneyland in a Wild West show. As a football player at Plano Texas High, he was part of the Plano Wildcats' 1971 state championship-winning team.

He graduated from Texas Tech University in 1980 with a bachelor's degree in acting and directing.

== Career ==
His early roles included parts on the hit TV series Dallas, in the Western film Silverado and on In the Heat of the Night. He later appeared in seven episodes of the TV series Walker, Texas Ranger, in the 2003 Texas Chain Saw Massacre remake, and as an executive in the film Hancock. One of his most visible roles was in the film Friday Night Lights, as the football booster John Aubrey. He later appeared as a similar character, Buddy Garrity, in the TV series adaptation of the film.

He has appeared on a number of popular series throughout his career, including Veep, Parks and Recreation, Last Man Standing, Justified, The Last of Us, The Leftovers, The Bureau and The Cleveland Show.

Leland played Scrooge at the Dallas Theatre Center for many seasons.

== Personal life ==
Leland is married to actress Freda Ramsey and has two daughters.

== Filmography ==
Key
†	Denotes works that have not yet been released

=== Film ===
Year	Title	Role	Notes
1985	Silverado	Trooper	
1987	Square Dance	Drunk Cowboy	
1987	Winners Take All	Scrutineer #2	
1987	Blood Rage	Teen Boy At Drive-In	
1987	Shy People	Larry	
1987	Under Cover	Terry Ray Gray	
1989	Blaze	Dufee	
1992	Ruby	Patrolman	
1994	Love and a .45	Armored Truck Driver	
1995	The Underneath	Man Delivering Money	
1996	Cadillac Ranch	Booking Deputy	
1997	The Only Thrill	Louis Quillet	
1997	Painted Hero	Deputy	
1997	The Curse of Inferno	Vince Clark	
1998	The Patriot	Bob "Big Bob"	
1999	Shadows of the Past	Barnard	
2000	The Operator	Husband	
2000	75 Degrees in July	Highway Policeman	
2001	American Outlaws	Sheriff	
2002	The Anarchist Cookbook	Truck Driver	
2003	Rolling Kansas	Dot, The Waitress	
2003	The Texas Chainsaw Massacre	Bob "Big Rig Bob"	
2004	World Without Waves	Earl	
2004	Friday Night Lights	John Aubrey	
2005	The Ringer	Mr. Henderson	
2006	Inside Man	Ronnie	
2006	The Return	Mr. Marlin	
2008	Hancock	Executive	
2008	Miracle at St. Anna	Trueheart Frazier	
2013	Möbius	CIA Agent Möbius	
2013	The Bystander Theory	Seamus Fuller	
2014	Flutter	Dr. Hughes	
2014	The Song	Mr. Harrison	
2014	The One I Wrote for You	Mr. Harrison	
2016	Deepwater Horizon	Kaluza	
2018	The Domestics	Pit Boss Gambler	
2019	The Great Alaskan Race	Mayor Maynard	
2019	The Last Whistle	Victor Trenton	
2021	Land	Colt	
2022	Hostile Territory	Frank Smith	
2023	LaRoy, Texas	Adam Ledoux	
2023	Accidental Texan	Max Dugan	
2025	Bad Men Must Bleed	Leon	
2025	The Long Shot	Councilman Hager	
2026	The Gates	Christopher	

=== Television ===
Year	Title	Role	Notes
1986	Dalton: Code of Vengeance II	Deputy Hackett	Television film
1986	Dallas	Man In Bar 1	Episode: "Trompe L'Oeil"
1986	Houston: The Legend of Texas	Sergeant Quinn	Television film
1987	CBS Summer Playhouse	Travis	Episode: "Travelin' Man"
1988	Longarm	Range	Television film
1988	In the Heat of the Night	Mason "Mace" Trapnell	Episode: "Fate"
1989	The Young Riders	Dill	Episode: "Ten-Cent Hero"
1991	Perry Mason: The Case of the Ruthless Reporter	Fire Captain	Television film
1991	A Seduction in Travis County	Officer Grissom	Television film
1991	Stranger at My Door	Alan Fletcher	Television film
1992	Trial: The Price of Passion	Officer Manley	Television film
1992	An American Story	Andy Buckley	Television film
1992	Revenge on the Highway	Jimmy Fortune	Television film
1992	Unnatural Pursuits	Valet	Episode: "I Don't Do Cuddles"
1993	Dangerous Curves	Frank Banner	Episode: "The French Defection"
1993	Fatal Deception: Mrs. Lee Harvey Oswald	First Cop	Television film
1994	Witness to the Execution	Police Officer	Television film
1994	North & South: Book 3, Heaven & Hell	Beaufort	3 episodes
1994–1998	Walker, Texas Ranger	Joey Dunbar / Carl Wade / Luke	7 episodes
1995	Texas Justice	Stan Farr	Television film
1998	Dallas: War of the Ewings	Deputy Sheriff	Television film
1998	Still Holding On: The Legend of Cadillac Jack	"Tubby"	Television film
2006–2011	Friday Night Lights	Buddy Garrity	Recurring role; 73 episodes
2007	Walking Tall: The Payback	Mitch	Video
2009–2010	CSI: Miami	John "Sully" Sullivan	4 episodes
2010	The Cleveland Show	Slim Biggins (voice)	Episode: "Cleveland's Angels"
2012	Parks and Recreation	Fester Trim	Episode: "The Debate"
2012–2016	Veep	Senator Bill O'Brien	6 episodes
2013	The Sixth Gun	Constantine	Television film
2014	Killer Women	Wily Whitman	Episode: "La Sicaria"
2014	The Leftovers	Congressman Witten	Episode: "Pilot"
2014	Camp Abercorn: Shorts	Russell	Television miniseries
2014	Damaged Goods	Ed	Television film
2015	Justified	Calhoun Schreier	3 episodes
2015–2016	The Bureau	Peter Cassidy	12 episodes
2016	Camp Abercorn	Tom Russell	Episode: "Pilot"
2017	Last Man Standing	Wayne	Episode: "The Friending Library"
2017	Angie Tribeca	Arnold Waifer	Episode: "Brockman Turner Overdrive"
2021	Alisters (TV Series)		Episode: Interview with Brad Leland
2023	The Last of Us	Danny Adler	Episode: "When You're Lost in the Darkness"
2023	Love & Death	Chief Royce Abbott	3 episodes

=== Video games ===
Year	Title	Role	Notes
2016	Mafia III	Lou "Uncle Lou" Marcano	Voice and motion capture role.
