= Gaius Charles =

American actor (born 1983)

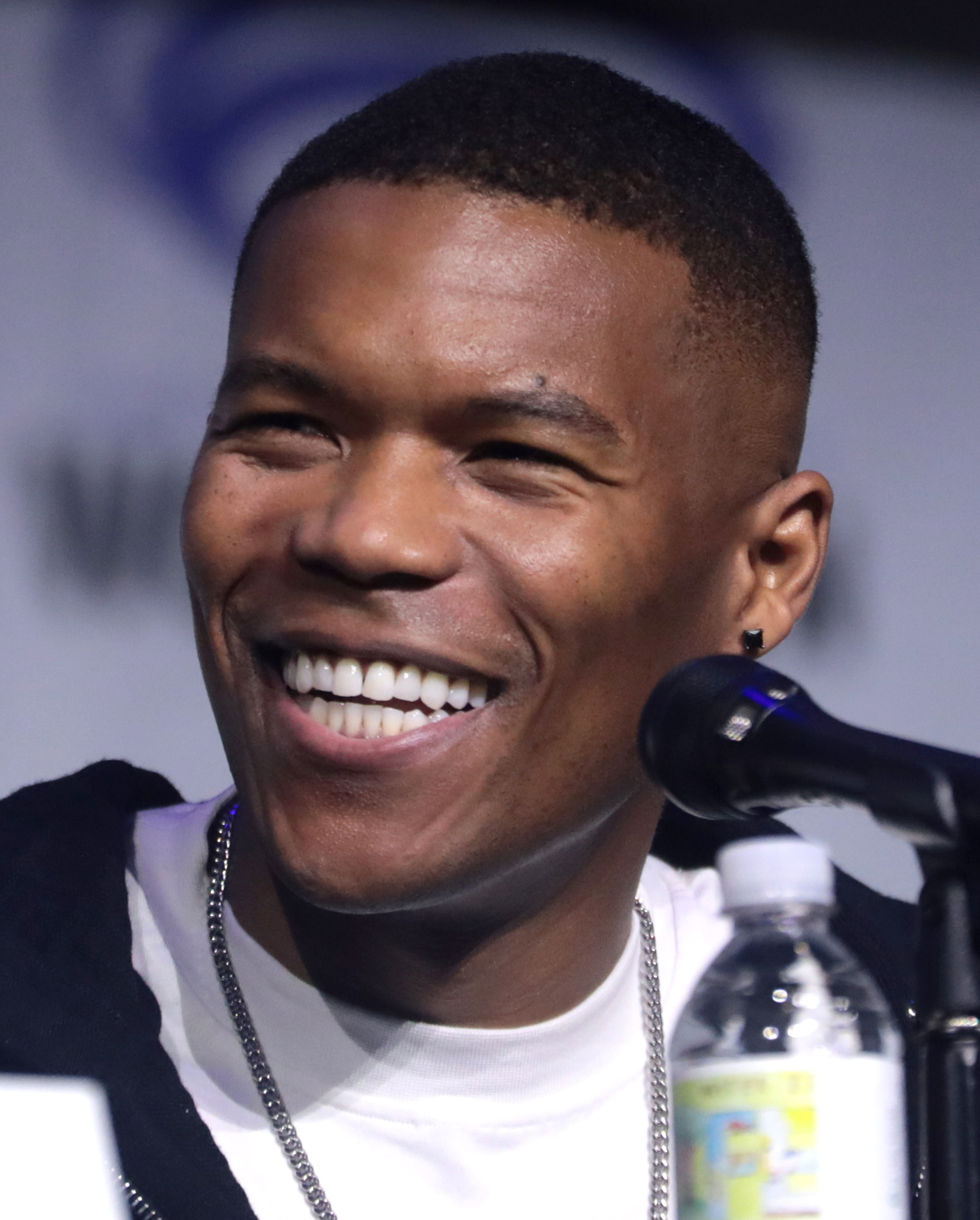
- Charles at the 2023 WonderCon
- Born: May 2, 1983 (age 43); Manhattan, New York, U.S.
- Education: Carnegie Mellon University (BFA); Drew University (MA)
- Occupation: Actor
- Years active: 2006–present

Gaius Charles (born May 2, 1983) is an American actor known for his portrayal of Brian "Smash" Williams in the television drama, Friday Night Lights. He also played Dr. Shane Ross on the ABC medical drama series Grey's Anatomy and a recurring role on the NBC historical-drama series Aquarius, as Black Panther leader Bunchy Carter. He also played a role on NCIS's ninth season as Jason King, an arson investigator for the Baltimore Police Department.

== Early life ==
Charles was born on May 2, 1983, in Manhattan, New York. He was raised in New York City and Teaneck, New Jersey.

During his childhood, Charles attended Benjamin Franklin Middle School in Teaneck, where he delivered the school announcements as a sixth-grade student. In seventh grade, he took his first acting class. He graduated from Teaneck High School in 2001. While in high school, he took theater classes and participated in youth programs at the Bergen Performing Arts Center in Englewood.

After graduating from high school, Charles pursued his passion for acting at Carnegie Mellon University's College of Fine Arts, earning a Bachelor of Fine Arts degree in drama. During his senior year, he spent one semester studying at the National Institute of Dramatic Art (NIDA) in Sydney, Australia.

Charles grew up as a Christian and regularly attended both Tenafly United Methodist Church and Community Baptist Church in Englewood.

== Career ==
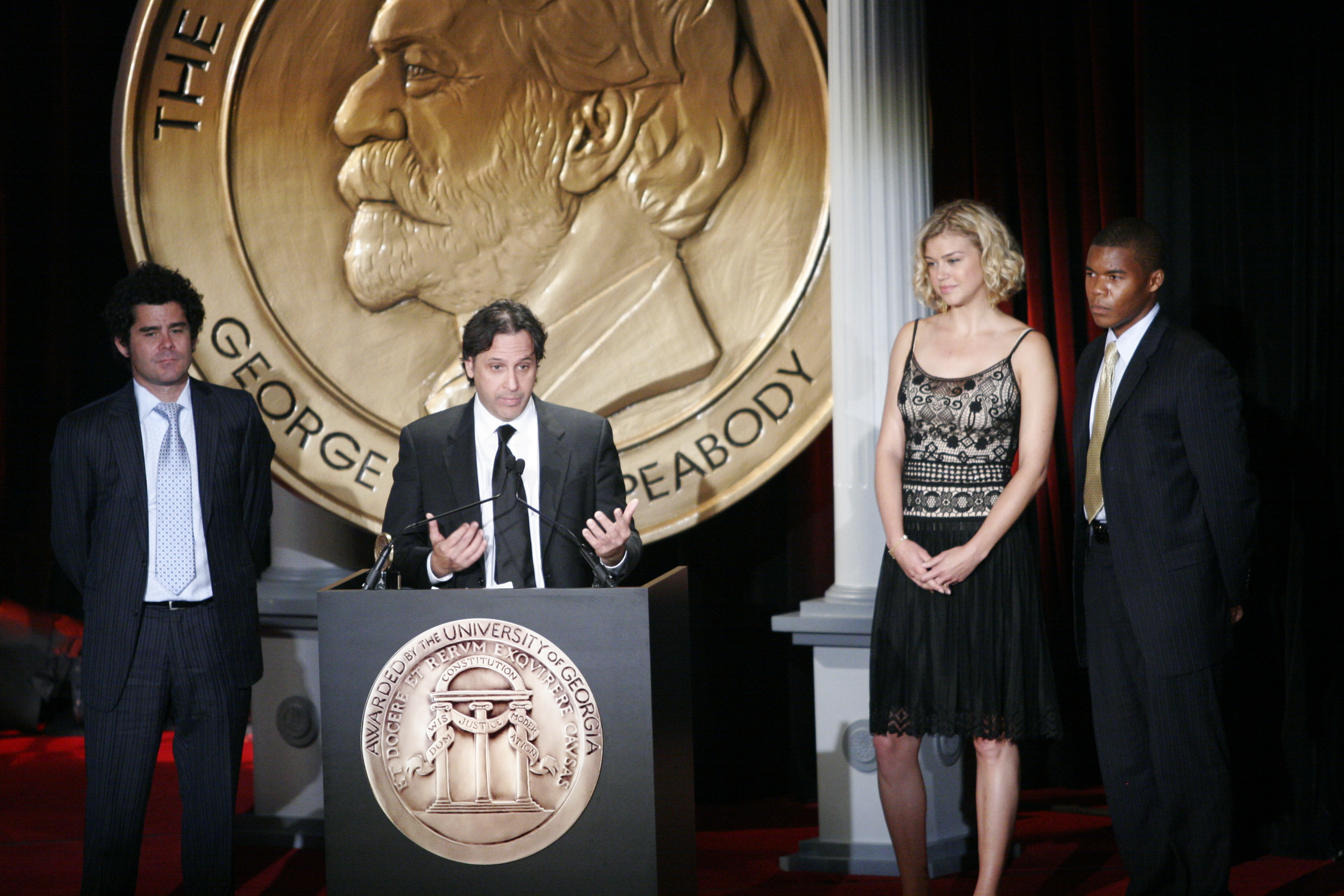
Jeffrey Reiner, Jason Katims, Adrianne Palicki and Gaius Charles accept the Peabody Award for Friday Night Lights, June 2007

In 2006, Charles landed the role of Smash Williams in Friday Night Lights, a character he portrayed for three seasons. He then took a break from acting to pursue a Master of Arts degree in Religious Studies from Drew University. During his studies, he traveled to India to study the world's religions and to Uganda, where he preached at a local church and later raised funds to support a youth conference focused on HIV/AIDS awareness.

After completing his theological studies, Charles returned to acting and joined the cast of Grey's Anatomy as medical intern Shane Ross.

In 2017, Charles starred in the first season of NBC's television drama series Taken, based on the Taken film franchise. He has appeared in other television series such as Aquarius, in which he portrayed Civil Rights Activist and Black Panther Bunchy Carter, and Necessary Roughness.

Charles made guest appearances on Agents of S.H.I.E.L.D., Blindspot, Comedy Central's Drunk History, in which he portrayed Muhammad Ali, NCIS, Pan Am, and Law & Order: SVU. His film credits include the independent features The Stanford Prison Experiment, Toe To Toe, and The Messenger. He's also worked on studio films like Salt and Takers. In addition to film and television, Charles starred in the Labyrinth Theater Company's production of Othello alongside Philip Seymour Hoffman and John Ortiz. He received positive reviews for originating the roles of “EZ” in Beau Willimon's play Lower Ninth and “Malcolm” in director Thomas Kail's Broke-ology.

== Filmography ==
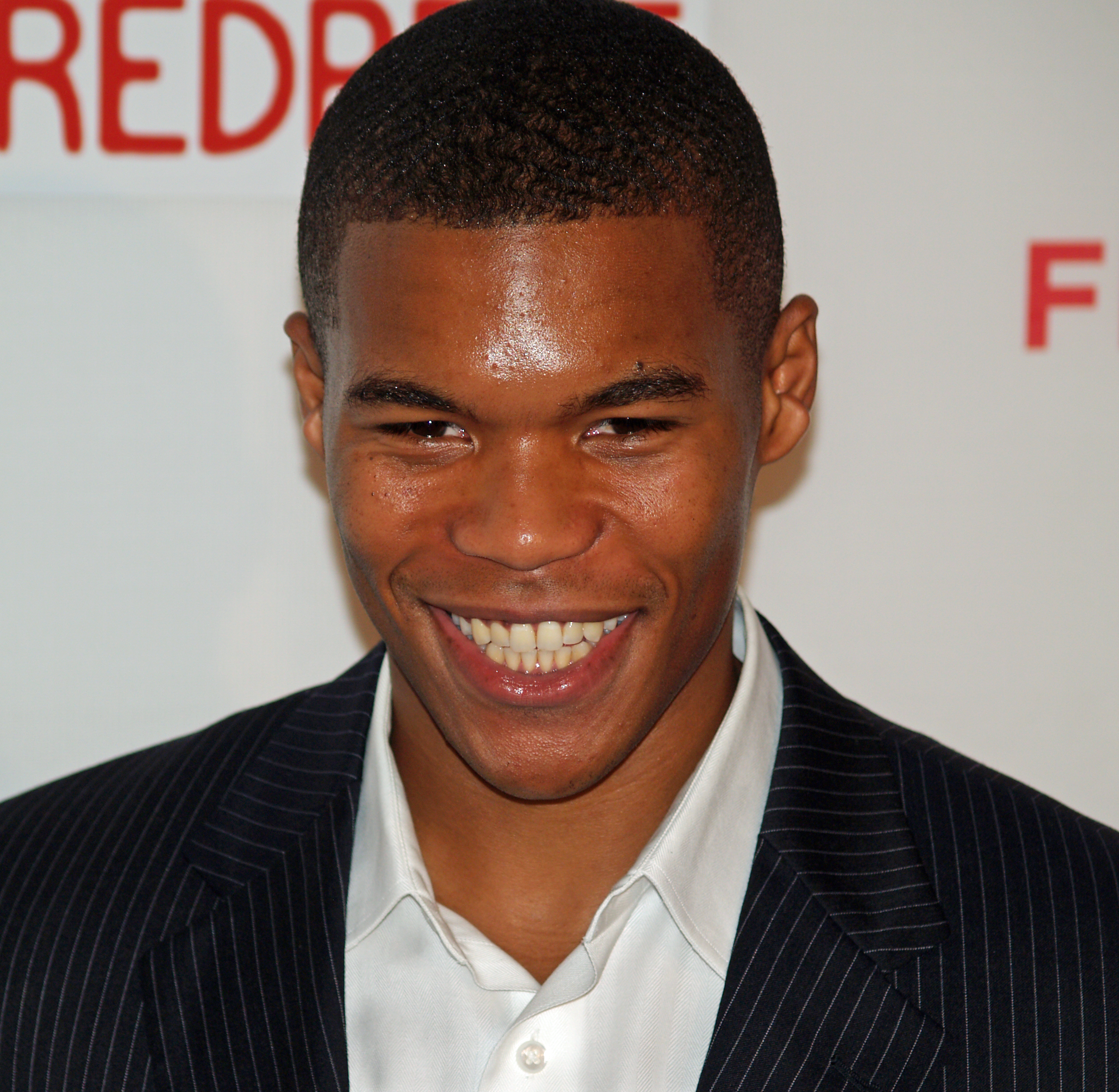
Charles at the premiere of Redbelt at Tribeca Film Festival in 2008

=== Film ===
Year	Title	Role	Notes
2009	Toe to Toe	Kevin	
2009	The Messenger	Recruiter Brown	
2010	Salt	CIA Officer	
2010	Takers	Max	
2015	The Stanford Prison Experiment	Paul Vogel	
2016	Batman: Bad Blood	Luke Fox/Batwing (voice)	Video
2021	Land of Dreams	David	
2022	Alice	Joseph	

=== Television ===
Year	Title	Role	Notes
2006	The Book of Daniel	Carver	Episode: "Betrayal"
2006–08	Friday Night Lights	Brian "Smash" Williams	Main cast: Season 1–2, recurring cast: Season 3
2007	Law & Order: Special Victims Unit	Jadon Odami	Episode: "Fight"
2011	Pan Am	Joe	Episode: "Truth or Dare"
2012	NCIS	Baltimore Detective Jason King	Episode: "Rekindled"
2012	Necessary Roughness	Damon Razor	Recurring cast: season 2
2012–14	Grey's Anatomy	Dr. Shane Ross	Recurring cast: Season 9, main cast: Season 10
2015	Six Guys One Car	Larry	Recurring cast: season 2
2015	Drunk History	Muhammad Ali	Episode: "Cleveland"
2016	Blindspot	Sgt. Charlie Napier	Episode: "Scientists Hollow Fortune"
2016	Agents of S.H.I.E.L.D.	Ruben Mackenzie	Episode: "Watchdogs"
2015–16	Aquarius	Bunchy Carter	Recurring cast
2017	Taken	John	Main cast: season 1
2019	Drunk History	Moses Fleetwood Walker	Episode: "Baseball"
2019–20	God Friended Me	Rev. Andrew Carver	Main cast: season 1, recurring cast: season 2
2020–22	Roswell, New Mexico	Roy Bronson	Recurring cast: season 2, guest: seasons 3–4
2022	Queens	Tomas	Recurring cast
2022	The Wonder Years	Mr. Brady	Episode: "Black Teacher"
2023–2026	The Walking Dead: Dead City	Perlie Armstrong	Main cast; 14 episodes
