= Bad Ideas =

Bad Ideas may refer to:

- Bad Ideas (album), a 2019 album by Tessa Violet
- Bad Ideas (Friday Night Lights), an episode of the TV series Friday Night Lights
- "Bad Ideas", a 2016 song by Alle Farben
- "Bad Ideas", a 2018 song by Tessa Violet
- Bad Ideas Festival, a student event at MIT

== See also ==
- Bad Idea (disambiguation)
