= Moderation (disambiguation) =

Moderation is the process of eliminating or lessening extremes.

Moderation can also refer to:

- Moderation (statistics), when the relationship between two variables depends on a third variable
- Content moderation, the practice of managing discussion on an online forum
- Moderation (game), the practice of refereeing multiplayer role-playing games
- Moderation (novel), a 2025 book by Elaine Castillo
- "Moderation" (song), by Florence and the Machine
- "Moderation", a song by Cate Le Bon from Pompeii
- Moderation (album), an album by Daysormay
- The role of a neutron moderator in a nuclear reactor

== See also ==
- Moderate, a middle position in a left/right political system
