= With Love (Christina Grimmie album) =

- Standard edition

Studio album by Christina Grimmie
- Released: August 6, 2013
- Genre: Pop
- Length: 38:05
- Label: Independent (CD Sales); Maker Music (Internet Sales)

Christina Grimmie chronology
Find Me (2011)	With Love (2013)	Side A (2016)

Singles from With Love
- 1. "Tell My Mama" Released: August 4, 2013; 2. "Feelin' Good" Released: April 11, 2014

With Love is the debut studio album by American singer Christina Grimmie, coming two years after her debut EP Find Me (2011). The album was released on August 6, 2013, first announced through her YouTube channel. To support the album, Grimmie toured as one of the opening acts on Selena Gomez's Stars Dance Tour on US and Canadian dates. While the album was made independently, Maker Music handled the internet sales worldwide.

After With Love, Grimmie recorded many more song ideas in the studio. She released the EP Side A in early 2016, but she died four months later. The leftover studio work was completed to create the posthumous releases Side B and All Is Vanity in 2017.

== Singles ==
"Tell My Mama" served as the album's lead single, sent for airplay exclusively to Radio Disney on August 4, 2013. On August 8, Grimmie performed the song for Seventeen magazine. The music video of the song premiered exclusively on Billboard. It was directed by David Turvey. Grimmie says the song is "about a guy that I start liking in school, and he's sort of a dangerous kid, and I am the type of girl that tells my mom about everything". She sang the song in On Air with Ryan Seacrest with "Think of You" and "Over Overthinking You".

"Feelin' Good" was the album's second single. The music video for the song was released on April 11, 2014, and features footage from fans.

== Critical reception ==
Critic of Music's review was positive, giving the album a B−, and saying that, "overall, a massive improvement from Find Me, but there is still work to be done."

== Track listing ==
No.	Title	Writer(s)	Producer(s)	Length
1.	"Over Overthinking You"	Christina Grimmie; Brennan Aerts; Khara Lord		3:03
2.	"Absolutely Final Goodbye"	Toby Gad; Lindy Robbins; Stooshie		2:40
3.	"Make It Work"	C. Todd Nielsen; Grace Mitchell		3:50
4.	"Get Yourself Together"	MoZella; Rune Westberg; Haley Reinhart		3:32
5.	"With Love"	Grimmie; Neilsen	Christina Grimmie	3:57
6.	"Tell My Mama"	Andrew Bolooki; Lunchmoney Lewis; Jacob Kasher; E. Kidd Bogart	Andrew Bolooki	3:19
7.	"Feelin' Good"	Grimmie; Neilsen; Jonathan Radford Mead		4:03
8.	"The One I Crave"	Gad; Pixie Lott		2:51
9.	"I Bet You Don't Curse God"	Grimmie; Philip Bentley; Jeff Sierota		3:51
10.	"Think of You"	Grimmie; Andy Davis		3:45
11.	"My Anthem" (bonus track)	Grimmie; Gad		3:14
Total length:				38:05

== Chart performance ==
Chart (2013)	Peak position
Belgian Albums (Ultratop Flanders)	167
US Independent Albums (Billboard)	20
US Billboard 200	101

== Release history ==
Country	Release date	Format	Label	Ref
United States	August 6, 2013	CD; Digital download	Independent; Maker Music	
