= Everybody Lies =

Everybody Lies may refer to:

- Everybody Lies (book), a 2017 book by Seth Stephens-Davidowitz
- "Everybody Lies" (song), a 2017 song by Christina Grimmie from All Is Vanity
- "Everybody Lies" (Emerald City), a 2017 television episode
- "Everybody Lies" (House), a 2004 television episode, also called "Pilot"
