= My Buddy (song) =

1922 composition by Walter Donaldson

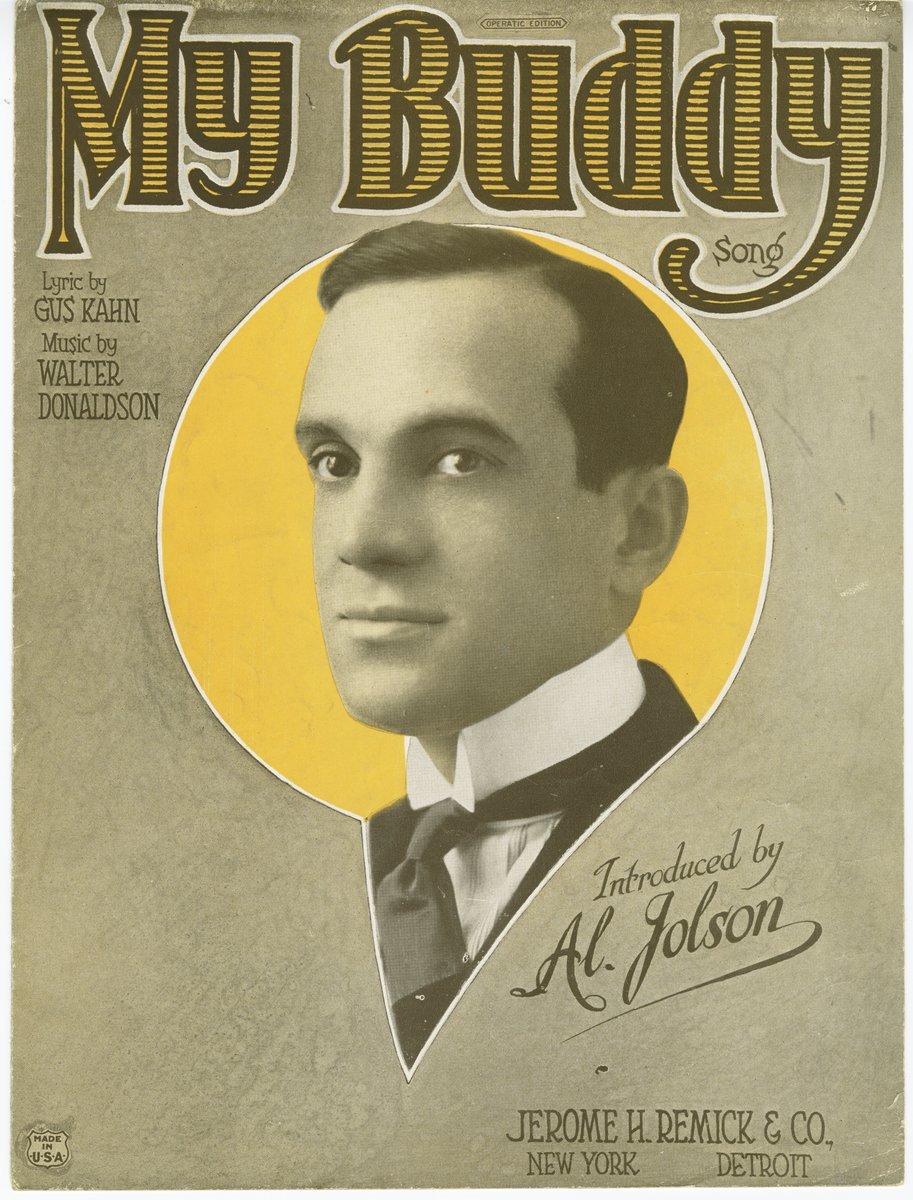
1922 sheet music cover with image of singer Al Jolson

"My Buddy" is a popular song with music written by Walter Donaldson, and lyrics by Gus Kahn. The song was published in 1922 and early popular versions were by Henry Burr (1922), Ernest Hare (1923) and Ben Bernie (also 1923).

My Buddy
A 1922 recording featuring Henry Burr

== Other recorded versions ==
- Alvino Rey
- Gene Autry
- Chet Baker (1953)
- Count Basie (1947)
- Teresa Brewer – included in her album Music, Music, Music (1955).
- Benny Carter
- Rosemary Clooney – included in her 1983 album My Buddy.
- Harry Connick Sr.
- Bing Crosby – recorded December 30, 1940 with Victor Young and his Orchestra.
- Johnny Dankworth – Too Cool For The Blues (2010)
- Bobby Darin - Oh! Look at Me Now (1962).
- Doris Day – included in the album I'll See You in My Dreams (1951).
- Judith Durham
- Connie Francis (1963)
- Jimmy Forrest (1951)
- Stan Getz
- Jackie Gleason
- Eydie Gormé – included in her album Eydie Gormé – Vamps The Roaring 20's (1958).
- Doctor John (1989)
- Al Jolson
- Ray Charles
- Jerry Gray (1945)
- Lionel Hampton
- Coleman Hawkins
- Earl Hines (1974)
- Harry James and his Orchestra (vocal: Frank Sinatra) (recorded August 17, 1939)
- Miyuki Koga
- Mario Lanza
- Lena Horne
- Sammy Kaye – with a vocal by Tommy Ryan, reached the Billboard charts briefly in 1942.
- Guy Lombardo
- Glenn Miller
- The Mills Brothers – for their album Mmmm ... The Mills Brothers (1958)
- Jaye P. Morgan
- Anne Murray – 2004 on I'll Be Seeing You (Anne Murray album)
- Jimmy Nail
- Tony O'Malley
- Dinah Shore (1949)
- Nancy Sinatra (1966)
- Kate Smith
- Kay Starr
- Sonny Stitt
- Barbra Streisand – on her 1974 album The Way We Were.
- Mel Tormé (1949)
- Billy Vaughn
- Jerry Jeff Walker – A Man Must Carry On (1977)
- Barry White
- Bob Wills
- Glenn Frey The lyrics are different than the original by Gus Kahn
- Jeff Healey
- Christina Grimmie for the movie The Matchbreaker (2016)

== Film appearances ==
- 1925 The Big Parade
- 1927 Wings
- 1951 I'll See You in My Dreams – sung by Doris Day
- 1970 It was sung by the prisoners in the How's The Weather episode of the TV show "Hogan's Heroes".
- 1980 The Black Marble
- "Blue Bell Boy", the 4th episode (aired 2012) of the third season of HBO's crime drama Boardwalk Empire; ends with Al Capone singing the song to his deaf son, Sonny.
- "Come On and Marry Me Bill", the 18th episode of the third season of Designing Women - Dixie Carter's Julia Sugarbaker sings the song to Jean Smart's Charlene Frazier, at Charlene's bachelorette party.
