= Maybe I =

Maybe I may refer to:

- "Maybe I", a song by Christina Grimmie from the 2017 album All Is Vanity
- "Maybe I", a song by Five for Fighting from the 2003 album The Battle for Everything
