= Crowded Room =

Crowded Room may refer to:

- "Crowded Room" (Christina Grimmie song), 2017
- "Crowded Room" (Selena Gomez song), 2020
- "Crowded Room" (The Academy Is... song), 2008
- "Crowded Room", a song by XTC from Go 2, 1978
- "The Crowded Room", television miniseries, 2023
