= Halloway (EP) =

EP by Tessa Violet
- Released: September 16, 2016
- Genre: Dark pop
- Length: 16:52
- Label: Self-released
- Producer: Seth Earnest

Tessa Violet chronology
Maybe Trapped Mostly Troubled (2014)	Halloway (2016)	Bad Ideas (2019)

Halloway is the first EP by American singer-songwriter Tessa Violet. It was self-released on September 16, 2016, on CD and made available to download digitally. The title of Halloway was inspired by the character Will Halloway from the 1962 novel Something Wicked This Way Comes by Ray Bradbury. Violet listened to audiobook version while on tour after her mom said it was "one of the scariest books she’s read, and one of the most well-written." Violet described the album as "dark pop". The album was produced by frequent Tessa Violet collaborator Seth Earnest.

== Production ==
During Halloway's production, Violet listened to Taylor Swift's 1989, Troye Sivan's Blue Neighbourhood, and Halsey's Badlands; as well as pop playlists on Spotify.

== Alternate versions ==
Violet released a royalty-free B sides version through her second reward tier of her Patreon.

== Track listing ==
No.	Title	Length
1.	"Dream"	3:26
2.	"Not over You"	3:13
3.	"Haze"	3:46
4.	"On My Own"	2:56
5.	"I Don't Get to Say I Love You Anymore"	3:30
Total length:		16:52
