= Aubrey Babas =

Ukrainian-American director

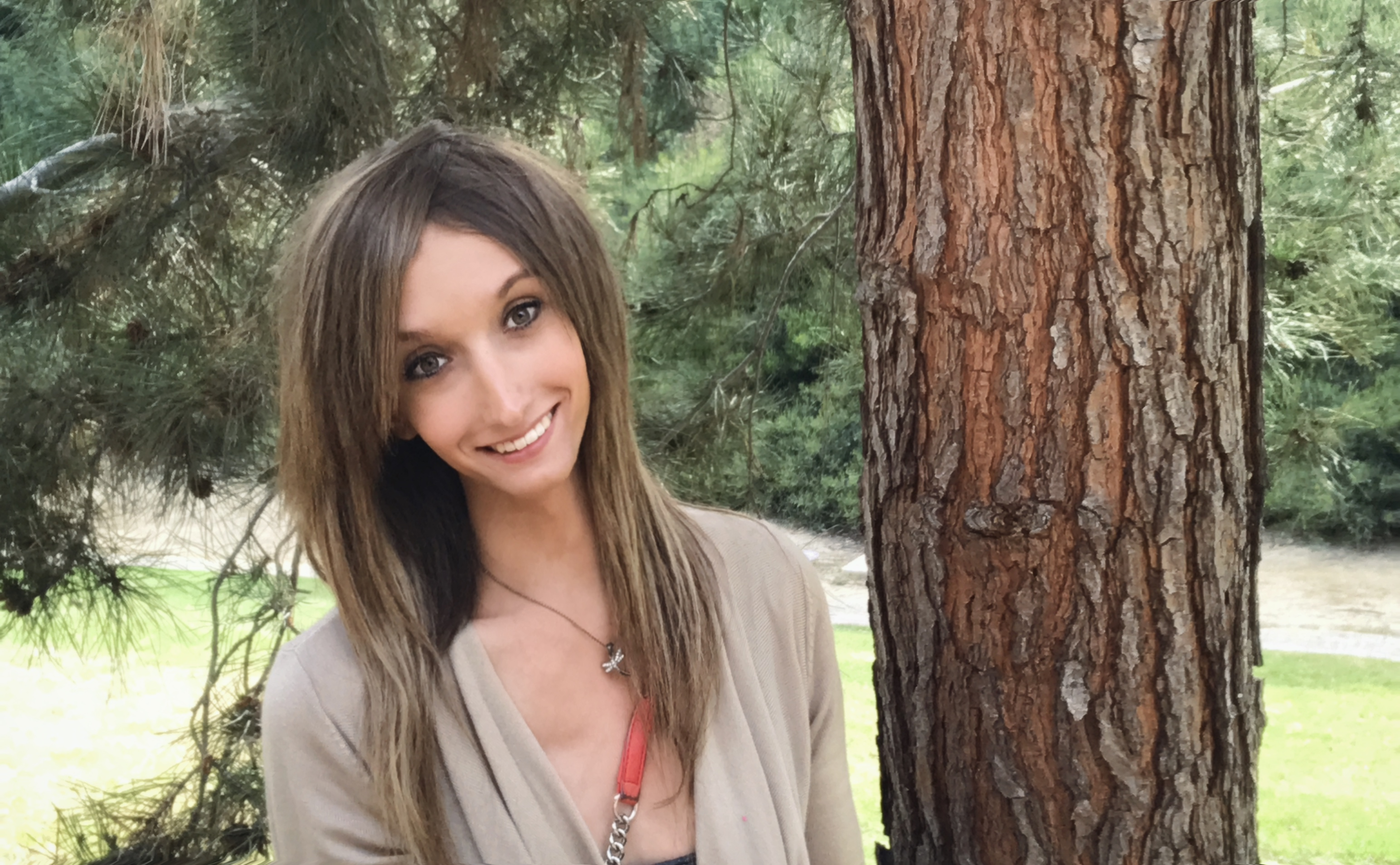
- Born: February 6, 1992 (age 34)
- Occupations: Writer & Film Director, Cinematographer
- Years active: 2007-present
- Website: www.lumivisionentertainment.com

Aubrey Babas is a commercial, music video, and motion picture film director.

== Biography ==
Aubrey Babas is a Ukrainian immigrant, American film producer and writer. She was born on February 6, 1992, to Ukrainian parents and was adopted out of Moscow, Russia, from an orphanage at the age of two. She was raised in the suburbs of Troy, Michigan, by her adoptive parents, Maureen and Robert Babas. Maureen Babas, a licensed pilot, R.N. and attorney, died after a three-year battle with cancer when Aubrey was only nine years old. Her father, Robert Babas, retired as a lieutenant colonel after receiving the Purple Heart, and worked for Unisys Corp. for nearly four decades.

By the time Babas graduated high school, her work had already aired on network television and screened at national film festivals. After attending Columbia University for one semester, she moved to California to continue her work as a film director.

Babas worked with record labels and recording artists including Young Money (YMCMB), Twista, Christina Grimmie, Big Sean, Yung Joc, Royce Da 5'9, Dallas Lovato, and more. The transgender Ukrainian immigrant established herself as a national music video and commercial director, having also done spots for Monster Energy, Doritos and Chevrolet's Camaro.

In 2011, Babas worked with Brian Teefey, stepfather of Selena Gomez, to direct Christina Grimmie's debut music video for "Advice" under his company, LH7 Management.

== Present day ==
In 2022, Babas returned to the film industry and opened up her own video production company, LumiVision Entertainment.

== Awards ==
- Directed 2 of the top 18 music videos of 2011 named by TuneLab
- Westfall "Industrial Rodent"
- Otto Vector "Charlie Mix"
- Directed 1 of 5 music videos screened at the 2010 Florida Music Festival
- Directed #1 music video on MTV - KDrew - "One"
