= Side A (EP) =

EP by Christina Grimmie
- Released: February 21, 2016
- Genre: Pop; teen pop
- Length: 14:34
- Label: Independent; LH7 Management
- Producer: Christina Grimmie

Christina Grimmie chronology
With Love (2013)	Side A (2016)	Side B (2017)

Side A is the second EP by American artist Christina Grimmie released for digital download on February 21, 2016. The EP was produced by Maker Music and AwesomenessTV. Physical copies of the EP were sold at Grimmie's tour appearances and shows. The EP was released independently and debuted at number 25 on the Billboard Independent Albums chart in the US. This marked her final release prior to her death on June 10, 2016.

Four posthumous music videos were released two months after her death. All of them have been directed by King Hollis, while co-produced by AwesomenessTV and Media 13. The music videos also pay tribute to Christina herself. Furthermore, these are her only music videos not to have been co-produced by Maker Studios, after she was dropped due to still unknown reasons.

Before her death, Christina had already revealed plans to release a third EP, named Side B, which would serve as the successor to the Side A EP. It was released posthumously on April 21, 2017.

== Track listing ==
No.	Title	Writer(s)	Producer(s)	Length
1.	"Snow White"	Christina Grimmie	Christina Grimmie	3:40
2.	"Anybody's You"	Grimmie; Nathaniel Lamm Evans; Mark Merthe; Gustav Johan Lindbrandt	Grimmie	3:42
3.	"Deception"	Grimmie	Grimmie	3:17
4.	"Without Him"	Grimmie	Grimmie	3:55
Total length:				14:34

== Charts ==
Chart (2016)	Peak position
New Zealand Heatseekers Albums (RMNZ)	10
US Independent Albums (Billboard)	11
US Billboard 200	171

== Release history ==
Region	Date	Format	Label
United States	February 21, 2016	CD; Digital download	Independent; LH7 Management
