= Last Days of Summer (Friday Night Lights) =

- Friday Night Lights episode
- Episode no.: Season 2 Episode 1
- Directed by: Jeffrey Reiner
- Written by: Jason Katims
- Cinematography by: David Boyd
- Editing by: Peter B. Ellis
- Original release date: October 5, 2007
- Running time: 43 minutes

Guest appearances
- Chris Mulkey as Coach Bill McGregor; Brad Leland as Buddy Garrity; Glenn Morshower as Chad Clarke; Taylor Nichols as Kevin

Episode chronology
← Previous "State"	Next → "Bad Ideas"
- Friday Night Lights (season 2)

"Last Days of Summer" is the first episode of the second season of the American sports drama television series Friday Night Lights, inspired by the 1990 nonfiction book by H. G. Bissinger. It is the 23rd overall episode of the series and was written by executive producer Jason Katims and directed by executive producer Jeffrey Reiner. It originally aired on NBC on October 5, 2007, but the episode was released to stream on Yahoo! on September 19, 2007.

The series is set in the fictional town of Dillon, a small, close-knit community in rural West Texas. It follows a high school football team, the Dillon Panthers. It features a set of characters, primarily connected to Coach Eric Taylor, his wife Tami, and their daughter Julie. In the episode, Eric returns for the birth of his child, and finds that things have changed in his absence. Meanwhile, Lyla struggles with her mother's new boyfriend, while Landry continues hanging out with Tyra.

According to Nielsen Media Research, the episode was seen by an estimated 6.37 million household viewers and gained a 2.2 ratings share among adults aged 18–49. The episode received positive reviews from critics, who praised the performances and new storylines. However, the subplot with Landry and Tyra was widely panned by critics and audiences, feeling that it was out of character and inadequate for the series.

== Plot ==
During summer season, Julie (Aimee Teegarden) has taken a job as a lifeguard at a public pool. She constantly flirts with her fellow lifeguard, which makes Matt (Zach Gilford) jealous. During a visit, Tami (Connie Britton) finds that her water has broken three weeks early. Eric (Kyle Chandler) arrives to the hospital in time to be with Tami, just as their new child, Gracie Bell, is born.

The Panthers have a new coach, Bill McGregor (Chris Mulkey), who employs a strict and aggressive approach to his tactics. He is not interested in using Matt (Zach Gilford) at his potential, and constantly punishes Tim (Taylor Kitsch) for disrespecting him. Lyla (Minka Kelly) has become part of a Christian youth group and is baptized in a river. Her mother is now dating a man named Kevin (Taylor Nichols), of whom Lyla disapproves. Buddy (Brad Leland) is also annoyed by Kevin's presence, and almost attacks him when he arrives at the dealership.

Eric starts to feel left out of his own life, as he is not aware of Julie's life. To complicate matters, TMU is asking for his return in a few days, which upsets Tami as she needed his help with Gracie Bell. Julie is also growing distant from Matt, and decides to go out with her friend to a bar to impress her lifeguard partner. However, she is disappointed when she finds he has a girlfriend and calls Eric to pick her up. Eric scolds her for being at a bar, to which Julie finally expresses that she feels lost. She admits that she has flirted with the lifeguard, as she feels Matt is becoming more like Eric and that she is becoming more like Tami. Eric consoles her. Later, Eric presents the Panthers with rings before leaving for Austin.

Landry (Jesse Plemons) and Tyra (Adrianne Palicki) have become friends, with Landry planning to form part of the football team to impress her and his family. At the parking lot, Tyra is almost hit by a car, believing that it might be the man who tried to rape her. (Note: As depicted in "Mud Bowl".) While watching Fried Green Tomatoes, they decide to go to a grocery store to buy snacks. As Landry goes inside, the man approaches Tyra at the parking lot. He tries to force himself onto her, until Landry arrives and pushes him aside. The man starts walking away, claiming he will return. Landry then picks up a nearby pipe and brutally hits the man in the head twice, knocking him unconscious. As they take him to the hospital, they panic when they realize the man has died. Tyra refuses to get Landry's father, a cop, involved, and they dump the body down a river.

== Production ==
=== Development ===
In September 2007, NBC announced that the first episode of the season would be titled "Last Days of Summer". The episode was written by executive producer Jason Katims and directed by executive producer Jeffrey Reiner. This was Katims' fifth writing credit, and Reiner's ninth directing credit.

=== Writing ===
What we want to do is not turning into a murder mystery or CSI, but it's basically these two teenagers in a position where it leads to this incredibly intimate storyline between these two characters that would never - their relationship would never become as intimate as it does if not for this event. It really becomes this story, like all Friday Night Lights stories, about character, about two people trying to deal with it, what they've done, all the guilt and everything would happen to them, and that the two of them get more connected than they ever would have.

— Showrunner, Jason Katims.

A vital point of the episode, and the season overall, was a subplot where Landry kills Tyra's stalker and then they both dump the body in a river. Jason Katims denied that the network had a role in the storyline, claiming that the writers were actually working on the subplot since the first season. Katims also said that while the writers loved the character of Landry as a comic relief, they wanted to expand more on the character, including introducing his off-screen family.

Katims said that viewers would change their minds with the follow-up episode, explaining "I think that once they see the next episode and the episode after that, they'll see that it's a really compelling storyline that is about character, it's not changing the show or trying to take the show into a murder mystery. The show very much stays tonally in keeping with everything the show has been before."

== Reception ==
=== Viewers ===
In its original American broadcast, "Last Days of Summer" was seen by an estimated 6.37 million household viewers with a 2.2 in the 18–49 demographics. This means that 2.2 percent of all households with televisions watched the episode. It finished 68th out of 102 programs airing from October 1–7, 2007. This was a slight increase in viewership from the previous episode, which was watched by an estimated 6.26 million household viewers with a 2.2 in the 18–49 demographics.

=== Critical reviews ===
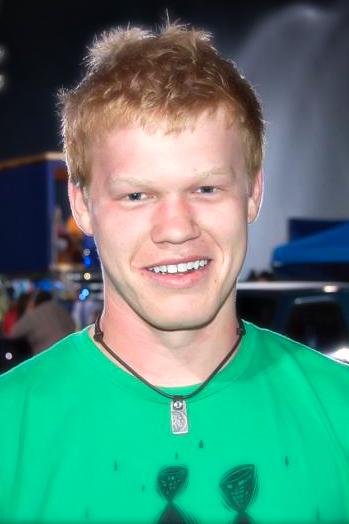
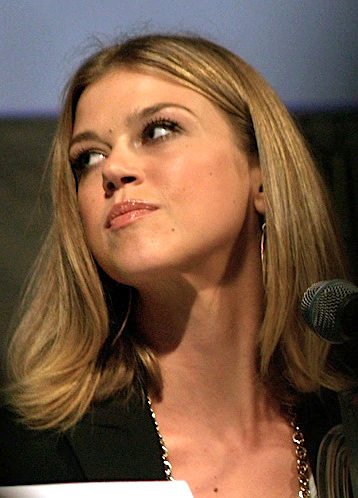
While the episode received positive reviews, the subplot featuring Landry (Jesse Plemons) and Tyra (Adrianne Palicki) was panned by critics.

"Last Days of Summer" received positive reviews from critics. Eric Goldman of IGN gave the episode a "good" 7.6 out of 10 and wrote, "While the Tyra/Landry story leads to its own dramatic peak in the episode, it's thankfully not the conclusion of 'Last Days of Summer.' The actual final moments take place on the Panthers field and above them, and serve as a strong reminder of how touching Friday Night Lights can be. This episode is worrisome, but there's still plenty happening that displays how special this show is."

Scott Tobias of The A.V. Club gave the episode a "B+" grade, but criticized Landry and Tyra's subplot, "Okay, so what TV show are we watching again? It's not like this development is handled poorly, exactly. It's that it doesn't belong on Friday Night Lights, a show that excels at evoking the day-to-day drama of a football-obsessed town with the utmost verisimilitude. Murder and cover-ups are the province of cop shows and courtroom dramas; FNL has always been about common problems, not extraordinary ones."

Alan Sepinwall of The Star-Ledger wrote, "I understand that the ads the last few days have been mentioning a murder. Maybe that brings enough eyeballs to the set this evening to keep the show on the air a while. But, as with all the serial killers and hottie detectives who drifted through latter-era Homicide, I'm not sure that extending the show's lifespan is necessarily worth the cost of tarnishing the perfection we got last year." Leah Friedman of TV Guide wrote, "I'm not ready to classify the football as glorious just yet, what with this new Coach McGregor (the anti-Eric Taylor) and all, but the show itself is certainly back and in sublime form."

Andrew Johnston of Slant Magazine wrote, "for the most part, 'Last Days of Summer' is the best and most artful season premiere of a returning show since 'Guy Walks into a Psychiatrist's Office...,' the episode that began season two of The Sopranos, aired in January 2000." Rick Porter of Zap2it also criticized the subplot, writing, "I get that they're terrified, and that they're just kids, and especially that Tyra doesn't believe anyone will give her the benefit of the doubt. But their reaction after The Incident seemed out of character both for them and for the show, a detour into heightened drama that runs counter to what the show has always been about - "the smaller moments and the real moments," as executive producer Jason Katims says."

Brett Love of TV Squad wrote, "I wouldn't call this a great episode, because so much of it was about catching up and setting things in motion. I would call it a very good premiere though, because with that hour I am right back in the Friday Night Lights story, and very much looking forward to seeing what the rest of season two will be bringing us." Television Without Pity gave the episode a "B" grade.

Kyle Chandler submitted this episode for consideration for Outstanding Lead Actor in a Drama Series, while Aimee Teegarden submitted it for Outstanding Supporting Actress in a Drama Series, and Chris Mulkey submitted it for Outstanding Guest Actor in a Drama Series at the 60th Primetime Emmy Awards.
