= The Matchbreaker =

- Official poster
- Directed by: Caleb Vetter
- Screenplay by: Torry Martin; Marshal Younger
- Story by: Caleb Vetter; Wesley Elder
- Produced by: Wesley Elder; Caleb Vetter
- Starring: Wesley Elder; Christina Grimmie; Osric Chau; Tessa Violet; Victoria Jackson
- Cinematography: Cory Vetter
- Edited by: Caleb Vetter
- Music by: George Pauley
- Production company: Vetter Brothers Filmworks
- Distributed by: Stadium Media
- Release date: October 7, 2016 (U.S.)
- Running time: 94 minutes
- Country: United States
- Language: English

The Matchbreaker is a 2016 American romantic comedy film produced and directed by Caleb Vetter, and starring Wesley Elder, Christina Grimmie, Osric Chau, Victoria Jackson, and Tessa Violet. The film follows a man whose occupation is breaking up girls' relationships for their deploring parents, and at the same time trying to win over a girl he had a crush on in grade school.

The film premiered at Arclight Cinema Dome in Los Angeles on October 4, 2016, and was released in selected theaters on October 7. The film was released for digital download on December 6.

The film features the only motion picture performance by American singer Christina Grimmie, who was murdered four months prior to its release; it is dedicated to Grimmie's memory.

== Plot ==
The film opens with Ethan Cooper, a clerk at a computer repair shop, retelling a story to his roommate, Sam, about his long-lasting infatuation with a girl, Emily Atkins, whom he knew in elementary school.

One day, while visiting his sister Lexy, a florist, Ethan gets an offer from Mrs. Taylor to get rid of her daughter Veronica's boyfriend in exchange for money. He succeeds but accidentally causes Veronica to become infatuated with him. Mrs. Taylor recommends Ethan to other disapproving parents, thus making him a match-breaker and making his "business" prosperous.

Sometime later, he gets a yet another offer from a dissatisfied parent. Ethan meets her at a jazz club, where she apparently sings at nights. It turns out that the daughter is actually Emily Atkins, the same girl whom Ethan was gushing about to his roommate, Sam. Ethan decides to meet up with her again, this time at an art gallery, where Emily works.

Meanwhile, a puerile rich young man named Mitchell becomes interested in a waitress named Tricia. Unfortunately, his parents do not approve of his new-found love interest and they hire Ethan to dismantle the couple. Ethan goes on a double date with the couple, bringing Lexy along to act as his girlfriend. They try to make Mitchell and Tricia dislike each other but are unsuccessful.

Sometime after, Emily invites Ethan to a restaurant where Ethan learns Emily's apparent displeasure with her boyfriend. Later, Ethan gets a surprise visit from Emily's mother, from whom he learns that Emily has broken up with her boyfriend on her own. Her mother offers Ethan a reward, but he declines.

Ethan and Emily decide to hang out. Emily learns that Ethan had and still has a crush on her. Also, Ethan learns that Emily is not as flawless as he made her out to be. Despite her flaws, Ethan kisses Emily, but Emily disapproves of the kiss.

Emily gets a call from a friend who is in need of help and asks Ethan to come. It turns out that Emily is close friends with Tricia. Ethan learns that Tricia and Mitchell broke up. Annoyed with Veronica's affection with him, Ethan decides to tell her that he has no interest in her.

Sometime later, at a formal party, Emily notices a check written by her mother for Ethan in her mother's handbag. Ethan rushes over to the party as Sam texts him to let him know that someone is trying to move in on Emily. When he arrives, Emily, who is infuriated, confronts Ethan about the check. Ethan notices that Veronica has followed him. Engulfed with emotional trauma, Veronica exposes Ethan to be a match-breaker in front of a crowd, as she has stalked him since they first met.

The next day, Emily's mother tells Emily that Ethan refused to take the check for the assumed dismantlement of the couple. Meanwhile, overwhelmed with guilt, Ethan gets Mitchell back together with Tricia, and offers Mitchell's father, a record producer, to visit the jazz club tonight, where Emily will be performing. Later, Tricia informs Emily that Ethan helped Mitchell to win Tricia over again.

Six months later, Tricia and Mitchell have gotten engaged, and Ethan has written a relationship book and started a romantic relationship with Emily.

== Cast ==
- Wesley Elder as Ethan Cooper
- Christina Grimmie as Emily Atkins
- Osric Chau as Sam
- Olan Rogers as Mitchell
- Shawna Howson as Lexy Cooper
- Tessa Violet as Tricia
- Victoria Jackson as Mrs. Taylor
- Torry Martin as Tully Flanagan
- Ashley Shelton as Veronica
- Ben Davies as Brian
- Reylynn Caster as Lemonade Stand Girl

== Production ==
The shooting principally took place in Kansas City, Missouri, whose some of the landmarks can be seen, such as the Kauffman Center, The American, and the Green Lady Lounge, and in Leavenworth, Kansas. Leavenworth's landmarks were also featured in the film, such as the Leavenworth theatre and the Tampico Restaurant. The gas station, FavTrip, on the 4th street was also used during the filming, and some of the interior houses as well.

== Release ==
The film's first premiere was held at the Arclight Cinema Dome in Los Angeles on October 4, 2016. The premiere had an immense focus on honoring one of the lead stars of the film, Christina Grimmie, and it was attended by her family and friends. The second premiere was held in Caleb Vetter's home town of Kansas City, Missouri, at the Alamo Drafthouse. The film was released in selected theaters across the United States on October 7.

=== Home media ===
The film was released for digital download on December 6, 2016. It was released on DVD and Blu-ray on February 7, 2017. The film was released on Netflix in 2017. The film was released on Amazon Prime in 2018.

== Soundtrack ==
The soundtrack was released on November 29, 2016, in the U.S. by Vetter Brothers Filmworks. The soundtrack features songs whose vocals were provided by the actors themselves. The music was composed by George Pauley.

On December 6, 2016, a music video for the song "My Buddy" was released.

=== Track listing ===
No.	Title	Artist	Length
1.	"Whispering"	Christina Grimmie	03:21
2.	"By My Side"	Tony Ferrari	03:29
3.	"I'm Just Funny That Way"	Christina Grimmie	03:00
4.	"Cash Cash Money"	Tessa Violet	02:23
5.	"My Buddy"	Christina Grimmie	03:48
6.	"After You Get Want You Want"	Christina Grimmie	02:22
7.	"Get My Act Together"	Tony Ferrari	01:58
8.	"Perfect In Any Way (Score)"	George Pauley	02:01
9.	"You Remember Me! (Score)"	George Pauley	01:46
10.	"Prove Your Love (Score)"	George Pauley	00:49
11.	"She's Emily (Score)"	George Pauley	01:30
12.	"Skiddly Doo"	The Really Cool Jazz Cats	02:05
13.	"What Are You Doing After This?"	The Really Cool Jazz Cats	01:49
14.	"Shuffle on over Here"	The Really Cool Jazz Cats	02:17
15.	"Stroll in the Park"	The Really Cool Jazz Cats	01:59
Total length:			34:37
