= Elaine Castillo =

American novelist (born 1984)

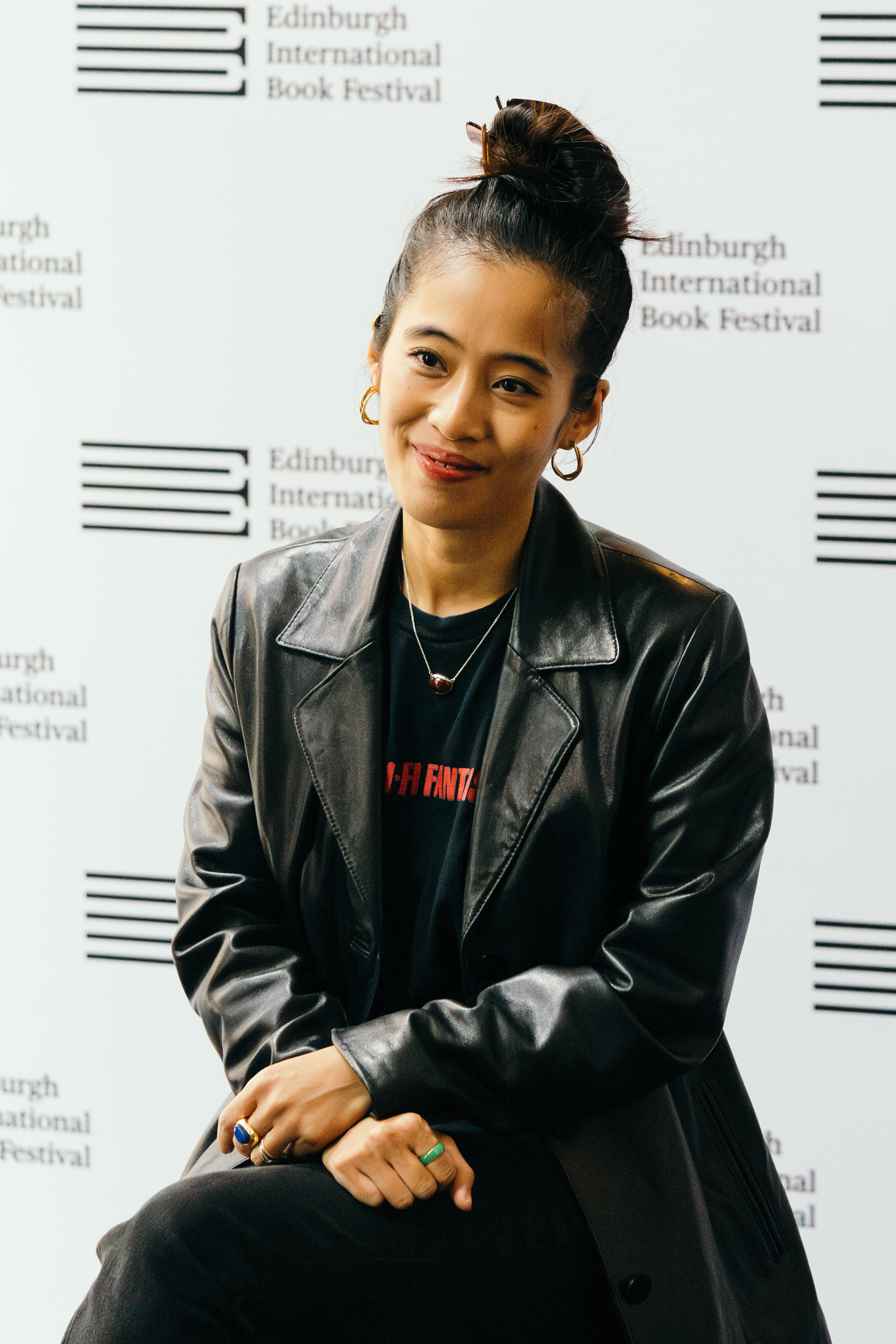
- Castillo at the 2025 Edinburgh International Book Festival
- Born: 1984 (age 41–42); Milpitas, California, U.S.
- Education: University of California, Berkeley; Goldsmiths, University of London (MA)
- Occupation: Writer
- Writing career
- Notable work: America Is Not the Heart (2018)
- Notable awards: Whiting Award (2026)

Elaine Castillo (born 1984) is a Filipino-American writer. She was born and raised in the San Francisco Bay Area and attended University of California, Berkeley. In 2009, Castillo moved to London and later received an MA in Creative & Life Writing from Goldsmiths, University of London. She was a three-time recipient of the Roselyn Schneider Eisner Prize for prose while at UC Berkeley, and she has also been nominated for the Pat Kavanagh Award, a Pushcart Prize, and a Gatewood Prize.

Her first novel, America Is Not the Heart, was published in 2018 and received widespread acclaim. Ligaya Mishan, writing for the New York Times Book Review, described the novel as "hungrily ambitious in sweep and documentary in detail, and reads like a seismograph of the aftershocks from trading one life for another." Maris Kreizman, wrote in Vulture that "the writing in America Is Not the Heart is tremendous, the descriptions evocative, and the characters will stay with you". Parts of the book take place in Milpitas, California, where Castillo grew up. The title of the novel is a reference to Carlos Bulosan's novel America Is in the Heart. Castillo is openly bisexual and has said it was important for her to write about bisexual women in her novel because of how rarely they are depicted. She is also of Filipino descent.

Her second novel, Moderation, was released on August 5, 2025.

She is the recipient of the 2026 Whiting Award in Fiction.

== Works ==
- Vinciguerra. iUniverse, 2001. Short story collection. ISBN 978-0595205387
- eden in the afternoon. iUniverse, 2001. Short story collection. ISBN 978-0595210435
- America Is Not the Heart. Viking, 2018. Novel. ISBN 978-0735222410
- How to Read Now: Essays. Viking, 2022. Essay collection. ISBN 978-0593489635
- Good Girl: Notes on Dog Rescue. Everand Originals, 2004. Essay (ebook). ISBN 978-1094456423
- Moderation. Viking, 2025. Novel. ISBN 978-0593489666
