= The Plaza Live =

Music venue in Orlando, Florida

- The Plaza Theater

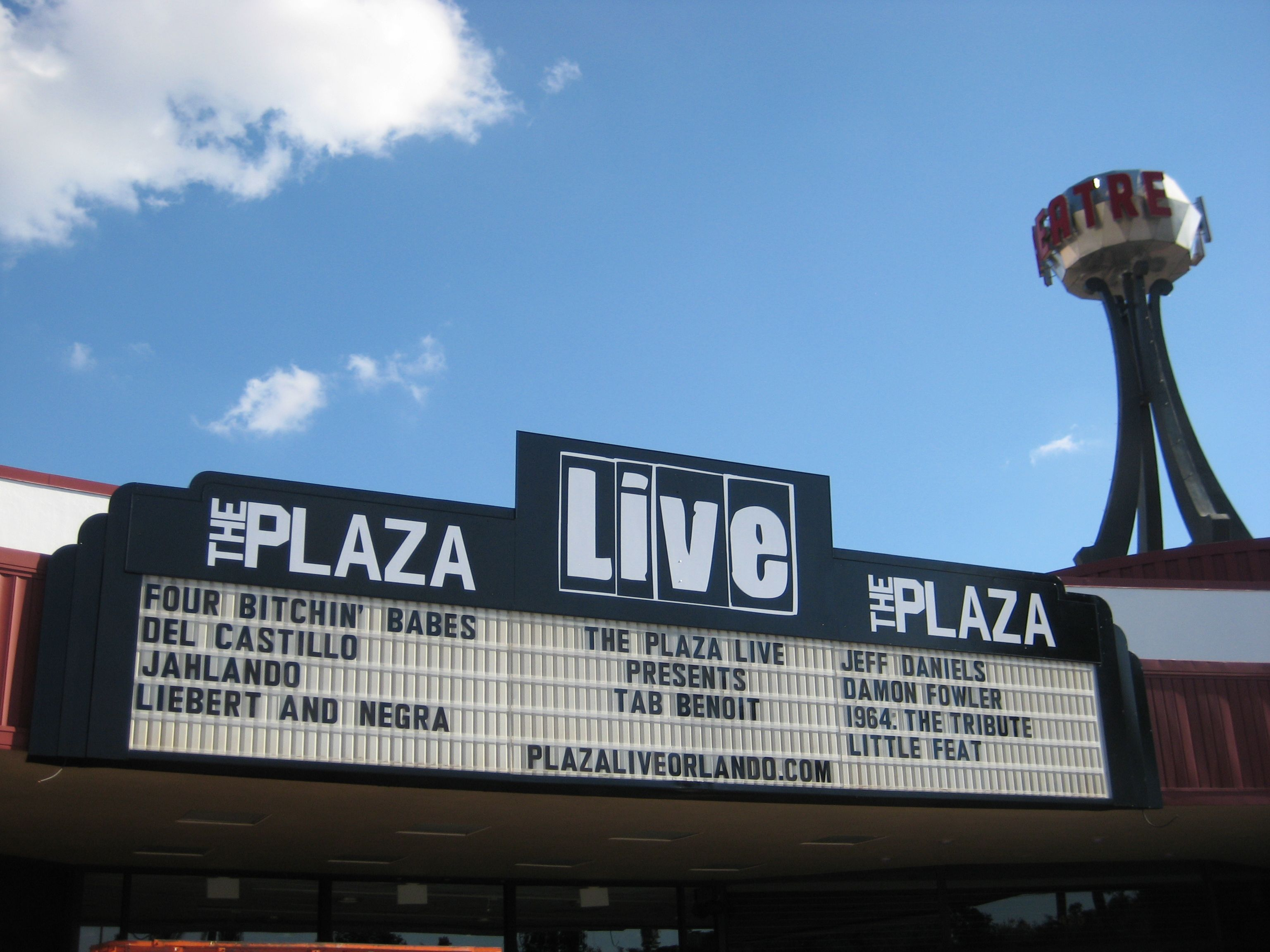
- The Plaza Live located in Orlando, Florida
- Interactive map of The Plaza Live
- Address: 425 North Bumby Avenue; Orlando, Florida, U.S.
- Coordinates: 28.5487°N 81.3513°W
- Owner: Orlando Philharmonic Orchestra
- Capacity: Large Room: 903 Seated, 1250 Standing
- Type: Live music venue

Construction
- Opened: 1963
- Years active: 63 years

Website
- www.plazaliveorlando.org

The Plaza Live is one of Orlando, Florida's oldest theaters. It was transformed from a cinema, to a theatre space, and finally a music venue. Having established a strong grass-roots following by doing many lower profile, local shows and events, the theater eventually started bringing in larger, national acts. The Plaza Live is home to two music halls: the main hall, and a second room for smaller shows.

== History ==
Dubbed the Rocking Chair Theatre by locals, The Plaza Live was Orlando's first two screen movie theatre. From the 1960s up until the early 1990s, the theater, small by today's standards, stayed active in a competitive market with declining ticket sales by showing second-run movies and the long running cult classic The Rocky Horror Picture Show. In 1992, the theater became The Dove Family Entertainment Theatre and changed format, performing only Christian-themed shows. Clearwater-based Salthouse Group purchased the 39-year-old venue in September 2002 for $1.7 million. In 2012 The Plaza removed the old rocking chairs and became a flex seating venue in the summer of 2010 so it could accommodate for standing room or fully seated shows.

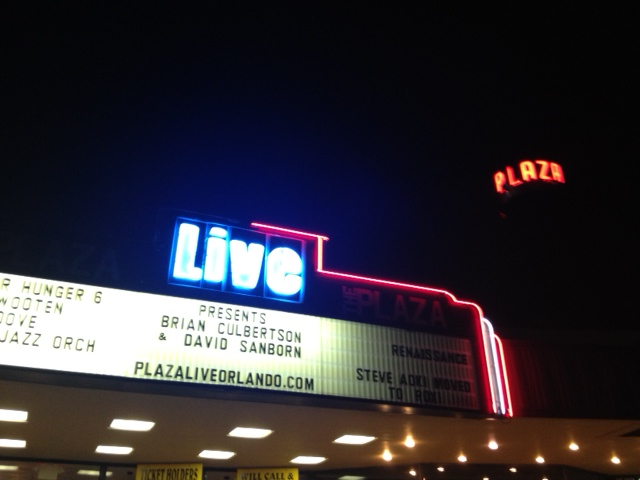
The Plaza Live Marquee

In August 2013, the Orlando Philharmonic Orchestra purchased The Plaza Live building, contents and the business for $3.4 million. The Philharmonic is currently planning extensive renovations to the historic building to create office space, a rehearsal hall and a music library, and update the existing 1000-seat music hall to accommodate chamber music concerts, while maintaining a schedule of rock, jazz, comedy and contemporary music events. The Plaza Live will continue to operate as one of Florida's premier concert venues during and after the renovations. This will give the Orlando Philharmonic a permanent home.

=== Murder of Christina Grimmie ===
On June 10, 2016, rising singer Christina Grimmie, known from YouTube and as a contestant on NBC's The Voice, was shot three times inside the venue after her concert while signing autographs and taking pictures with her fans. She died from her injuries and blood loss at the Orlando Regional Medical Center later that night. Her killer, identified by the Orlando Police Department as 27-year-old Kevin James Loibl from St. Petersburg, Florida, traveled from his hometown bringing two handguns, two loaded magazines, and a large hunting knife into the venue. Loibl was tackled by Christina's brother and shortly after, Loibl committed suicide by shooting himself. According to Orlando police, the bags of the attendees would normally have been checked, but there were no metal detectors at the venue, nor were the attendees frisked.

== The Main Hall ==
The Plaza has hosted many shows in the Main Hall including Ninja Sex Party, Bon Iver, The Civil Wars, Childish Gambino, Tory Lanez, Rick Springfield, Dark Star Orchestra, John Waite, Blue Öyster Cult, Edgar Winter, John Oates, Bonerama, Brandi Carlile, Michelle Branch, Hot Tuna, Marc Cohn, Here Come the Mummies, Gordon Lightfoot, Marc Broussard, Grace Potter, Keiko Matsui, Arturo Sandoval, Little Feat, Jeff Daniels, Gaelic Storm, Styx, Joe Bonamassa, Jason Bonham, The Fab Four, and many more.

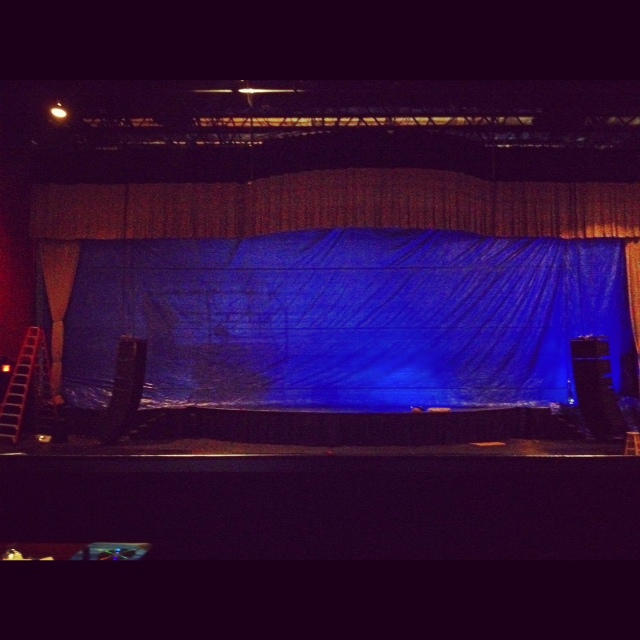
The Main Hall during 2012 renovations

== The Small Room ==
Since this space wasn't originally made to be a live music hall, starting in 2010, The Plaza began making improvements to the small room, making it more sound efficient for music performances. The facelift included a new PA system, acoustic treatment added to the walls for better sound, and the removal of the tiered floor to increase capacity. The improvements also included a remodeled lighting rig and a permanent sound booth to provide better overall sound quality. The Plaza has hosted many local and national acts in the small room including Rusted Root, The Lee Boys, Joshua Radin, Boyce Avenue, Old 97's, Zach Deputy, Tom Green, Beth McKee, Wanda Jackson, BoDeans, and many more.

After August 1, 2013, the small hall closed awaiting remodeling as an acoustic rehearsal hall for the Orlando Philharmonic Orchestra in Q3, 2014.

== Past shows ==
Some other shows hosted by the Plaza Live include Iron & Wine, Christina Grimmie, House of Heroes, Andrew Bird, The Subdudes, Janice Ian, Jenny Lewis, Air Supply, Victor Wooten, The Radiators, Pete Yorn, Copeland, Family Force 5, City and Colour, Tab Benoit, Five for Fighting, Duncan Sheik, Colin Hay, Four Bitchin Babes, Punch Brothers, John Waite, Michelle Branch, Bryan Adams, Blue Öyster Cult, Brandi Carlile, Of Montreal, The Naked and Famous, Rick Springfield, John Prine, Arlo Guthrie and many more.

The Plaza Live has hosted local festivals, as well, including Orlando's Jambando, Rock for Hunger and The Orange You Glad Music Festival 2012.
