= Invisible (Christina Grimmie song) =

Single by Christina Grimmie

from the album Side B and All Is Vanity
- Released: February 17, 2017
- Recorded: 2016
- Studio: Henson Studios (Hollywood, California)
- Genre: Pop; electropop
- Length: 3:36
- Label: ZXL Music, Inc.
- Songwriters: Christina Grimmie; Mark Merthe; Natalie Hawkins; Stephen Rezza; Nathaniel Lamm Evans

Christina Grimmie singles chronology
"Love Song To The Earth" (2015)	"Invisible" (2017)	"Sublime" (2017)

Music video
- "Invisible" on YouTube

"Invisible" is Christina Grimmie’s first posthumous single which was released on Friday, February 17, 2017, by UMG and Republic Records. The song was scheduled to be released on Tuesday, February 14, 2017 but due to Christina getting the major record deal for her posthumous music with her family they decided to release it on Friday, February 17, 2017. It was premiered exclusively on Elvis Duran Show on February 16, 2017 alongside the lyric video that was uploaded on Grimmie's official YouTube channel the same day. Later, the single was supplemented with an animated superhero music video on March 10, 2017.

== Music video ==
On Friday, March 10, 2017, Christina’s family and her team released the official music video for Invisible which features an anime character version of Christina, along with a friend, just two days before what would have been her 23rd birthday. In a message posted along with the anime-style clip, her family wrote, "Introducing the world premiere of the official video for Invisible. As many of you know, Christina loved video games and had a special fondness for anime. We created this video as a special tribute to honor that love and her desire to always bring light and love into the heart of others." In the clip directed by Stephen Leonard of Giant Pancake, Grimmie receives a magic hoverboard from a pink creature and sails through a city vaporizing evil creatures with beams of light that blast from her hands. As of February 2018, the video has over 750K views on YouTube while the lyrics video has over 1 million views.

== Personnel ==
Credits are adapted from the reference sources.

Personnel

- Christina Grimmie – lead vocals, songwriting
- Marcus Grimmie – guitar
- Neal Avron – mixing
- Stephen Rezza – producer, songwriting

== Track listing ==
Digital download
No.	Title	Length
1.	"Invisible"	3:36

Invisible (Remixes)
No.	Title	Length
1.	"Invisible" (Diamond Eyes Remix)	3:28
2.	"Invisible" (SETH Remix)	3:35
3.	"Invisible" (R!OT Remix)	3:23
Total length:		10:26

== Release history ==
Date	Format	Label(s)
February 17, 2017	Digital download	UMG; Republic Records; ZXL Music, Inc.
