= Bad Idea =

Bad Idea may refer to:

- Bad Idea (magazine), a British general interest magazine
- "Bad Idea" (Ariana Grande song), a 2019 song by Ariana Grande
- "Bad Idea" (YBN Cordae song), a 2019 song by YBN Cordae featuring Chance the Rapper
- "Bad Idea", a 1997 song by A from How Ace Are Buildings
- "Bad Idea", a 2015 song by Sara Bareilles from What's Inside: Songs from Waitress
- "Bad Idea!", a 2019 song by Girl in Red
- "Bad Idea", a 2022 song by Blind Channel
- "Bad Idea", a 2022 song by Dove Cameron

== See also ==
- Bad Ideas (disambiguation)
