= Find Me (EP) =

EP by Christina Grimmie
- Released: June 14, 2011
- Recorded: 2011
- Genre: Pop rock; hip hop; dance; R&B
- Length: 28:55
- Label: Independent

Christina Grimmie chronology
Find Me (2011)	With Love (2013)

Singles from Find Me
- 1. "Advice" Released: June 11, 2011; 2. "Liar Liar" Released: October 3, 2011

Find Me is the debut EP by American singer Christina Grimmie. The album was released for digital download on June 14, 2011. Physical copies of the album were sold at Grimmie's tour appearances and shows. The album was released independently and debuted at number 35 on the Billboard 200 chart in the US. The album entered the top 10 of the US Independent Albums, debuting and peaking at number six. The album also had success on the US Digital Albums chart (a component chart of the Billboard 200), debuting at number 11.

On the strength of digital downloads, "Liar Liar" debuted at number 15 on the US Top Heatseekers single chart.

== Background ==
=== Recording and development ===
Grimmie began posting covers of songs on her official YouTube account [zeldaxlove64] in the summer of 2009. According to Grimmie, her friend persuaded her to post her videos on the popular video sharing website. After receiving positive feedback for her performance, Grimmie began to regularly upload videos of herself performing covers, usually entitled "Me singing ...". For example, she posted videos of herself performing covers of the Miley Cyrus hits "Party in the U.S.A." and "When I Look at You". Getting more popular on YouTube, Grimmie eventually got in contact with Kurt Hugo Schneider (through fellow YouTube musician Tiffany Alvord whom she recorded a duet with). Schneider and Grimmie then recorded a medley of Miley Cyrus songs that quickly became one of Christina's most-viewed videos. After watching this video, Selena Gomez's stepfather Brian Teefey contacted Grimmie to be her manager.

Due to her popularity, Grimmie began getting media attention, leading The Hollywood Gossip to post an article about Grimmie and her music, comparing her to Selena Gomez. After the article was posted, buzz around Christina rose, and many began comparing her to fellow singer Rebecca Black, who rose to fame on YouTube as well. The comparisons only led to more interest in Grimmie. After gaining over 17,000,000 views on her videos, Grimmie focused on recording more original material. Despite wanting to post singles on iTunes, she stated she was instructed by her manager not to do so until she had a full album's worth of material. Hollywood Records's Selena Gomez & the Scene's former guitarist Ethan Roberts, wrote "Liar Liar" and "Unforgivable" with her.

== Release and promotion ==
The album had been anticipated since the beginning of 2011, when Grimmie announced she was working on an album, to be released later that year. The album was finally released digitally on June 14, 2011. The album saw no physical release, as it is only an extended play, and not Grimmie's official debut album. The eight track set was released not only in the United States, but also in Canada, Australia, Europe, and the United Kingdom. Find Me was offered for a low price of $5.99, which Grimmie said was so everyone could afford to buy it. The album was promoted mainly through the use of Grimmie's official YouTube channel. Christina often posted videos informing her viewers of the album's release date. The day before the album was released, Grimmie posted a twenty to thirty second clip of each song on the album on her official channel. Also, on June 13, Grimmie made an appearance on Good Day New York, in which after giving a short interview, she performed her debut single, "Advice." Later that day, she also did an interview on ABC News, in which she talked about the album, the tour, and her YouTube popularity. She also had interviews with music channel MTV, as well as ClevverTV. Grimmie also promoted the album by performing at the Concert For Hope, along with Selena Gomez & the Scene. During the concert, Christina performed two original songs, as well as one cover.

Aside from her televised performances, Grimmie also promoted the album by touring throughout the summer of 2011, as the opening act for Hollywood Records's Selena Gomez & the Scene. Selena Gomez's stepfather was Grimmie's manager, and booked the shows for Grimmie. The tour had 31 shows, all held in North America, spanning from St. Augustine, Florida to Las Vegas, Nevada. Grimmie performed first on the tour, followed by Allstar Weekend, who would then introduce Gomez & the Scene. The tour, titled the We Own the Night Tour, kicked off on July 24, 2011, in Costa Mesa, California, and ended on September 12 in Puyallup, Washington, lasting nearly six weeks.

In 2012, Grimmie released an acoustic version of the song Find Me in conjunction with DS2DIO for their show REMIXED.

=== Singles ===
- "Advice" serves as the album's lead single, released for airplay exclusively for Radio Disney on June 11, 2011. Upon its release, the song was met with generally positive reviews, with listeners rating the single highly with 95% of people who voted giving the song a positive review. It has peaked at number 3 at Radio Disney Top 30 Countdown. The music video was released on July 19, 2011.
- "Liar Liar" became Grimmie's first song to chart, when it debuted at number 15 on the Billboard Top Heatseekers chart in the US. "Liar Liar" was later released as a single on Radio Disney on October 3, 2011.

== Commercial performance ==
Find Me debuted at number 35 on the Billboard 200 chart in the US. The album entered the Top 10 of the Independent Albums in the US, debuting and peaking at number six.

== Track listing ==
No.	Title	Writer(s)	Producer(s)	Length
1.	"Ugly"	Christina Grimmie; Toby Gad	Gad	3:09
2.	"Unforgivable"	Grimmie	Teddy Scott	3:52
3.	"Advice"	Grimmie; Selena Gomez; Ethan Roberts	Roberts	3:35
4.	"King of Thieves"	Aimée Proal; Jens Gad; Vincent Stein; Konstantin Scherer	Beatzarre; Djorkaeff	4:30
5.	"Not Fragile"	Grimmie; Khara Lord; Brennan Aerts	Brennan Aerts	3:31
6.	"Find Me"	Grimmie; Roberts	Kurt Hugo Schneider	3:35
7.	"Liar Liar"	Grimmie; Roberts	Scott	3:25
8.	"Counting"	Grimmie; Lord; Aerts	Aerts	3:18
Total length:				28:55

== Charts ==
Chart (2011)	Peak position
Canadian Albums (Billboard)	44
US Billboard 200	35
US Independent Albums (Billboard)	6

== Release history ==
Region	Date	Format	Label
Australia	June 14, 2011	CD; Digital download	Independent
Canada	June 14, 2011	CD; Digital download	Independent
Ireland	June 14, 2011	CD; Digital download	Independent
United Kingdom	June 14, 2011	CD; Digital download	Independent
United States	June 14, 2011	CD; Digital download	Independent
