= Maybe Trapped Mostly Troubled =

Studio album by Tessa Violet
- Released: March 18, 2014
- Studios: Maker Music Studio, L.A. The Compound, Nashville, TN
- Genre: Pop
- Length: 31:07
- Label: Maker Music (0000001)
- Producer: Seth Earnest

Tessa Violet chronology
Maybe Trapped Mostly Troubled (2014)	Halloway (2016)

Maybe Trapped Mostly Troubled is the debut studio album by American musician Tessa Violet. It was released on March 18, 2014 by Maker Music on CD-R and digitally. The album had been removed from all streaming platforms prior to the release of a Deluxe Edition in 2026.

== Background ==
Maybe Trapped Mostly Troubled was released in March 2014. It was her debut album. Seth Earnest, who has worked with Tessa Violet since 2013, produced the album.

== Track listing ==
No.	Title	Length
1.	"Just Right"	3:22
2.	"Broken Record"	3:06
3.	"Small"	2:47
4.	"Make Me A Robot"	2:57
5.	"Like You Used To"	2:40
6.	"Tennessee"	3:16
7.	"Sorry I'm Not Sorry"	2:48
8.	"Spend Some Time"	2:36
9.	"This I Pray For You"	2:36
10.	"The Things I Do"	3:01
11.	"Now That We're Done"	1:56

== Reception ==
Appraising her YouTube work, We The Unicorns's Liam Dryden noted "[a]fter the release of album Maybe Trapped Mostly Troubled, Tessa has been quietly working on her next project." Later, reviewing her single "Dream" in 2016, Dryden said "she's been extremely hard at work on the follow-up to "Maybe Trapped, Mostly Troubled"; and it's all been completely worth it." Reviewing Bad Ideas in 2019, Scot Scoop's Zachary Khouri remarked "I’ll be searching for “Maybe Trapped Mostly Troubled,” wherever I can find it." Billboard's Hannah Malach described Maybe Trapped Mostly Troubled as "energetic."
