= Tessa Violet =

American singer-songwriter and video blogger (born 1990)

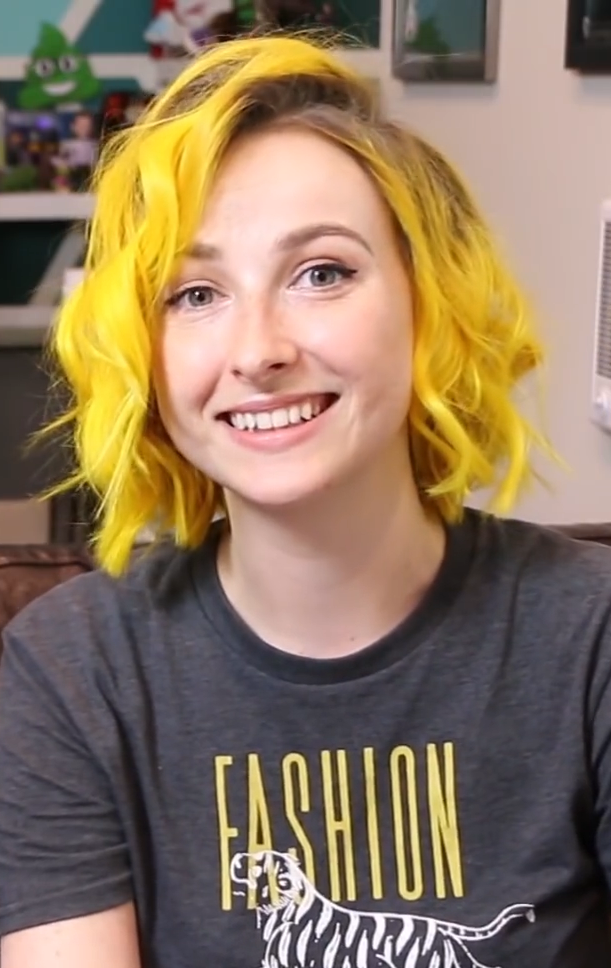
- Tessa Violet in 2018
- Born: March 20, 1990 (age 36); Chicago, Illinois, U.S.
- Other name: Meekakitty
- Occupations: Singer-songwriter; social media personality; director; model
- Years active: 2006–present
- Musical career
- Genre: Indie pop
- Instruments: Vocals; guitar; piano; ukulele
- Labels: Maker Music; T∆G Music

YouTube information
- Channel: Tessa Violet
- Genres: Music; vlogging
- Subscribers: 1.84 million
- Views: 255 million
- Last updated: April 23, 2026
- Website: tessa-violet.com

Tessa Violet Williams (born March 20, 1990) is an American singer-songwriter, social media personality, actress, and music video director.

Originally a vlogger under the username Meekakitty, Violet has since focused primarily on her music career. She has released three studio albums, Maybe Trapped Mostly Troubled (2014), Bad Ideas (2019), and My God! in 2023.

== Early life ==
Violet grew up in Ashland, Oregon and performed in theatre productions while in high school. She created her YouTube channel under the name Meekakitty in July 2006. In 2007, Violet began making daily vlogs for a school project while working in Hong Kong and Thailand as a fashion model.

== Career ==
After moving to New York City in 2009, Violet gained attention after winning $100,000 in a YouTube competition by receiving the most comments on her video entry. In 2011, Violet was featured in fellow YouTube creator Nanalew's unofficial music video for the song "Sail" by Awolnation. The video went viral and has since amassed over 370 million views. On September 24, 2012, Violet appeared in the music video for Family Force 5's "Cray Button" ft. Lecrae.

=== 2014–2018: Maybe Trapped Mostly Troubled and Halloway EP ===
Violet released her first album Maybe Trapped Mostly Troubled on March 18, 2014. The album was produced by Seth Earnest at Maker Studios, with John Zappin as A&R. Despite the lack of attention from traditional media sources, the record debuted at number 10 on the Billboard Heatseekers chart and sold 5,000 copies in the first three months.

Violet released the lead single "Dream" from her EP Halloway on September 16, 2016. The full EP was released October 14, 2016. She released videos for all songs on the project.

=== 2018–2022: Bad Ideas ===
In 2018, Violet revealed she was working on her second album, Bad Ideas. "Crush", the first single from the record, was released June 15, 2018. An accompanying music video directed by Big Forest was released on YouTube on the same day. As of January 2024, the music video has reached over 103.69 million views on YouTube. The single led to Violet being featured on YouTube's Artist On The Rise. The entire album was set to release on August 3, 2018, but instead was delayed and set to be released in three different parts. The album's title track, "Bad Ideas," was released as a single on November 30, 2018, alongside a music video. "I Like (the idea of) You" came out in May 2019. She released Bad Ideas (Act One) in July 2019, featuring remixes of the first three singles of the project. The plan for the project then changed to release the rest of the album all at once. It was released in full on October 25, 2019. The album contains 11 tracks, 6 of which had been released as singles (Crush, Bad Ideas, I Like (the idea of) You, and Games). The song was released via the label T∆G MUSIC. She promoted it with 'The Experience', a pre-recorded livestream show.

On November 5, Violet was featured on a remix of the I Dont Know How but They Found Me song "New Invention."

=== 2022–2025: My God! ===
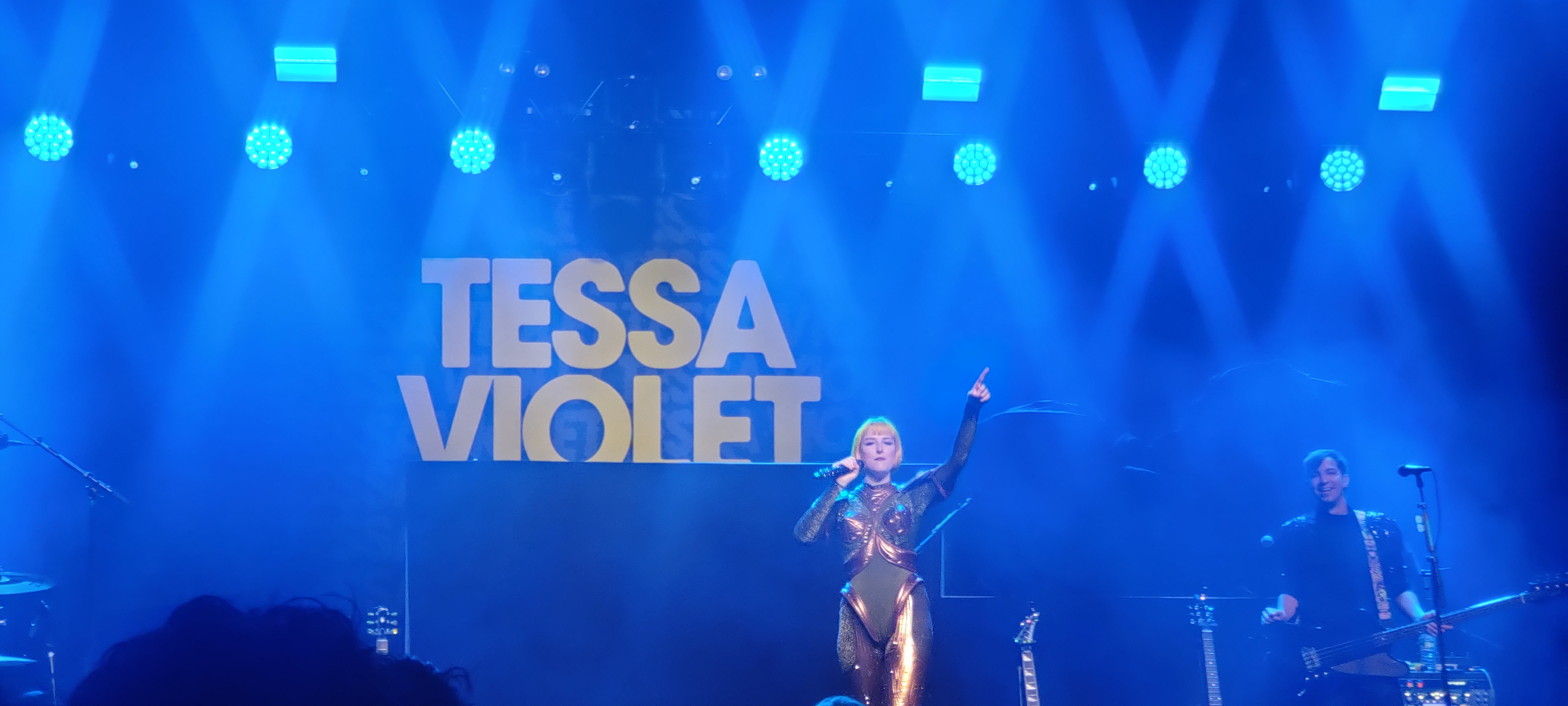
Tessa Violet performs at the Brooklyn Steel in 2023 as an opener for Half Alive

On February 15, 2022, Violet released "Yes Mom", the first single from her third studio album. She then opened for Cavetown on his 2022 US Tour, alongside Addison Grace.

On May 29, Daysormay released a version of their song "Role Model" featuring Violet. On June 1, Violet released the single "Breakdown", alongside the announcement of her Rise of the Phoenix tour with openers Will Joseph Cook and Daysormay, which ran from August to October 2022. On August 9, Violet released the single Kitchen Song, followed by a voice memo version of the song on August 16. On September 7, Violet featured on Will Joseph Cook's single "Gummy", which also appeared on his album Every Single Thing (2022). Violet then opened for Cavetown's 2022 UK and Europe Tour along with Orla Gartland from October to November 2022.

On March 21, 2023, Violet released the single "You Are Not My Friend". In April and May 2023, Violet toured as an opening act for the for Half Alive's “Conditions of a Punk” tour.

On June 9, Violet released the single "My God!", and announced her third studio album My God!, which released on July 14, 2023. Violet embarked on My God! The Tour in the United States and Europe to support the album, with Frances Forever as the opener, from July to September 2023.

On July 13, Violet released a video for her song "Bad Bitch", followed by the release of a single version of "Play with Fire", featuring Frances Forever, on August 16. She released My Body My Buddy originally in August 2024 and then later Gender Neutral in December 2024

=== 2026–present: There Will Be Joy ===
On January 6, 2026, Tessa Violet announced her fourth studio album, There Will Be Joy, and released the first single "Knowing". The song was produced by Cavetown.

== Influences ==
Violet cites artists such as Lorde, Bleachers, Lily Allen, Taylor Swift, Cavetown, Julia Michaels, and Fun among her influences. A PUP concert Violet attended in 2019 inspired her to delve into her punk-influenced upbringing for her "Games" collaboration with lovelytheband.

== Discography ==
=== Studio albums ===
List of EPs, with selected chart positions
Title	Album details	Peak chart positions	
Title	Album details	US Heat	US Indie
Maybe Trapped Mostly Troubled	Released: March 18, 2014; Label: Maker Music; Formats: LP, CD-R, digital download	10	47
Bad Ideas	Released: October 25, 2019; Label: T∆G Music; Formats: LP, digital download, streaming	19	48
My God!	Released: July 14, 2023; Label: T∆G Music; Formats: LP, CD, digital download, streaming	—	—

=== Collaborative albums ===
Title	Album details
You and Christmas (as a member of People You Know)	Released: November 11, 2014; Label: Self-released; Formats: Digital download
Leaves and Branches (as a member of People You Know)	Released: July 23, 2015; Label: Self-released; Formats: Digital download

=== Extended plays ===
Title	EP details
Halloway	Released: March 18, 2016; Label: Self-released; Formats: CD, digital download
Halloway B-Sides	Released: 2017; Label: Self-released; Formats: digital download
Bad Ideas (Act One)	Released: July 26, 2019; Label: T∆G Music; Formats: Vinyl, Digital download
Bad Ideas – The Remixes	Released: July 26, 2019; Label: T∆G Music; Formats: Digital download
Bloom	Released: September 1, 2026; Label: T∆G Music; Formats: Digital download

=== Singles ===
==== As lead artist ====
Title	Year	Album
"Dream"	2016	Halloway
"Not Over You"	2016	Halloway
"Crush"	2018	Bad Ideas
"Bad Ideas"	2018	Bad Ideas
"I Like (the Idea of) You"	2019	Bad Ideas
"Games" (solo or with lovelytheband)	2019	Bad Ideas
"Words Ain't Enough" (solo or with Chloe Moriondo)	2019	Bad Ideas
"Bored" (solo or with MisterWives)	2019	Bad Ideas
"Yes Mom"	2022	My God!
"Breakdown"	2022	My God!
"Kitchen Song"	2022	My God!
"You Are Not My Friend"	2023	My God!
"My God!"	2023	My God!
"Play with Fire" (solo or with Frances Forever)	2023	My God!
"My Body's My Buddy" (with Brye)	2024	Non-album single
"Knowing"	2026	There Will Be Joy
"I Love Being Wrong"	2026	There Will Be Joy
"Clean Up Song"	2026	There Will Be Joy
"Easy as Pie"	2026	There Will Be Joy
"Grow"	2026	There Will Be Joy

==== As featured artist ====
Title	Year	Album
"Where Did U Go" (Pop Culture featuring Tessa Violet)	2017	Non-album singles
"Crush + Someone Like You Mashup" (Pomplamoose featuring Tessa Violet)	2018	Non-album singles
"Monster Mashup" (Pomplamoose featuring Tessa Violet)	2018	Non-album singles
"Role Model" (Daysormay featuring Tessa Violet)	2020	Just Existing
"Smoke Signals" (Cavetown featuring Tessa Violet)	2020	Non-album single
"New Invention" (I Dont Know How but They Found Me featuring Tessa Violet)	2021	Razzmatazz (Deluxe Edition)
"Gummy" (Will Joseph Cook featuring Tessa Violet)	2022	Non-album single

==== Other appearances ====
Title	Year	Other artist(s)	Album
"I Wan'na Be Like You"	2016	—N/a	Everybody Loves Disney
"Cash Cash Money"	2016	—N/a	The Matchbreaker (Original Motion Picture Soundtrack)
"Feelings Are Fatal"	2019	mxmtoon	Plum Blossom (The Edits)

=== Music videos ===
Title	Year	Director
"Sorry I'm Not Sorry"	2016	Evan Spencer Bruce
"Dream"	2016	Isaac White
"Not Over You"	2016	Tessa Violet
"Haze"	2016	Sean O'Halloran
"On My Own"	2016	Shawna Howson
"I Don't Get to Say I Love You Anymore"	2016	Sean O'Halloran
"Crush"	2018	Jordan Harms & Isaac White
"Bad Ideas"	2018	Jade Ehlers
"I Like (the idea of) You"	2019	Jade Ehlers
"Games" (official lyric video)	2019	Jade Ehlers
"Bored"	2020	Jade Ehlers
"Words Ain't Enough"	2020	—N/a
"Wishful Drinking"	2020	Rachel Reizin
"Bad Bitch"	2023	Mariel & Marita Gomsrud
"My God!"	2023	Lindsey Blane

=== Covers ===
Title	Original artist	Year
"Boats and Birds"	Gregory and the Hawk	2016
"I Wan'na Be Like You"	Disney Songs	2016
"Lonely Boy"	The Black Keys	2016
"So This is Love" (Featuring Jon Cozart)	N/A	2016
"Moon Song" (Featuring Hazel Hayes)	Karen O	2016
"Your Life Over Mine"	Bry	2017
"Pity Party"	Melanie Martinez	2017
"Cannibal Queen"	Miniature Tigers	2017
"Teenage Dream" (Featuring Dodie)	Katy Perry	2017
"Crazy" (Featuring Dodie)	Patsy Cline	2017
"Crazy Human Psycho Crush – Mshup" (Human, I Go Crazy, Crush, Psycho) (with Orla Gartland, Dodie, & Lauren Aquilina)	Of Orla Gartland, Dodie, & Lauren Aquilina	2018
Insecurity Mashup 2" (Cool Girl, Swap Places, Pretending, Games) (with Lauren Aquilina, Orla Gartland, and Dodie)	Of Orla Gartland, Dodie, & Lauren Aquilina	2021
