= Bad Ideas (Friday Night Lights) =

- Friday Night Lights episode
- Episode no.: Season 2 Episode 2
- Directed by: Jeffrey Reiner
- Written by: Elizabeth Heldens
- Cinematography by: David Boyd
- Editing by: Ron Rosen
- Original release date: October 12, 2007
- Running time: 43 minutes

Guest appearances
- Glenn Morshower as Chad Clarke; Chris Mulkey as Coach Bill McGregor; Brad Leland as Buddy Garrity; Daniella Alonso as Carlotta Alonso; Taylor Nichols as Kevin

Episode chronology
← Previous "Last Days of Summer"	Next → "Are You Ready for Friday Night?"
- Friday Night Lights (season 2)

"Bad Ideas" is the second episode of the second season of the American sports drama television series Friday Night Lights, inspired by the 1990 nonfiction book by H. G. Bissinger. It is the 24th overall episode of the series and was written by co-executive producer Elizabeth Heldens and directed by executive producer Jeffrey Reiner. It originally aired on NBC on October 12, 2007.

The series is set in the fictional town of Dillon, a small, close-knit community in rural West Texas. It follows a high school football team, the Dillon Panthers. It features a set of characters, primarily connected to Coach Eric Taylor, his wife Tami, and their daughter Julie. In the episode, Eric faces problems at Austin, while Julie's relationship with Matt dwindles. Meanwhile, Jason gets an advice, and Landry and Tyra try to move on from the incident.

According to Nielsen Media Research, the episode was seen by an estimated 5.46 million household viewers and gained a 1.9 ratings share among adults aged 18–49. The episode received positive reviews from critics, who praised the performances, but heavily criticized Landry and Tyra's subplot.

== Plot ==
At TMU, Eric (Kyle Chandler) is constantly challenged by his head coach, especially as a player named Antwone Beltraine (Mitchell Adams) was caught taking bribes for the games. After calling him out on his attitude, Eric convinces the board to just suspend Antoine for three games. Back in Dillon, McGregor (Chris Mulkey) is prioritizing Smash (Gaius Charles) over the rest of the players, and fame is getting in Smash's head.

Julie (Aimee Teegarden) continues evading Matt (Zach Gilford) by ignoring his calls and not letting him pick her up from home. Matt, meanwhile, has a new live-in nurse named Carlotta (Daniella Alonso), who is taking care of Lorraine (Louanne Stephens). Julie continues flirting with her lifeguard partner, the Swede (Shakey Graves), but is annoyed that he never responds to her advances. While giving her a ride to a Panthers prep rally, Julie suddenly kisses the Swede on the lips before leaving. She meets with Matt, who is upset that she missed the event. She finally admits her problems with their new status, and Matt storms, their relationship over.

During a visit to a doctor, Jason (Scott Porter) is told that his hand muscles are improving, but the doctor reiterates that it is no sign about a possible recovery. Jason's friend, Steve (Mark Zupan), tells Jason about a possible stem cell facility in Mexico that could help him. He has an encounter with Tami (Connie Britton), expressing that he wants to walk again. Tami has hired a new replacement, Glenn (Steven Walters), to cover for her at school, but he also takes his time in helping her at home. During a visit to the doctor, Tami breaks down when she admits she needs Eric's assistance.

Landry (Jesse Plemons) is still affected by the death of the stalker, and this impacts his football career. While his father Chad (Glenn Morshower) shows support, Landry is still conflicted. He raises his concerns to Tyra (Adrianne Palicki), who tells him that he needs to move on from the incident and "act like a man." Landry then calls her out on her selfishness, expressing how he must live with the fact that he killed a man for her. That night, Tyra visits him at home, finally opening up about the man's death. She admits that she is glad he died, but also cries when she says she should've killed him. They both embrace, and then kiss.

== Production ==
=== Development ===
In September 2007, NBC announced that the second episode of the season would be titled "Bad Ideas". The episode was written by co-executive producer Elizabeth Heldens and directed by executive producer Jeffrey Reiner. This was Heldens' fifth writing credit, and Reiner's tenth directing credit.

== Reception ==
=== Viewers ===
In its original American broadcast, "Bad Ideas" was seen by an estimated 5.46 million household viewers with a 1.9 in the 18–49 demographics. This means that 1.9 percent of all households with televisions watched the episode. It finished 75th out of 97 programs airing from October 8–14, 2007. This was a 15% decrease in viewership from the previous episode, which was watched by an estimated 6.37 million household viewers with a 2.2 in the 18–49 demographics.

=== Critical reviews ===
"Bad Ideas" received positive reviews from critics. Eric Goldman of IGN gave the episode a "good" 7.9 out of 10 and wrote, "I'm hardly the only one to evoke it this week, but yes, I too thought of I Know What You Did Last Summer, which isn't good considering how un-Friday Night Lights it feels. This is a show so grounded in reality, so wonderful because of its 'you are here' feeling, that it's startling to have a story that takes you out of that and feels like something from, well, a TV show. Even if the show manages to handle the fallout of these events in a strong manner, it just seems incredibly ill-advised from the get go and it's a shame they decided to go there."

Scott Tobias of The A.V. Club gave the episode a "B+" grade and wrote, "One week after the VBM (Very Bad Mistake) of Landry braining Tyra's attacker with a pipe, I'm beginning to regret calling it a VBM at all. Much as I hate to consider Landry as a killer — however understandable his actions were at the time — the situation has shown him in a new light and drawn out facets of his character that might not have surfaced otherwise."

Alan Sepinwall wrote, "Okay, so that's cruder and maybe more reductive than the love confession scene at the episode's end deserves. Jesse Plemons played the hell out of that moment and out of Landry's overall anguish over what he did, but I hate that the writers had to contrive this character-redefining, series-altering development to accomplish a goal that could have easily been met under different circumstances." Leah Friedman of TV Guide wrote, "Regular readers of this blog know that this show make me cry on a pretty regular basis. Tonight's episode was no exception, though I'm not sure what part was most affecting."

Andrew Johnston of Slant Magazine wrote, "Cynical fans of Friday Night Lights may argue that the title of season two’s second episode describes the writers' actions as well as the characters': Exiling Coach Taylor to Austin, sticking Landry on the team, bringing the stalker back, having Landry kill him... all bad ideas. On the other hand, if FNL is going to do stories like this, they're being done about as well as they possibly could be." Rick Porter of Zap2it wrote, "Adrianne Palicki and Jesse Plemons are acting the heck out of the material they've been given, but it's so out of the realm of the rest of the show that it's like a clanging gong every time The Incident comes up."

Brett Love of TV Squad wrote, "Overall, I'd say the show is a little bit off from season one. For me, the Tyra/Landry story is dragging it down, but it's still a very good show, and well worth watching to see if it can all be worked out." Television Without Pity gave the episode a "B" grade.

Connie Britton and Adrianne Palicki submitted this episode for consideration for Outstanding Supporting Actress in a Drama Series at the 60th Primetime Emmy Awards.
