= Moderation (novel) =

2025 novel

- Author: Elaine Castillo
- Language: English
- Publication date: 2025

Moderation is a 2025 novel by Filipino-American writer Elaine Castillo.

== Publishing history ==
The novel was edited by Laura Tisdel of Viking Press and James Roxburgh of Atlantic Books.

== Themes and analysis ==
Sarah Rose Etter of The Atlantic wrote that the novel was a "rendering of a woman suppressing everything inside of her to earn a paycheck, to keep going, to get the job done," saying that it was, "at its core, a book about the moment when everything we’ve been repressing comes back to the surface. You can hide from yourself for only so long: until the workday ends, until your favorite show is over, until the feed runs out of content, until the digital tide recedes and all that is left is your broken, beautiful life."

Yagnishsing Dawoor of The Guardian compared the novel to Ling Ma's 2018 novel Severance, citing the "twinned look at labour and immigration," adding that the novel "frames VR’s healing power – from treating PTSD and phobias to providing pain relief and easing suicidal thoughts – within a darker tale of its co-option for profit, control and surveillance. Castillo is interested in the overlap between rightwing politics, tech culture and historiography." Stuart Kelly of The Scotsman noted the novel's "analysis of how service and caring can transform into sifting and scrubbing the digital world," saying that "Girlie’s plot is driven by money. She is acutely aware of the gradations and nuances (one restaurant is described as “bourgeois aspirational, not flat-out oligarchic”), she knows the indebtedness means more than a credit arrangement."

Glenn Diaz of Rolling Stone Philippines noted that "amid the dense meditation on the vagaries of Big Tech and capital and hypermodernity: on why so many skilled moderators happen to be Filipinos, the book points to the vectors of empire, the 'glowing line that trailed through them, all the way back to that first early Pinay, a twentieth-century almost-girl, being taught by a white woman how to administer quinine to a malaria patient.'"

Writing in Publishers Weekly, Castillo stated that she wanted "to write a novel about the tech industry. But I did want to write a novel about the many custodians, visible and invisible, who shape our online lives; about the possibility of connection, repair, and transformation in a world where such things might seem impossible; and about love itself as a practice of worldbuilding."

== Reception ==
Kirkus Reviews reviewed the book as a "brilliant novel with much to say about work, family, excess, identity, and love." Publishers Weekly described the novel as "masterful," saying that "Castillo shifts seamlessly in scale and tone, from a wide-angled systems novel to a love story, and from barbed satire to staggering emotional depth. It’s a triumph."

Writing for Locus Magazine, Niall Harrison wrote that "the romance is in the foreground, which means the science fiction is in the background," and was "a story made fresh by a vivid and dexterous narrative voice, a voice that is by turns sardonically attentive to the specificities of each world and alive to the interfaces between them. A voice that lays worlds open for us to read." Rhoda Feng of The New York Times wrote that "Castillo’s close third-person narration, and her unerring ear for social performance, make for a novel that is often baroquely funny, full of barbed observations that detonate like precision-guided bombs," adding that "A logline for the book might have read: “Pride and Prejudice” for the age of platform capitalism."

Billie Walker of The Big Issue wrote that "Unfortunately, Castillo’s novel is so focused on its romantic plotline that the issues of our tech-dominated society and the billionaires that control the market are of little focus, waved off in summarising dialogue with little nuance or further critique. Castillo assumes her audience’s stance to her detriment, making moderation subscriptive and limiting even in its expansive virtual world." Alex Peake-Tomkinson of The Spectator wrote that "Castillo has important things to say about the internet, trauma and true connection, but it’s a shame that this novel wasn’t polished to make it clearer or more enjoyable to read." Stuart Kelly of The Scotsman praised the novel for having "lots and lots of meaty ideas, political sass and scrunchy wit," but expressed disappointment in the ending, calling the novel "strangely vexatious."
