= Christina Grimmie =

American singer and YouTuber (1994–2016)

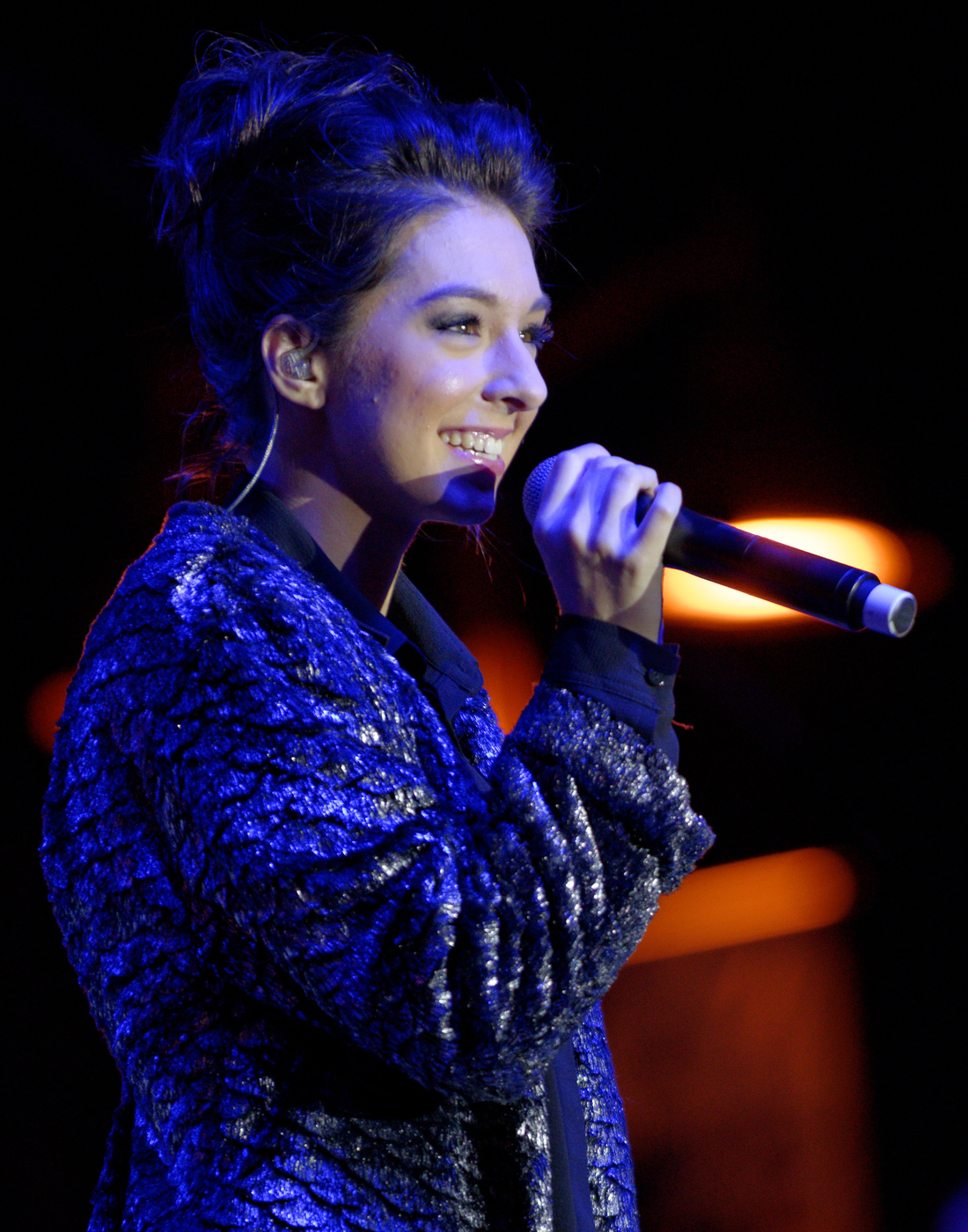
- Grimmie in 2014
- Born: Christina Victoria Grimmie; March 12, 1994; Marlton, New Jersey, U.S.
- Died: June 10, 2016 (aged 22); Orlando, Florida, U.S.
- Cause of death: Gunshot wounds
- Burial place: Berlin Cemetery, Berlin, New Jersey
- Occupations: Singer; songwriter; YouTuber; actress
- Years active: 2009–2016
- Musical career
- Genre: Pop
- Instruments: Vocals; piano
- Labels: Island; Republic

YouTube information
- Channel: zeldaxlove64 Christina Grimmie
- Genres: Music; vlog
- Subscribers: 3.85 million
- Views: 721 million
- Last updated: October 22, 2026
- Website: christinagrimmie.com

Christina Victoria Grimmie (March 12, 1994 - June 10, 2016) was an American singer, songwriter, and internet personality. In 2009, she began posting covers of popular songs on YouTube. After releasing her debut EP, Find Me (2011), her YouTube channel reached one million subscribers. After she reached two million subscribers, she released her debut studio album, With Love (2013).

Grimmie then became a contestant on season six of The Voice, finishing in third place. Adam Levine, her coach on the show, announced in the finale that, regardless of the results, he would sign her to his label 222 Records. Lil Wayne also offered to sign her to his label, Young Money Entertainment. She was signed with Island Records for a short time before being dropped. Grimmie released her second EP, Side A, in 2016. That same year, she took on an acting role, making her only motion-picture appearance in The Matchbreaker.

== Early life ==
Christina Victoria Grimmie was born to Tina (née Milos) and Albert Grimmie in the Marlton section of Evesham Township, New Jersey, on March 12, 1994. Her mother worked as a receptionist until she was diagnosed with breast cancer. Her father worked at Verizon Communications as of 2014. She had an older brother, Marcus, but since he moved out in 2008 she was raised like an only child. Later, he worked as her road manager during her performances.

Grimmie was of Italian and Romanian descent and grew up in Marlton, where she attended Bethel Baptist Christian School, Marlton Middle School, and Cherokee High School. Her father noticed Grimmie's talent for singing when she was six years old, and she started playing the piano at age 10. Despite having received piano lessons, Grimmie said she played by ear.

== Career ==
=== 2009–2011: YouTube recognition and discovery ===
Grimmie began posting videos to her YouTube channel in 2009 at age 15, under the username of zeldaxlove64. Grimmie stated that she began a musical YouTube channel so that people could connect with her music and because her friend persuaded her to post her videos on YouTube. The first video Grimmie uploaded was a cover of Hannah Montana's "Don't Wanna Be Torn".

She first earned recognition for her cover of Miley Cyrus's "Party in the U.S.A." in August 2009. Grimmie's covers first gained attention and stood out due to her voice, personality, and interpretations of well-known songs.

Grimmie was homeschooled for her junior year of high school in 2010. That same year, she covered Nelly's "Just a Dream" with fellow YouTubers Sam Tsui and Kurt Hugo Schneider in a video which received more than 190 million views over the course of ten years. Later, it also became available on iTunes and Spotify. In 2011, she placed No. 2 in the MyYouTube competition, behind Selena Gomez. As her popularity grew on YouTube, Grimmie was discovered by Gomez's mother, Mandy Teefey; Teefey and her husband Brian soon became Grimmie's managers.

=== 2011: Find Me ===
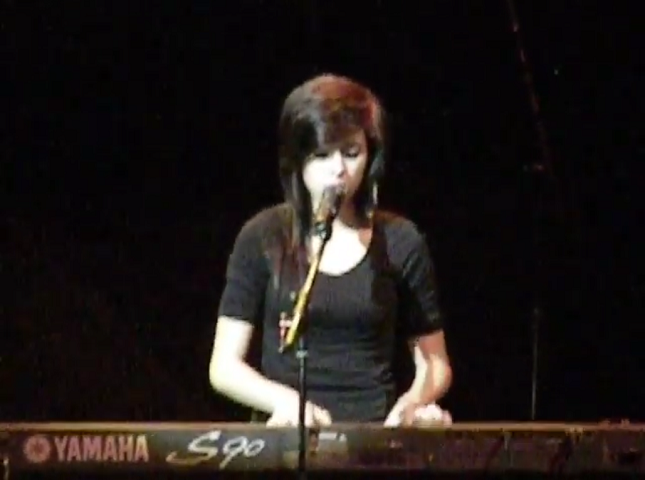
Grimmie performing in 2011

Grimmie performed in the UNICEF charity concert, and also performed backup vocals for Selena Gomez & the Scene; she appeared on the first DigiTour in 2011, which was created specifically for YouTube artists. Gomez became her mentor. Grimmie appeared on the Billboard Social 50; she also opened for Selena Gomez & the Scene, Allstar Weekend and the Jonas Brothers during the Concert of Hope. She toured for six weeks with Selena Gomez & the Scene opening for them in the We Own the Night Tour.

She released an EP entitled Find Me, on June 14, 2011. The album was released independently and debuted at number 35 on the Billboard 200 chart in the US. Her debut single "Advice" was released to Radio Disney on June 11, with the music video, directed by Sean Babas, being released on July 19 on her YouTube channel. She appeared on The Ellen DeGeneres Show with fellow YouTuber Tyler Ward, performing a cover to Lil Wayne's "How to Love"; the episode aired on October 10.

On November 20, Grimmie performed at the 39th American Music Awards of 2011 pre-show alongside Taio Cruz to a special rendition of "Higher" and also won her first award. She also performed her song "Not Fragile" at the Coca-Cola Red Carpet Show along with Selena Gomez & the Scene. She and the band then appeared together in a commercial for Xbox's Kinect. Grimmie also appeared in a commercial for Doritos that same month. Grimmie was the special musical guest performing her hit song "Advice" on Disney Channel's So Random!, which premiered on December 11.

=== 2012–2013: With Love ===
In January 2012, Grimmie moved to Los Angeles to pursue her singing career; she was signed in April to Creative Artists Agency. On Disney.com, she starred in the web show Power Up: with Christina Grimmie, which ran from March 29 to June 5. She also revealed that she would be working with a new band, Rising Tide, a teen group originally from her hometown area in New Jersey. A stripped version of Grimmie's original song "Find Me" was released on ITunes in June, and reached the front page later in July. Though Grimmie's channel mostly focused on covers and original music, she also started pursuing other interests.

By April 2013, Grimmie's channel had more than 375 million views and two million subscribers. She then opened for Gomez during the North American leg of her Stars Dance Tour, performing songs from her debut album With Love, which was released on August 6, 2013. On October 3, Grimmie's music video for "Tell My Mama" was given its exclusive premiere on Billboard.com. Grimmie said the video is "about a guy that I start liking in school, and he's sort of a dangerous kid, and I am the type of girl that tells my mom about everything." In January 2014, Grimmie appeared on an episode of the podcast Shane and Friends; Dawson was a friend of Grimmie's.

=== 2014: The Voice ===
Grimmie auditioned for season 6 of NBC's singing competition, The Voice, as revealed on her Facebook page. During the Blind Auditions, she performed Miley Cyrus' hit song "Wrecking Ball". All four coaches, Adam Levine, Usher, Shakira, and Blake Shelton, "turned their chairs" for her. She opted for Levine after he told her that she had the potential to be a "huge star" due to her voice and stage presence. Selena Gomez supported Grimmie during her audition, and Justin Bieber, an artist Grimmie had frequently covered on YouTube, supported her during the finale. She finished in 3rd place, behind winner Josh Kaufman and runner-up Jake Worthington. Host Carson Daly later said he was "shocked" Grimmie did not win. All of Grimmie's performances were released on iTunes and Spotify as studio versions.

– Studio version of performance reached the top 10 on iTunes

Stage	Song	Original artist	Date	Order	Result
Blind audition	"Wrecking Ball"	Miley Cyrus	February 24, 2014	1.1	All four chairs turned Joined Team Adam
Battles, Round 1	"I Knew You Were Trouble" (vs. Joshua Howard)	Taylor Swift	March 25, 2014	11.4	Saved by coach
Battles, Round 2	"Counting Stars" (vs. Sam Behymer)	OneRepublic	March 31, 2014	12.4	Saved by coach
Playoffs	"I Won't Give Up"	Jason Mraz	April 14, 2014	18.10	Saved by coach
Live Top 12	"Dark Horse"	Katy Perry	April 21, 2014	20.6	Saved by Public Vote
Live Top 10	"Hold On, We're Going Home"	Drake feat. Majid Jordan	April 28, 2014	22.5	Saved by Public Vote
Live Top 8 (Quarterfinals)	"How to Love"	Lil Wayne	May 5, 2014	24.8	Saved by Public Vote
Live Top 5 (Semifinals)	"Hide and Seek"	Imogen Heap	May 12, 2014	26.5	Saved by Twitter Instant Save (performed "Apologize")
Live Top 5 (Semifinals)	"Some Nights"	Fun	May 12, 2014	26.9	Saved by Twitter Instant Save (performed "Apologize")
Live Top 3	"Wrecking Ball"	Miley Cyrus	May 19, 2014	28.1	Continued on Finale
Live Top 3	"Somebody That I Used to Know" (with Adam Levine)	Gotye feat. Kimbra	May 19, 2014	28.5	Continued on Finale
Live Top 3	"Can't Help Falling in Love"	Elvis Presley	May 19, 2014	28.8	Continued on Finale
Live Finale	"All of the Stars" (with Ed Sheeran)	Ed Sheeran	May 20, 2014	29.3	Third place
Live Finale	"Team" (with Bria Kelly, Tess Boyer and Jake Barker)	Lorde	May 20, 2014	29.12	Third place
Quarterfinals (Season 7)	"With Love" (special guest performance)	Christina Grimmie	December 2, 2014	23.1	Special Guest Appearance

=== 2014–2016: Post-The Voice and major label debut ===
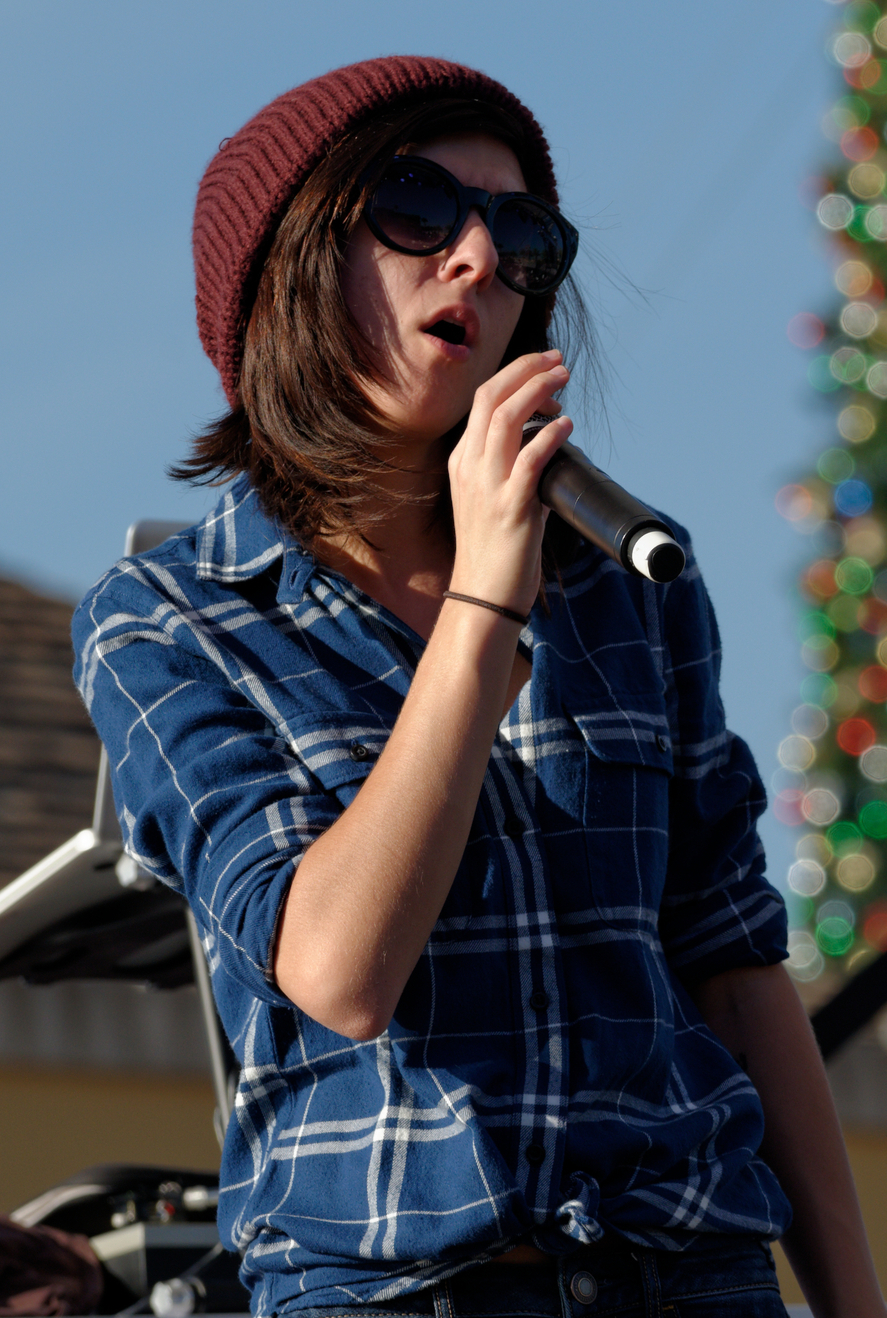
Grimmie performing in Los Angeles in November 2014

During The Voice, Levine expressed his desire to sign Grimmie to his record label, 222 Records; Lil Wayne also showed interest in signing her to Young Money Entertainment. She ultimately chose to sign with Island Records. She toured with previous contestants of The Voice, including season 5 winner Tessanne Chin, runner-up Jacquie Lee, Will Champlin, season 1 runner-up Dia Frampton, season 6 winner Josh Kaufman, runner-up Jake Worthington, and fellow season 6 contestants Kristen Merlin and Jake Barker. The Voice Summer tour started on June 21, 2014, in San Antonio, Texas.

Grimmie was writing and recording music for her sophomore album, her third major release, and first release since being signed to a label. The lead single was expected to be released in July, with the album following later in the year. Grimmie announced via Facebook that filming for the lyric video for the single started on July 6.

On July 11, she announced that her new single would be called "Must Be Love". On July 15, she announced via a live stream that the song would be released on July 31. "Must Be Love" was produced by Elof Loelv and recorded at ZAC Recording in Atlanta, Georgia.

In February 2015, Grimmie collaborated with Dove Cameron and made a music video for "What A Girl Is", an original song from Cameron's show Liv and Maddie. The music video was released on Grimmie's channel and Disney's YouTube channel. It was also promoted on the official channel. On March 4, Grimmie announced that she had been dropped from Island Records and that she was working on a new album set to be released in late 2015.

The new single from the album, "Cliché", was released on March 16. On April 27, Grimmie released her second single, "Stay with Me", a collaboration with Diamond Eyes, which climbed to No. 5 on the iTunes Electronic Charts. The song also was included on 2015 UKF Dubstep, an album showcasing the top dubstep songs of the year. She was a contestant in the iHeartRadio/Macy's Rising Star Contest. On May 27, Grimmie was revealed as the winner of the contest, securing her spot to open the 2015 iHeartRadio Music Festival in September.

On July 2, she released her third single, "Shrug". In September, she was one of 16 international artists, including Paul McCartney, to record the charity single "Love Song to the Earth", which raises climate change awareness. Grimmie returned to The Voice for season 9, to promote Kohl's fashion.

On February 21, 2016, Grimmie released her second EP, titled Side A, which consisted of four songs. Grimmie said Side B was likely to follow. She had hoped to release a second full-length album by the end of the year.

=== Posthumous releases ===
Grimmie had made a four-part video series for Side A comprising "The Ballad of Jessica Blue"; in July 2016, Brian Teefey announced that the videos would debut via Billboard then be featured on her YouTube channel. The first video, for the song "Snow White", debuted on August 11. The second video, for "Anybody's You", debuted on August 18. "Deception" debuted on August 25; "Without Him" on September 1.

Grimmie made her motion picture acting debut in The Matchbreaker, directed by Caleb Vetter. The film was released in selected theaters in October 2016 and released digitally in December.

Grimmie received her only Teen Choice Award in 2016, winning posthumously for Choice Web Star: Music. It was her third such nomination. The televised ceremony caused backlash among her fans, who said her name was used to promote the show, but never mentioned during the broadcast despite the inclusion of a tribute to victims of gun violence. Her fans also called out the Emmys for excluding Grimmie from their memoriam.

On February 17, 2017, Grimmie's family released the posthumous single "Invisible". "Invisible" is part of Grimmie's EP Side B, which was released on April 21. Following the release of Side B, Grimmie's first posthumous album, All Is Vanity, was released on June 9. On May 11, 2018, Grimmie's family released another single, "Little Girl", which Grimmie wrote and recorded to support her mother, who was battling breast cancer. On September 15, 2020, Grimmie's family released her original song "Cry Wolf". In 2021, Grimmie's family released her original song "Back to Life", along with 3 remixes.

In 2019, her YouTube channel reached four million subscribers, although it dropped below four million in 2020, settling at 3.88 million as of October 2024.

In 2022, "Rule the World", completed as a duet with vocals by Ryan Brown, was released.

In 2026, the single "Eyes of Your Storm" was released along with a demo version.

== Artistry ==
Grimmie was a light-lyric soprano, with a range spanning three octaves and three notes. In 2014, while on The Voice, Usher called her a "baby Céline Dion". Graham Nash said, "I'm amazed at the range and the control and the depth of her voice. At 20 years old? That's insane." Shakira deemed her high register "out of this world".

Grimmie grew up listening to contemporary Christian artist Stacie Orrico: "She has a really awesome voice and I was so drawn to it. I think the reason I do have a soul voice is because I grew up listening to her and she was my huge, huge influence. I wanted to sound just like her, I wrote songs that kinda sounded like something she would do." Grimmie cited Christina Aguilera as her main influence vocally, and listed her favorite singers as Celine Dion, Whitney Houston, and Lady Gaga. Grimmie also said she admired Beyoncé for her vocals. Grimmie said she liked dubstep and DJ music, as well as rock 'n roll and heavy metal artists Metallica, Pantera, Iron Maiden, and Tool.

== Personal life and activism ==
Grimmie was a Christian. Her family attended Fellowship Alliance Chapel in Medford, New Jersey, before they moved to Los Angeles. Grimmie had cited her mother, Tina, a three-time breast cancer survivor, as a major inspiration for her musical career. Tina Grimmie died at the age of 59 on September 2, 2018, after a "courageous and brave battle with breast cancer".

Grimmie was an animal rights activist and participated in fundraising events for the Humane Society of the United States. The Christina Grimmie Animal Medical Fund was created in her honor, and she posthumously won the "Impact Award" from the industry for her animal rights activism. She also worked with PETA to promote pet adoption, after adopting a dog in 2014. In her honor, she received a leaf on PETA's Tree of Life, which honors heroes for animals. Grimmie was an anime fan, and had a Twitch channel where she frequently streamed.

== Murder ==
Murder of Christina Grimmie
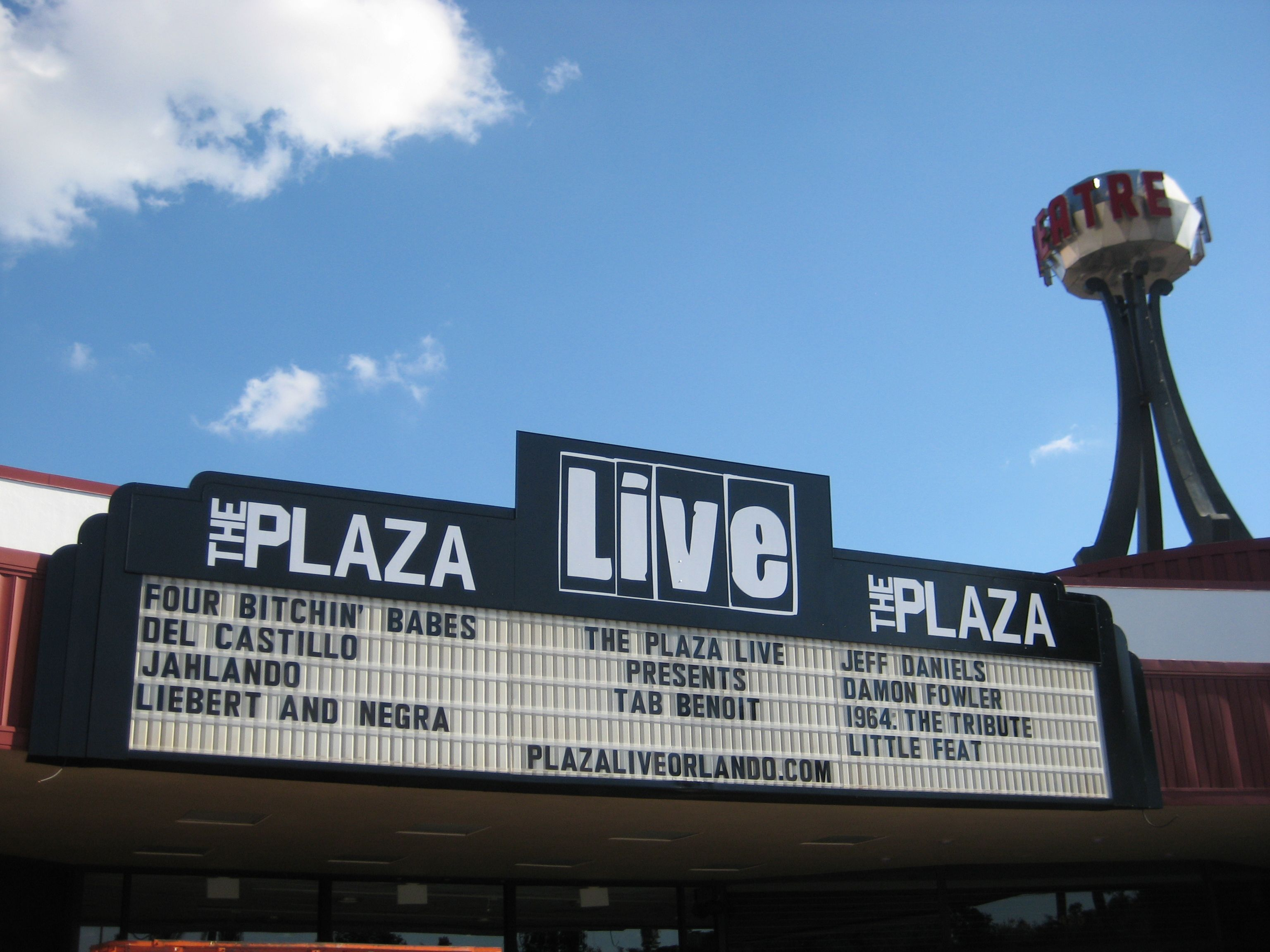
- The Plaza Live, where Grimmie was murdered
- Location: 28.5487°N 81.35125°W; The Plaza Live; Orlando, Florida
- Date: June 10, 2016; 10 years ago 10:24 p.m. (UTC-04:00)
- Target: Christina Victoria Grimmie
- Attack type: Murder–suicide, assassination
- Weapon: Glock 26 Gen 4 9mm pistol
- Deaths: 2 (Grimmie and the perpetrator)
- Perpetrator: Kevin James Loibl
- Motive: Obsession

On June 10, 2016, Grimmie performed with the band Before You Exit at the Plaza Live in Orlando, Florida. After her performance ended at 10:00 p.m. local time, Grimmie held a meet-and-greet with her fans inside the venue. Fans were lined up as Grimmie signed autographs and took selfies with them. At 10:24 p.m., 27-year-old Kevin James Loibl, who was in line, approached Grimmie when it was his turn. She opened her arms to hug him.

Loibl then pulled out a Glock pistol and shot her three times at point-blank range. Grimmie's brother, who was selling merchandise at a nearby table, jumped towards and tackled Loibl, and the men scuffled; Loibl broke free, backed against a wall, pulled out another pistol and shot himself in the head. He was pronounced dead at the scene. (Note: Police later called Marcus Grimmie "heroic" and said his actions "could have prevented [additional] loss of life there".)

Grimmie was on the floor bleeding from the back of her head, with a weak pulse. After CPR was performed on her by an attending physician, she was taken to the Orlando Regional Medical Center in critical condition; (Note: "Christina suffered a gunshot wound to the side of her head. ... This wound was fatal. Christina also suffered three gunshot wounds to her torso.") by 10:59 p.m., she was pronounced dead. An autopsy performed the following day concluded that Grimmie had been shot once in the head and twice in the chest.

The Orlando Police Department said Loibl had traveled by taxi to Orlando from his home in St. Petersburg, Florida, bringing two handguns, two extra magazines full of ammunition, and a large hunting knife. (Note: The second handgun was found on the floor at the venue; the head of security told police that a misfeed had kept it from firing. Whether Loibl had attempted to use it during the crime was not stated.) Orlando police chief John Mina stated that "The suspect traveled to Orlando apparently to commit this crime and then had plans to travel back to where he came from." According to Orlando police, the bags of the attendees would normally have been checked, but there were no metal detectors at the venue, nor were the attendees frisked.

One witness complained that the security was concerned about food and beverages being brought into the theater, but did not catch Loibl's guns. Witnesses described Loibl as "nervous" and "kinda creepy".

Loibl had purchased the guns legally from two different stores in St. Petersburg. He did not have an arrest record in his home county of Pinellas, but did have previous run-ins with the police. He did not appear to know Grimmie personally, nor did Grimmie know him. He had not had any diagnosis of any mental illnesses, but had a history of violence. Loibl worked as a part-time Best Buy customer service or warehouse worker/technician.

Police did not offer a motive, (Note: Loibl's phone was encrypted and the hard drive from his computer had been destroyed.) but said that Loibl had shown an "unhealthy and unrealistic infatuation" with the singer and tried to make himself more physically attractive to her through weight loss, hair transplants, teeth whitening and eye surgery. The Orlando Sentinel described his motive as "If I can't have you, then nobody else can – and I'm going to possess you by taking your life."

Loibl reportedly lived "like a hermit". His family said that they were not aware of his plans to travel to Orlando or that he possessed any guns. They also stated that they had never heard of Grimmie, heard Loibl talk about her, nor watched The Voice. However, his "only friend in the world" claimed to have known about Loibl's obsession, though not its extent; Loibl's co-workers stated the same. They said Loibl would be "angry and defensive" when questioned about his obsession with Grimmie and before the shooting he had stated he was "tired and ready to ascend".

On June 16, Grimmie was buried at Berlin Cemetery in a private ceremony. Her former coach from The Voice, Adam Levine, contributed to funeral costs. The following day, thousands of friends and fans attended a public memorial held in Medford, New Jersey.

=== Aftermath and reactions ===
Dozens of artists and other celebrities took to social media in response to Grimmie's death. The Voice tweeted, "There are no words. We lost a beautiful soul with an amazing voice". (Note: On June 28, The Voice released the video "With Love: A Tribute to Christina Grimmie", featuring reminiscences from fellow contestants including Will Champlin, Delvin Choice, Jacquie Lee and Kat Perkins.)

On June 23, Billboard magazine published an open letter advocating gun control, addressed to the United States Congress, demanding that universal background checks become federal law, referring to Grimmie's death and also the Pulse nightclub shooting, which occurred in Orlando less than 30 hours after Grimmie's death and killed 49. The petition carried nearly 200 signatures of famous musicians and music industry executives. Selena Gomez was a prominent signee of the document.

On August 21, NBC broadcast a post-Olympics preview episode of The Voice dedicated "in loving memory of our friend Christina Grimmie." Her former coach, Adam Levine, wrote that he and his wife were "absolutely devastated and heartbroken ... This is yet another senseless act of extreme violence." Blake Shelton wrote "I'm stunned and disgusted and heartbroken that we lost that sweet little girl." Longtime friend and former tour-mate Selena Gomez was performing only a few miles away from Grimmie at the Amway Center at the time of the murder. The following morning she wrote, "My heart is absolutely broken. I miss you, Christina." Gomez also tearfully dedicated her performance of Hillsong's "Transfiguration" to Grimmie's memory at her Miami concert the following night on June 11, and then canceled a meet-and-greet scheduled to take place that night, citing fear and grief. Gomez later checked into rehab and put her tour on hold.

Many others dedicated performances to Grimmie, such as Justin Bieber, Ariana Grande, Sabrina Carpenter, Demi Lovato, Maroon 5, Twenty One Pilots, Charlie Puth, and Rachel Platten. Dove Cameron, who had previously collaborated with Grimmie, expressed her grief over the course of a few days on Twitter. Before You Exit, with whom Grimmie had performed before her murder, tweeted, "Today we lost an angel, sister, and a beloved friend."

Loibl’s family left a handwritten note on their doorstep offering their condolences and apologies for their son's actions, with "no other comments". Susan Wojcicki, the CEO of YouTube, paid tribute by saying the YouTube family was "heartbroken" and "shocked" to hear of Grimmie's murder, with YouTube officially paying tribute on their website.

Many YouTubers made tribute videos for Grimmie. On June 17, a montage of clips featuring Grimmie titled "In Loving Memory Of Christina Grimmie" was posted on her official YouTube channel, which gained upwards of 2.5 million views and 33,000 comments in the first four days. Songs written and recorded in Grimmie's memory include Tyler Ward's "A Song for Christina", Before You Exit's "Clouds", MAX's "Christina's Song", "Somebody's Angel" by Jacquie Lee, and "Blink of an Eye" by Tori Kelly. In Season 11 of The Voice, the coaches performed "Dream On" at the start of the show, as a tribute to Grimmie. In Season 12, Team Adam performed "Hey Jude" as another tribute to Grimmie; her family was in the audience.

On June 11, a GoFundMe was created by Grimmie's manager to cover funeral costs and expenses for the Grimmie family, raising over $170,000 in two days and surpassing its goal of $4,000. It received over 25,000 shares through social media. Soon after, Adam Levine offered to pay for all expenses. (Note: Levine paid for Grimmie's funeral.) A petition was also created on change.org to honor Grimmie, a fan of the video game series The Legend of Zelda, by naming a non-playable character after her in the upcoming Legend of Zelda game set to be released the following year. It was signed by over 70,000 people, including her brother Marcus, though nothing ever came of it.

Grimmie was scheduled to appear at E3 2016. The president of Nintendo of America, Reggie Fils-Aimé, gave his condolences to Grimmie and the victims of the Orlando nightclub shooting before giving his Nintendo E3 2016 speech on announcing The Legend of Zelda: Breath of the Wild.

Grimmie's death led to calls for increased security at performing arts venues, and created a discussion about gun control and mental health. American heavy metal band Pantera, noting the similarities between Grimmie's murder and the deaths of former Pantera guitarist Darrell Abbott and three others in 2004, urged concert promoters and club owners to impose stronger measures to protect artists from "gun-wielding fanatics", adding: "Sadly, that's not the case and another rising star had to pay the consequences with her life."

The Plaza Live reopened four days after the shooting, paying tribute to Grimmie. Management asked Orlando police to help evaluate the club's security. Some singers in Las Vegas—including Cali Tucker, another season six contestant on The Voice—were given escorts after their performances. In California, VidCon added metal detectors and security officers, and banned informal meet-and-greets in the wake of Grimmie's murder. (Note: Grimmie had been a featured performer at VidCon, and its June 2016 event in Anaheim featured a video tribute to her, after which event hosts John and Hank Green tearfully asked the audience for a round of applause for Grimmie.) Video personalities including Joey Graceffa were assigned private security. An industry attorney said the extra measures are "expensive, and fans don't like it. But this is the new reality."

In February 2017, Grimmie's family announced their plans to create a foundation in her honor named "The Christina Grimmie Foundation". (Note: The Christina Grimmie Foundation was officially launched in April.) The foundation's purpose is to support those affected by gun violence and/or breast cancer. The foundation frequently hosts events in Grimmie's honor, to ensure that Grimmie's death is "not the end of her story". Later that month, an episode of 48 Hours titled "Stalked" aired, focusing on Grimmie's murder.

On the second anniversary of Grimmie's murder, the city of Orlando paid tribute, as did the police force. That same month, a podcast titled Christina Grimmie: The Murder of a Rising Star was released, with separate episodes all focusing on key components of her murder. After the Jacksonville Landing shooting occurred in August 2018, BBC News compared Grimmie's murder with it, along with other shootings that had occurred in Florida.

Grimmie's death was the inspiration for the 2022 song "Glimpse of Us", co-written by her close friends Connor and Riley McDonough of Before You Exit (along with Alexis Kesselman and Castle) and released by Japanese-Australian singer-songwriter Joji, who formerly went by the YouTube moniker Filthy Frank. The song was originally created as a voice memo by Riley McDonough in 2019 to cope with Grimmie's death, as during recording he "[called] out to God, [asking], 'If I could only catch a glimpse of you'." It was released as a single on June 10, 2022, and peaked at #8 on the Billboard Hot 100.

=== Lawsuit ===
In December 2016, six months after her murder, Grimmie's family filed a wrongful-death lawsuit in Florida circuit court against several entities, including the concert promoter, the foundation that owns the venue, and the security company working the event. In January 2017, the promoter and the owner of the venue requested that the judge dismiss the lawsuit, claiming Florida law does not allow business owners to be held liable for attacks on their property. A hearing on the motion to dismiss the lawsuit was set for May 23. The lawsuit was dismissed but Grimmie's family was given an opportunity to re-file the suit. The judge stated that the suit did not make enough of a distinction between the concert promoter and the venue owner.

In May 2017, the family's attorney, Brian Caplan, said that Grimmie's family would file a new complaint after a Florida judge dismissed the original lawsuit.

On April 9, 2018, just short of a year after the Grimmie family filed a new complaint in a Florida court, it was revealed that a judge rejected the defendants' AEG Live and the Orlando Philharmonic Orchestra Plaza Foundation motions to dismiss the case, and allowed the family's lawsuit to move forward. In their lawsuit, the Grimmie family alleged that the defendants had "failed to take adequate security measures to ensure the safety of the performers and the attendees at the concert venue." Grimmie's family was also allowed to move forward on claims of "negligent infliction of emotional distress". The judge determined more research on the claims would be needed before going forward. According to court records, on December 3, 2019, Grimmie's family voluntarily dismissed the case.

== Filmography ==
=== Television ===
Year	Title	Role	Notes	Ref.
2011	So Random!	Herself	Guest Performer	
2012	Power Up	Herself	Host	
2012	Remixed	Herself		
2012–2014	Dancing with the Stars	Herself	Musical Guest	
2014	TakePart Live	Herself	Guest	
2014	The Voice	Herself	Contestant/Performer	
2014	2014 Orange Bowl	Herself	Performed the National Anthem	
2015	Drama King	Herself	Guest	
2015	Teens Wanna Know	Herself		
2015	VIP for a Day	Herself		

=== Film ===
Year	Film	Role	Notes	Ref.
2016	The Matchbreaker	Emily Atkins	Independent film, first and only film role, posthumous release	
2026	Christina Grimmie – Her Voice and Legacy: A Decade Later	Herself	Documentary film (archival footage), posthumous release	

== Discography ==
=== Studio albums ===
List of studio albums, with peak chart positions
Title	Album details	Peak chart positions		
Title	Album details	US	US Indie	BEL (FL)
With Love	Released: August 6, 2013; Label: Maker Music; Formats: CD, digital download	101	20	167
All Is Vanity	Released: June 9, 2017; Label: UMG, Republic; Formats: CD, Vinyl, digital download	—	—	—

=== Compilation albums ===
List of compilation albums
Title	Album details	Peak chart positions
Title	Album details	US
The Complete Season 6 Collection (The Voice Performance)	Released: May 20, 2014; Label: UMG, Republic; Format: Digital download	192
The Matchbreaker (Original Motion Picture Soundtrack)	Released: November 29, 2016; Label: So Broken Up; Formats: CD, digital download	—
The Legacy Collection	Released: July 17, 2026; Label: ZXL Music Inc.; Format: Digital download	—

=== EPs ===
List of EPs, with peak chart positions
Title	Album details	Peak chart positions		
Title	Album details	US	US Indie	CAN
Find Me	Released: June 14, 2011; Label: Independent; Formats: CD, digital download	35	6	44
Side A	Released: February 21, 2016; Label: LH7 Management; Formats: CD, digital download	171	11	—
Side B	Released: April 21, 2017; Label: UMG, Republic; Formats: CD, digital download	—	—	—

=== Singles ===
List of singles, with peak chart positions
Single	Year	Peak chart positions			Album
Single	Year	US	US Heat	CAN	Album
"Advice"	2011	—	—	—	Find Me
"Liar Liar"	2011	—	15	—	Find Me
"Tell My Mama"	2013	—	—	—	With Love
"Feelin' Good"	2014	—	—	—	With Love
"Wrecking Ball (The Voice Performance)"	2014	—	—	—	The Complete Season 6 Collection (The Voice Performance)
"I Knew You Were Trouble (The Voice Performance)"	2014	—	—	—	The Complete Season 6 Collection (The Voice Performance)
"Counting Stars (The Voice Performance)"	2014	—	—	—	The Complete Season 6 Collection (The Voice Performance)
"I Won't Give Up (The Voice Performance)"	2014	—	—	—	The Complete Season 6 Collection (The Voice Performance)
"Dark Horse (The Voice Performance)"	2014	—	—	—	The Complete Season 6 Collection (The Voice Performance)
"Hold On, We're Going Home (The Voice Performance)"	2014	74	6	64	The Complete Season 6 Collection (The Voice Performance)
"How to Love (The Voice Performance)"	2014	79	7	79	The Complete Season 6 Collection (The Voice Performance)
"Hide and Seek (The Voice Performance)"	2014	—	—	—	The Complete Season 6 Collection (The Voice Performance)
"Some Nights (The Voice Performance)"	2014	—	—	—	The Complete Season 6 Collection (The Voice Performance)
"Can't Help Falling in Love (The Voice Performance)"	2014	74	4	68	The Complete Season 6 Collection (The Voice Performance)
"Somebody That I Used to Know (The Voice Performance)" (Grimmie and Adam Levine)	2014	66	—	47	The Complete Season 6 Collection (The Voice Performance)
"Must Be Love"	2014	—	—	—	Non-album singles
"Cliché"	2015	—	—	—	Non-album singles
"Stay with Me" (Diamond Eyes and Grimmie)	2015	—	—	—	Non-album singles
"Shrug"	2015	—	—	—	Non-album singles
"Love Song to the Earth" (Paul McCartney, Jon Bon Jovi, Sheryl Crow, Fergie, Colbie Caillat, Natasha Bedingfield, Leona Lewis, Sean Paul, Johnny Rzeznik, Krewella, Angélique Kidjo, Kelsea Ballerini, Nicole Scherzinger, Grimmie, Victoria Justice and Q'orianka Kilcher)	2015	—	—	—	Non-album singles
"Invisible"	2017	—	—	—	Side B and All Is Vanity
"Sublime"	2017	—	—	—	All Is Vanity
"Little Girl"	2018	—	—	—	Non-album singles
"Hold Your Head Up"	2019	—	—	—	Non-album singles
"Cry Wolf"	2020	—	—	—	Non-album singles
"Back To Life"	2021	—	—	—	Non-album singles
"Rule the World" (Grimmie and Ryan Brown)	2022	—	—	—	Non-album singles
"Eyes Of Your Storm"	2026	—	—	—	Non-album singles
"—" denotes items which did not chart.

=== Music videos ===
Year	Title	Director
2011	"Advice"	Sean Babas
2013	"Tell My Mama"	David Turvey
2014	"Feelin' Good"	
2015	"What a Girl Is"	Layne Pavoggi
2016	"Snow White"	King Hollis
2016	"Anybody's You"	King Hollis
2016	"Deception"	King Hollis
2016	"Without Him"	King Hollis
2016	"My Buddy"	
2017	"Invisible"	Stephen Leonard
2018	"Little Girl"	
2019	"Hold Your Head Up"	Caleb Vetter
2020	"Cry Wolf"	—N/a
2026	"Eyes Of Your Storm"	—N/a

== Awards and nominations ==
Year	Award	Category	Outcome
2011	American Music Awards	New Media Honoree (Female)	Won
2011	Youth Rock Awards	Rockin' Indie Artist of the Year	Won
2012	Intense Radio's Music Awards	Best Female Cover Artist	Won
2013	Radio Disney Music Awards	Breakout Artist of the Year	Nominated
2014	Young Hollywood Awards	Viral Superstar	Nominated
2014	Teen Choice Awards	Choice Web Star: Music	Nominated
2015	Teen Choice Awards	Choice Web Star: Music	Nominated
2015	Shorty Awards	Best YouTube Musician	Nominated
2015	iHeartRadio Music Festival	Macy's iHeartRadio Rising Star	Won
2016	Teen Choice Awards	Choice Web Star: Music	Won
2017	Humane Society (HSUS)	Impact Award	Won

== Concert tours ==
=== Opening acts ===
- Selena Gomez & the Scene – A Year Without Rain Tour (2010–2011)
- DigiTour – Lancaster PA, Washington D.C., New York NY (2011)
- Selena Gomez & the Scene – We Own the Night Tour (2011)
- Selena Gomez – Stars Dance Tour (2013)
- IHeartRadio Music Festival – Las Vegas, NV (2015)
- Rachel Platten – The Wildfire Tour (2016)
- Before You Exit – All The Lights Tour (2016)

=== Public tours ===
- The Voice – Summer Tour (2014)
- Before You Exit – January and February UK/Europe Tour (2015)

== See also ==
- Murder of John Lennon – 1980 murder in New York City, US
- Murder of Dimebag Darrell – 2004 mass shooting in Columbus, Ohio, United States
- Murder of Rebecca Schaeffer – 1989 murder in Los Angeles, California
- Murder of Selena – 1995 murder in Corpus Christi, Texas, US
- Ricardo López (attempted to murder Björk)
- Pulse nightclub shooting Happened two days after her death
