= Bad Ideas (album) =

Studio album by Tessa Violet
- Released: October 25, 2019
- Genre: Pop • Hip-pop
- Length: 32:35
- Label: T∆G Music
- Producer: Seth Earnest

Tessa Violet chronology
Halloway (2016)	Bad Ideas (2019)	My God! (2023)

Singles from Bad Ideas
- 1. "Crush" Released: June 15, 2018; 2. "Bad Ideas" Released: November 30, 2018; 3. "I Like (the idea of) You" Released: May 2, 2019; 4. "Games" Released: September 27, 2019; 5. "Words Ain't Enough" Released: October 24, 2019; 6. "Bored" Released: May 19, 2020

Bad Ideas is the second studio album by American singer-songwriter Tessa Violet, released on October 25, 2019, by T∆G Music. The album was originally set to be released on August 3, 2018, but was delayed indefinitely until the official announcement on October 4, 2019, with the tracklist announced three days later. Bad Ideas was preceded by the singles "Crush", "Bad Ideas", "I Like (the idea of) You", "Games", and "Words Ain't Enough"; additional single "Bored" followed in 2020. The album was produced by Seth Earnest, who has collaborated with Violet since 2013.

== Production ==
Tessa Violet admitted she went through a breakup during the writing of the album. Violet said that the album "is a reflection of that snapshot of my life and reconciling ‘why do I keep doing things that make my life worse when I know they make my life worse?'" Violet wrote all of the songs in her bedroom, aside from "Crush".

Production for Bad Ideas began in late spring 2017 while Tessa Violet was an independent artist. Violet said the album did not coalesce until she brought the title track to her producer.

Her record label originally planned to release three separate Bad Ideas EPs. However, Violet was reluctant with the plan saying, "Man, I didn't really write three EPs though, I wrote an album and I think it should be experienced together." Nevertheless, Bad Ideas (Act One) was released on July 26, 2019, though no other EPs followed. The EP featured the singles "Crush", "Bad Ideas", and "I Like (the idea of) You" as well as remixes of the songs, and was released on vinyl and digital downloads. A version featuring only the remixes was released digitally on the same day.

== Promotion ==
She promoted the album with the 'I Like (the idea of) Tour' Tour, which took place across venues in Europe and the United States throughout 2019. The tour featured Leadley, Chloe Lilac, daysormay, Upsahl, and MisterWives as opening acts for various dates. Violet further promoted the album in 2019 through performances at Lollapalooza and opening acts for AJR, Coin, and Orla Gartland. Violet performed live acoustic versions of Bad Ideas for WGBH-TV in Boston.

On 1 February 2025, The UK YouTube channel, Techmoan, featured an MP3-to-cassette adapter device called "Mixxtape" by Paulthings. Prominently featured as one of the preloaded recordings supplied by the manufacturer are tracks and album art from "Bad Ideas."

== Reception ==
Monocle said "there is something fascinating about pop that achieves a lot with very little. Tessa Violet's secret is in almost minimal but enthralling background beats."

== Track listing ==
All tracks are written by Tessa Violet.

No.	Title	Length
1.	"Prelude"	1:03
2.	"Crush"	3:35
3.	"Bad Ideas"	2:59
4.	"I Like (the idea of) You"	2:49
5.	"Games"	3:41
6.	"Feelin"	3:04
7.	"Words Ain't Enough"	2:04
8.	"Bored"	3:03
9.	"Wishful Drinking"	3:15
10.	"Honest"	4:12
11.	"Interlude III"	2:49
Total length:		32:35

Bad Ideas (Act One)
No.	Title	Length
1.	"Crush"	3:36
2.	"Bad Ideas"	2:59
3.	"I Like (the idea of) You"	2:48
4.	"Crush" (Le Youth Remix)	5:06
5.	"Bad Ideas" (Lo-fi)	3:16
6.	"I Like (the idea of) You" (Viceroy Remix)	3:40
Total length:		21:26

Bad Ideas - THE REMIXES
No.	Title	Length
1.	"Crush" (Le Youth Remix)	5:06
2.	"Bad Ideas" (Lo-fi)	3:16
3.	"I Like (the idea of) You" (Viceroy Remix)	3:40
Total length:		12:02

== Charts ==
Chart	Peak position
US Heatseekers Albums (Billboard)	19
US Independent Albums (Billboard)	48
