= Daysormay =

Canadian alternative rock band

- Origin: Vernon, British Columbia
- Genres: Alternative rock; pop; indie pop; pop rock; indie rock
- Years active: 2014–present
- Label: T∆G Music
- Members: Aidan Andrews; Carson Bassett; Nolan Bassett
- Past members: Eli Garlick; Craig Matterson
- Website: daysormay.com

Daysormay (stylized as daysormay) is a Canadian alternative band based in Vancouver, British Columbia. The band was formed in 2010 in Vernon, British Columbia by Aidan Andrews, twins Nolan and Carson Bassett, Eli Garlick, and Craig Matterson. Garlick and Matterson left the group in 2019. They are best known from their collaborations with Tessa Violet, as well as opening for Cold War Kids, Tessa Violet, Peach Pit, Walk off the Earth, and Arkells. In 2014, they independently released their first album, Lee, and later an EP, Talk Peace to a Wolf (2016). Daysormay then signed with The Artist Group label (T∆G Music) in 2019 and released their second album, Just Existing (2021).

== History ==
=== 2010-2018: Lee and Talk Peace to a Wolf ===
Growing up in Vernon, British Columbia, Aidan Andrews and the Bassett brothers met on a ski trip when they were around 7 years old. Their parents were mutual friends, and they became friends as well. The first version of the group was created when the band members were about 10–11 years old, and started playing music covers together.

On May 3, 2016, Daysormay released "Radikal", the lead single from their EP, Talk Peace to a Wolf, which released on May 3, 2016. That same month, the group was rewarded by Telus Storyhive, who gave them $10,000 to make a music video for their album. Joseph Pinheiro said the money would be used to make the music video for the single "Human". As of July 2023, the music video for "Human" has not been released on YouTube and it is unclear whether or not it has been made.

=== 2018-2024: Just Existing ===
In February 2019, when Tessa Violet was on tour with COIN, she had the opportunity to play two headlining shows in Chicago and Portland, and needed an opening act for these shows. She asked her fans on social media to send group suggestions, and Daysormay ended up being one of those suggestions. Violet said that they were her favorite suggestion, and that she loves "Role Model", but unfortunately the group were too far from Portland to be able to open for her. However, Daysormay were able to open for part of Tessa Violet's 'I Like (The Idea Of) Tour' tour in August 2019. During the tour, the band offered to create a version of "Role Model" featuring Violet, which she readily accepted. During the COVID-19 pandemic, Tessa Violet became an A&R consultant for T∆G Music, and was able to sign them. The version of "Role Model" featuring Violet was released on May 27, 2020.

Following their newfound popularity from their collaboration with Tessa Violet, Daysormay released another single, "Running" on August 14. A music video for the song was released 6 days later on August 20.

This was followed by their next single, "Holding my Tongue." In an interview, Andrews revealed that the song, released in support of the 2020 Black Lives Matter protests following the murder of George Floyd, had actually been in the works for six years. Andrews reportedly began writing the song in 2014, after watching a video of the murder of Eric Garner.

On February 5, 2021, Daysormay released the single "Everything is Changing", followed by a music video shot in Vernon, the band's hometown. On April 23, a video was uploaded to Daysormay's YouTube channel, announcing another new single titled "The Trend". A music video for the single was released on April 29.

On May 26, the band released the song "Ego". According to Andrews, "Ego" started as a songwriting exercise, to see if he could write a song from the perspective of several different characters, and try to detach as much as possible from his own perspective.

In May 2021, the band revealed that rather than an EP, which they had mentioned in several interviews in 2020, they would be releasing their label debut album, Just Existing, on October 6, 2021. This announcement confirmed that "Running", "Holding My Tongue", "Everything is Changing", "The Trend" and "Ego" would all appear on the album. It was later confirmed that "Role Model" ft. Tessa Violet would also appear on the album.

The final single prior to the album's released was the title track, "Just Existing", on August 3.

Just Existing was released on October 6 and includes new tracks “25”, “Satellite” and “Thank you and good night”.

In November 2023, daysormay were featured heavily on the single "Make You Understand" by Chin Injeti. The track was produced by daysormay, alongside Injeti and Eli Garlick. The band sampled a TikTok video of Injeti singing and playing the song's chorus on guitar, over which they wrote the verses and bridge of the song. It was released on Injeti's album "VESSELS, Vol. 3" on November 2, 2023.

=== 2024-present: MODERATION ===
In September 2024, daysormay released their second studio album, MODERATION. It was preceded by 3 singles: "SIMMER", "IN BUT NOT OF" and "UV". The album features several new songs: "MOD ERA", "BUZZING" (feat. Jayacara), "5.5.22", "AUTO", "EVERYBODY", "FORWARDISM" and "ALL I HAVE".

== Members ==
=== Current members ===
- Aidan Andrews – vocals, guitar, keyboards, ukulele
- Carson Bassett – drums, percussion, programming
- Nolan Bassett – bass, backing vocals, trumpet

=== Former members ===
- Eli Garlick – guitar, violin, backing vocals (2014–2019)
- Craig Matterson – piano, backing vocals (2014–2019)

== Discography ==
=== Studio albums ===
Title	Details
Just Existing	Released: October 6, 2021; Label: T∆G Music; Format: Digital download, streaming
Moderation	Released: September 18, 2024; Label: Daysormay Music Ltd.; Format: Digital download, streaming

=== Extended plays ===
Title	Details
Talk Peace to a Wolf	Released: May 3, 2016; Label: Independent; Format: Digital download

=== Singles ===
==== As main artist ====
Title	Year	Album
"Radikal"	2015	Talk Peace to a Wolf
"Role Model" (solo or featuring Tessa Violet)	2018	Just Existing
"Running"	2020	Just Existing
"Holding My Tongue"	2020	Just Existing
"Everything Is Changing"	2021	Just Existing
"The Trend"	2021	Just Existing
"Ego"	2021	Just Existing
"Just Existing"	2021	Just Existing
"Simmer"	2024	Moderation
"In But Not Of"	2024	Moderation
"UV"	2024	Moderation
"Everybody"	2025	Moderation
"Streetfight"	2026	Non-album singles
"Deleter"	2026	Non-album singles

==== As featured artist ====
Title	Year	Album
"I Put a Spell on You" (Small Town Artillery ft. daysormay)	2019	Non-album single
"Make You Understand" (Chin Injeti ft. daysormay)	2023	Vessels, Vol. 3

=== Music videos ===
Title	Year	Director
Radikal	2016	daysormay
Darkerside	2016	daysormay
Desolation Sound	2018	febnuki
Role Model	2018	febnuki
Role Model ft. Tessa Violet	2020	Christian Lai
Running	2020	Torin Andrews, Aidan Andrews
Holding My Tongue	2020	febnuki
Holding My Tongue (Live)	2020	febnuki
Everything Is Changing	2021	Christian Lai and Titouan Fournier
The Trend	2021	febnuki
Ego	2021	febnuki, Christian Lai, and Titouan Fournier
Just Existing	2021	Titouan Fournier
25	2021	daysormay
Thank You, and Goodnight (Demo Version	2022	febnuki
Make You Understand	2023	febnuki
SIMMER (Visualizer)	2024	Penny Chan, Aidan Andrews
