= Side B (EP) =

EP by Christina Grimmie
- Released: April 21, 2017
- Recorded: 2016
- Genre: Pop; electropop
- Length: 13:29
- Label: UMG; Republic Records; ZXL Music, Inc.
- Producer: Stephen Rezza; Steve Solomon

Christina Grimmie chronology
Side A (2016)	Side B (2017)	All Is Vanity (2017)

Singles from Side B
- 1. "Invisible" Released: February 17, 2017

Side B is the third and final EP by American singer and songwriter Christina Grimmie. It was released posthumously on April 21, 2017, through Republic Records and Universal Music Group.

Grimmie's family had scheduled to release her first single "Invisible" on February 14, 2017. The release was pushed back to February 17, 2017, when Christina's family announced they signed with Republic Records to release her music. On the day of the release of "Invisible", Grimmie's family and producer confirmed that they will be releasing the third EP, Side B, as Christina also confirmed herself before her death on June 10, 2016.

== Singles ==
- "Invisible" serves as the EP's lead single, released on February 17, 2017. Upon its release, it debuted at number 25 on the Billboard Twitter Top Tracks chart in the US. The music video was released on March 10, 2017.

== Track listing ==
No.	Title	Writer(s)	Producer(s)	Length
1.	"I Only Miss You When I Breathe"	Christina Grimmie; Steve Solomon; Rinat Arinos	Steve Solomon	3:07
2.	"Invisible"	Grimmie; Mark Merthe; Natalie Hawkins; Stephen Rezza; Nathaniel Lamm Evans	Stephen Rezza	3:36
3.	"The Game"	Grimmie	Rezza	3:17
4.	"I Won't Give Up"	Jason Mraz; Michael Natter	Rezza	3:29
Total length:				13:29

Notes

- "I Won't Give Up" is a cover song, originally written, released & performed by Jason Mraz in 2012. Grimmie previously covered the song on her YouTube channel and then performed it on The Voice.

== Release history ==
Date	Format	Label(s)
April 21, 2017	CD; Digital download	UMG; Republic Records; ZXL Music, Inc.
