= All Is Vanity =

Studio album by Christina Grimmie
- Released: June 9, 2017
- Recorded: 2016
- Genre: Pop; electropop
- Length: 35:10
- Label: UMG; Republic Records; ZXL Music, Inc.
- Producer: Stephen Rezza; Steve Solomon

Christina Grimmie chronology
Side B (2017)	All Is Vanity (2017)

Singles from All Is Vanity
- 1. "Invisible" Released: February 17, 2017; 2. "Sublime" Released: June 10, 2017

All Is Vanity is the second and final studio album by American singer and songwriter Christina Grimmie. It was released posthumously on June 9, 2017, through Republic Records and Universal Music Group. On the day of the release of Side B, the Grimmie family announced that they would release All Is Vanity.

The album was originally scheduled to be released on June 2, 2017, on National Gun Violence Awareness Day, but was then postponed to June 9, 2017, a day before the first anniversary of Grimmie's murder.

According to Billboard, the Grimmie family revealed that the songs on Side B would be featured on the album.

== Singles ==
- "Invisible" serves as the album's lead single, released on February 17, 2017. Upon its release, it debuted at number 25 on the Billboard Twitter Top Tracks chart in the US. The music video was released on March 10, 2017.
- "Sublime" is the second single from the album, released on the first anniversary of Grimmie's death.

== Track listing ==
All tracks produced by Stephen Rezza, except "I Only Miss You When I Breathe" produced by Steve Solomon.

No.	Title	Writer(s)	Length
1.	"Sublime"	Christina Grimmie; Nathaniel Evans; Mark Merthe; Stephen Rezza; Natalie Hawkins	3:19
2.	"Steady Love"	Grimmie; Evans; Merthe; Rezza; Hawkins	3:52
3.	"Invisible"	Grimmie; Evans; Merthe; Rezza; Hawkins	3:36
4.	"Crowded Room"	Grimmie; Phil Bentley; Rune Westberg	4:30
5.	"Everybody Lies"	Grimmie; Evans; Merthe	3:23
6.	"Pressure"	Grimmie; Evans; Merthe	3:29
7.	"Maybe I"	Grimmie; Evans; Merthe	3:16
8.	"Echo"	Grimmie; Evans; Brandon Sammons	3:30
9.	"I Only Miss You When I Breathe"	Grimmie; Steve Solomon; Rinat Arinos	3:05
10.	"The Game"	Grimmie	3:15
Total length:			35:10

== Credits ==
- Christina Grimmie – lead vocals, performer, composer
- Stephen Rezza – production, composer
- Steve Solomon – production, composer
- Joel Wanasek – mastering
- Neal Avron – mixing
- Seth Munson – mixing
- Yoni Goldberg – photography
- Steven Rachwal – design

== Release history ==
Country	Release date	Format	Label	Ref.
United States	June 9, 2017	CD; Digital download	UMG; Republic Records; ZXL Music, Inc.	
