= Bill Butler (cinematographer) =

American cinematographer (1921–2023)

Bill Butler ASC
- Publicity Photo of Bill Butler
- Born: Wilmer Cable Butler; April 7, 1921; Cripple Creek, Colorado, U.S.
- Died: April 5, 2023 (aged 101); Los Angeles, California, U.S.
- Education: University of Iowa
- Occupation: Cinematographer
- Years active: 1967–2016
- Spouses: Alma H. Smith (m. 1943; div. 1983); Iris Butler (m. 1984)
- Children: 5
- Awards: See below

Wilmer Cable Butler, ASC (April 7, 1921 – April 5, 2023) was an American cinematographer, known for his contributions to the New Hollywood movement. He had notable collaborations with directors Francis Ford Coppola, Steven Spielberg, William Friedkin, and Ivan Reitman. His most notable films included The Conversation (1974), Jaws (1975), Grease (1978), and three Rocky sequels.

He was nominated for an Academy Award and a BAFTA Award for his work on One Flew Over the Cuckoo's Nest (1975), which he completed after original cinematographer Haskell Wexler was fired from the production. He was also a two-time Primetime Emmy Award winner.

== Early life and education ==
Wilmer Cable Butler was born on April 7, 1921, in Cripple Creek, Colorado. Butler spent the first five years of his life living in a log cabin on a homestead in Colorado, where his parents were farmers. He moved with his parents to Henry County when he was 5 years old and raised in Mount Pleasant, Iowa, a small college town. He graduated from Mount Pleasant High School in 1940.

During World War II, Butler served in the U.S. Army Signal Corps, working as a signal caller due to his background with high frequency electronics. However, he was discharged when an untreated hernia was discovered. Butler then graduated with a degree in engineering from the University of Iowa.

== Early career ==
Butler began his career as an engineer at a radio station in Gary, Indiana. He subsequently moved to Chicago, where he helped design and build the first television stations at the ABC affiliate and later at WGN-TV. When WGN went on the air, Butler operated a live video camera for commercials and for locally produced programs. At his tenure with WGN, Butler met William Friedkin.

Friedkin asked Butler to be his cinematographer on The People vs. Paul Crump, a documentary that focused on a prisoner who was slated for execution in Illinois. It was a docudrama that resulted in the governor of Illinois commuting the prisoner's death sentence. "I was very successful in television, so I had no reason to go into film," Butler said. "But I knew Bill Friedkin was interested in making a film documentary, and he needed a cinematographer. He asked me to assist him. And I did." As a result, Butler's interest shifted from live television to film documentaries. In a 2005 interview, Butler credited Friedkin with giving him his first actual job in the film industry.

== Cinematography ==
Butler earned his first narrative credit in Chicago in 1967 for Fearless Frank, a low-budget feature directed by Philip Kaufman. Two years later, Butler shot The Rain People (1969) for Francis Ford Coppola, who was introduced to him by Friedkin. Butler moved to Los Angeles in 1970.

"I did some work with director Phil Kaufman on the Universal Studios lot as a writer while I was still trying to get into the Los Angeles camera guild," Butler recalled. "That's when I met Steven Spielberg." Butler would then take charge of cinematography for two of Spielberg's earliest films, Something Evil (1972) and Savage (1973). That same year, he shot second unit and additional footage for Coppola's The Godfather and Deliverance.

Other films which Butler served as the director of photography include The Bingo Long Traveling All-Stars & Motor Kings (1976), Grease (1978) and installments two, three, and four of Rocky. Butler was also the cinematographer for Demon Seed (1977), as well as Capricorn One (1977),Stripes (1981), Biloxi Blues (1988), Child's Play (1988), Graffiti Bridge (1990), Flipper (1996), Anaconda (1997) and Deceiver (1997). His television credits include The Execution of Private Slovik (1974), Raid on Entebbe (1977), and The Thorn Birds (1983).

Butler was scheduled to have made his directorial debut in January 1979 with Adrift & Beyond, but it never came to fruition. Butler turned down Coppola's offer to direct the photography for Apocalypse Now (1979). Butler has worked in films during the 2000s, such as Frailty (2002) and Funny Money (2006). Bill Paxton, the director of the former film, said, "I was excited when Bill Butler who was the cinematographer on such classic films as Jaws and The Conversation came aboard as my director of photography for Frailty. And I really picked his brain, always asking 'how did you do this shot?' and 'how did you figure that out?'" Bill Butler recounted his initial conversations with Paxton about the script: "I liked the direction he wanted to take, and he inspired me to share his vision. It was a great collaboration."

Butler is also notable for being a replacement to Haskell Wexler on two occasions: The Conversation (1974; also directed by Coppola) and One Flew Over the Cuckoo's Nest (1975). The latter earned him his first and only Academy Award nomination.

Butler was named KODAK Cinematographer in Residence at the University of Arizona (Department of Media Arts) in 2006.

=== Jaws ===
Butler had heard that Spielberg was preparing to shoot Jaws (1975), mainly on Martha's Vineyard in Massachusetts. "I said, 'I hear you're making a movie about a fish,'" Butler recalled. After they joked for a few minutes, Spielberg asked Butler if he was interested.

Butler's crew included Michael Chapman as camera operator. When they arrived on Martha's Vineyard, Butler showed Spielberg how he could brace a handheld Panaflex camera and take the roll out of the boat rocking on the waves with his knees instead of using a 400-lb gimbal. Spielberg embraced the idea. "About 90% of the shots on the boat were handheld," Butler says. "Michael was intrigued by the idea and was very good at it. We did things that we probably wouldn't have tried without the lightweight camera. Michael even climbed the mast and shot from the top straight down. We also put him in a small boat."

During the production of Jaws, Butler spent most of his time on the picture in the water with Spielberg. Butler created a special camera platform that worked with the water to accommodate both "below the water line" and "surface" shots quickly. To handle the longer surface shots the film required, Butler reconfigured the standard "water box" casing used to hold a camera in the water. He also is acknowledged for saving footage from a camera that sank into the ocean, having claimed sea water is similar to saline-based developing solutions. "We got on an airplane with the film in a bucket of water, took it to New York and developed it. We didn't lose a foot," said Butler.

Butler also created a pontoon camera raft with a waterproof housing that achieved those trademark water level shots that gave a point of view from the shark fin. To stop water drops hitting the lens, Butler used the Panavision Spray Deflector that saw an optical glass spin at high speed to deflect the drops except for the 4th of July beach stampede where the water-lens interface adds to the panic.

Butler originally envisioned the look of Jaws to start in bright, summer sunshine and then become more ominous as the shark hunt goes on. The first half remains a riot of vibrant primary colors. In filming Amity, Butler was inspired by the work of painters such as Edward Hopper and Andrew Wyeth in their view of the United States untainted by urban life.

After the ASC honored him with its Lifetime Achievement Award, Spielberg wrote a letter to Butler acknowledging his award which indicated the director's mutual respect for Butler and his work behind the camera. "You were the calm before, during and after every storm on the set of Jaws," Spielberg wrote in the letter. "Without your zen-like confidence and wonderful sense of humor, I would have gone the way of the rest of the Jaws crew — totally out of my friggin' mind. Congratulations on this well-deserved career achievement award from your peers. All my best, Steven."

== Personal life ==
Butler resided in Montana. On June 1, 2014, Butler returned to his hometown of Mount Pleasant for a reception honoring his career.

Butler had five daughters, three from his first marriage to Alma H. Smith, and two from his second marriage to Iris Butler.

=== Death ===
Butler turned 100 on April 7, 2021, and died in Lakeside, Montana on April 5, 2023, aged 101, two days shy of what would have been his 102nd birthday.

== Filmography ==
=== Film ===
Year	Title	Director	Notes
1967	Fearless Frank	Philip Kaufman	
1969	The Rain People	Francis Ford Coppola	
1970	Adam's Woman	Philip Leacock	
1971	Drive, He Said	Jack Nicholson	
1971	The Return of Count Yorga	Bob Kelljan	
1972	Deathmaster	Ray Danton	
1972	The Godfather	Francis Ford Coppola	2nd unit and additional photography (uncredited)
1972	Melinda	Hugh A. Robertson	
1972	Hickey & Boggs	Robert Culp	
1972	Deliverance	John Boorman	2nd unit photography
1973	Running Wild	Robert McCahon	
1974	The Conversation	Francis Ford Coppola	Replaced Haskell Wexler
1975	The Manchu Eagle Murder Caper Mystery	Dean Hargrove	
1975	Jaws	Steven Spielberg	
1975	One Flew Over the Cuckoo's Nest	Miloš Forman	Replaced Haskell Wexler
1976	Lipstick	Lamont Johnson	
1976	The Bingo Long Traveling All-Stars & Motor Kings	John Badham	
1976	Alex & the Gypsy	John Korty	
1977	Demon Seed	Donald Cammell	
1977	Capricorn One	Peter Hyams	
1978	Damien - Omen II	Don Taylor	
1978	Grease	Randal Kleiser	
1978	Uncle Joe Shannon	Joseph Hanwright	
1978	Ice Castles	Donald Wrye	
1979	Rocky II	Sylvester Stallone	
1980	Can't Stop the Music	Nancy Walker	
1980	It's My Turn	Claudia Weill	
1981	The Night the Lights Went Out in Georgia	Ronald F. Maxwell	
1981	Stripes	Ivan Reitman	
1982	Rocky III	Sylvester Stallone	
1983	The Sting II	Jeremy Kagan	
1985	Beer	Patrick Kelly	
1985	Rocky IV	Sylvester Stallone	
1986	Legal Eagles	Ivan Reitman	Additional photography
1986	Big Trouble	John Cassavetes	
1988	Biloxi Blues	Mike Nichols	
1988	Wildfire	Zalman King	
1988	Child's Play	Tom Holland	
1990	Graffiti Bridge	Prince	
1991	Hot Shots!	Jim Abrahams	
1993	Sniper	Luis Llosa	
1993	Cop and a Half	Henry Winkler	
1993	Beethoven's 2nd	Rod Daniel	
1996	Flipper	Alan Shapiro	
1996	Mother	Albert Brooks	Director of photography: San Francisco unit
1997	Anaconda	Luis Llosa	
1997	Deceiver	Jonas Pate; Josh Pate	
2000	Ropewalk	Matt Brown	
2001	Frailty	Bill Paxton	
2006	Funny Money	Leslie Greif	
2006	The Plague	Hal Masonberg	
2007	Redline	Andy Cheng	
2008	The Chauffeur	Jérôme Dassier	
2009	Evil Angel	Richard Dutcher	
2016	The Boys at the Bar	Richard Dutcher	

Short films

Year	Title	Director	Notes
1968	A Space to Grow	Robert O'Donnel	Documentary short
2005	Berserker	Josh Eckberg	
2006	Zombie Prom	Vince Marcello	
2008	Looking Up Dresses	Jared Ingram	

=== Television ===
Year	Title	Notes
1972–1973	Ghost Story	5 episodes
1975	McCoy	Episode: "The Big Ripoff"
1991	Brooklyn Bridge	12 episodes
1996	Dark Skies	Episode: "The Awakening (Part 1)"
1999	G vs E	Episode: "Orange Volvo"

TV movies, miniseries, and specials

Year	Title	Director	Notes
1962	The People vs. Paul Crump	William Friedkin	Documentary
1965	The Bold Men (Note: Shared credit with Ángel Bilbatúa, Bob Bukor, Miki Carter, James Crabe, Doyle Fields, Vilis Lapenieks, Grant Rohloff, Primo Sanchez, Bud S. Smith)	William Friedkin	Documentary
1970	A Clear and Present Danger	James Goldstone	
1972	Something Evil	Steven Spielberg	
1973	Savage	Steven Spielberg	
1973	Deliver Us from Evil	Boris Sagal	
1973	Sunshine	Joseph Sargent	
1973	I Heard the Owl Call My Name	Daryl Duke	
1974	Indict and Convict	Boris Sagal	
1974	The Execution of Private Slovik	Lamont Johnson	
1975	Target Risk	Robert Scheerer	
1975	Hustling	Joseph Sargent	
1975	Fear on Trial	Lamont Johnson	
1976	Raid on Entebbe	Irvin Kershner	
1977	Mary White	Jud Taylor	
1980	Death Ray 2000	Lee H. Katzin	
1981	Killing at Hell's Gate	Jerry Jameson	
1983	The Thorn Birds	Daryl Duke	
1984	A Streetcar Named Desire	John Erman	
1987	Bates Motel	Richard Rothstein	
1989	When We Were Young	Daryl Duke	
1995	A Walton Wedding	Robert Ellis Miller	
1997	Don King: Only in America	John Herzfeld	
1999	Passing Glory	Steve James	
2000	Hendrix	Leon Ichaso	with Claudio Chea
2002	Joe and Max	Steve James	

== Awards and nominations ==
Institution	Year	Category	Work	Result	Ref.
Academy Awards	1976	Best Cinematography	One Flew Over the Cuckoo's Nest	Nominated	
BAFTA Awards	1977	Best Cinematography	One Flew Over the Cuckoo's Nest	Nominated	
Charleston International Film Festival	2013	Lifetime Achievement Award	—N/a	Nominated	
Primetime Emmy Awards	1976	Outstanding Cinematography for a Limited or Anthology Series or Movie	Raid on Entebbe	Won	
Primetime Emmy Awards	1983	Outstanding Cinematography for a Limited or Anthology Series or Movie	The Thorn Birds	Nominated	
Primetime Emmy Awards	1984	Outstanding Cinematography for a Limited or Anthology Series or Movie	A Streetcar Named Desire	Won	
Stockholm International Film Festival	1997	Best Cinematography	Deceiver	Won	
American Society of Cinematographers	2003	Lifetime Achievement Award	—N/a	Won	
