= Dan Lebental =

American film editor

- Occupation: Film editor

Dan Lebental is an American film editor who has edited many films for the Marvel Cinematic Universe.

== Filmography ==
=== Films ===
Year	Title	Director	Notes			
1991	Title	Director	Notes	The Lounge People	Bradd Saunders	—N/a
1993	Murder Was the Case	Jonathan Kahn	Edited with Robert Brown; Short film			
1994	Murder Was the Case	Dr. Dre; Fab Five Freddy	Short film			
1995	Dead Presidents	Hughes brothers	—N/a			
1996	Don't Look Back	Geoff Murphy	—N/a			
1997	Deceiver	Jonas Pate; Josh Pate	—N/a			
1998	Very Bad Things	Peter Berg	—N/a			
2000	Where the Money Is	Marek Kanievska	Edited with Garth Craven and Samuel Craven			
2001	Happy Campers	Jonas Pate; Josh Pate	—N/a			
2001	From Hell	Hughes brothers	Edited with George Bowers			
2003	11:14	Greg Marcks	Edited with Richard Nord			
2003	Elf	Jon Favreau	—N/a			
2005	Zathura: A Space Adventure	Jon Favreau	—N/a			
2006	The Woods	Lucky McKee	Edited with Joel Plotch			
2006	The Break-Up	Peyton Reed	Edited with David Rosenbloom			
2006	Wild West Comedy Show: 30 Days and 30 Nights – Hollywood to the Heartland	Ari Sandel	Edited with Jim Kelly			
2008	Iron Man	Jon Favreau	—N/a			
2009	Couples Retreat	Peter Billingsley	Edited with Pietro Scalia			
2010	Iron Man 2	Jon Favreau	Edited with Richard Pearson			
2011	Cowboys & Aliens	Jon Favreau	—N/a			
2012	Art of Conflict: The Murals of Northern Ireland	Valeri Vaughn	Edited with Jim Kelly			
2013	Thor: The Dark World	Alan Taylor	Edited with Wyatt Smith			
2014	All Hail the King	Drew Pearce	Short film			
2015	Ant-Man	Peyton Reed	Edited with Colby Parker Jr.			
2016	Term Life	Peter Billingsley	Edited with Kevin Stermer			
2017	CHiPs	Dax Shepard	Edited with Kevin Stermer			
2017	Spider-Man: Homecoming	Jon Watts	Edited with Debbie Berman			
2018	Ant-Man and the Wasp	Peyton Reed	Edited with Craig Wood			
2019	Spider-Man: Far From Home	Jon Watts	Edited with Leigh Folsom Boyd			
2020	Bad Boys for Life	Adil & Bilall	Edited with Peter McNulty			
2021	Mortal Kombat	Simon McQuoid	Edited with Scott Gray			
2022	There Are No Saints	Alfonso Pineda Ulloa	—N/a			
2023	Dungeons & Dragons: Honor Among Thieves	Jonathan Goldstein; John Francis Daley	—N/a			
2024	Bad Boys: Ride or Die	Adil & Bilall	Edited with Asaf Eisenberg			
2024	Beverly Hills Cop: Axel F	Mark Molloy	—N/a			

=== Television ===
Year	Title	Notes		
2000	Title	Notes	Wonderland	Pilot episode
2001	Dinner for Five	Pilot episode		
2000	In Case of Emergency	Pilot episode		

=== Music video ===
Year	Title	Artist	Director	Notes				
2000	Title	Artist	Director	Notes	"The Real Slim Shady"	Eminem	Philip Atwell; Dr. Dre	—N/a
