= How Did I Get Here =

- Friday Night Lights episode
- Episode no.: Season 2 Episode 6
- Directed by: Jonas Pate
- Written by: Carter Harris
- Cinematography by: Todd McMullen
- Editing by: Ron Rosen
- Original release date: November 9, 2007
- Running time: 43 minutes

Guest appearances
- Glenn Morshower as Chad Clarke; Jessalyn Gilsig as Shelley Hayes; Brad Leland as Buddy Garrity; Benny Ciaramello as Santiago Herrera; Alanna Ubach as Roberta "Bobbie" Roberts; Kim Smith as Lauren Davis

Episode chronology
← Previous "Let's Get It On"	Next → "Pantherama!"
- Friday Night Lights (season 2)

"How Did I Get Here" is the sixth episode of the second season of the American sports drama television series Friday Night Lights, inspired by the 1990 nonfiction book by H. G. Bissinger. It is the 28th overall episode of the series and was written by supervising producer Carter Harris and directed by Jonas Pate. It originally aired on NBC on November 9, 2007.

The series is set in the fictional town of Dillon, a small, close-knit community in rural West Texas. It follows a high school football team, the Dillon Panthers. It features a set of characters, primarily connected to Coach Eric Taylor, his wife Tami, and their daughter Julie. In the episode, the Taylors are visited by Tami's sister, while Jason questions his future. Landry is confronted by his father, while Matt spends time with a new girl.

According to Nielsen Media Research, the episode was seen by an estimated 5.56 million household viewers and gained a 1.9 ratings share among adults aged 18–49. The episode received positive reviews from critics, who praised the character development and some deemed it an improvement over the previous episodes, but Landry's subplot was heavily panned.

== Plot ==
Lyla (Minka Kelly), Jason (Scott Porter), and Tim (Taylor Kitsch) arrive at Dillon. Eric (Kyle Chandler) angrily confronts Buddy (Brad Leland) after discovering that his salary was reduced by 37%. Buddy explains that the booster club's funds were depleted due to McGregor's lawsuit and his hiring, but Eric demands that he fix the problem. Eric and Tami (Connie Britton) must also deal with the arrival of Shelley (Jessalyn Gilsig), Tami's sister.

Tim is surprised when he finds his locker empty. When he talks with Eric, Eric informs him that he is off the team for his absence. Buddy convinces Eric in getting Santiago (Benny Ciaramello) onto the team; while he is fast, he struggles in catching or holding the ball. Lyla visits Tim and asks him in coaching Santiago, but he refuses. Without Tim's blocking, Smash (Gaius Charles) struggles in completing his runs, so he forces Tim to attend dinner with him to get him in his senses.

Eric is told that he can be offered the position of athletic director, although its payment would be a "spitting distance" from his salary from the previous season, he accepts as he is told it will not make much difference from his duties. He visits Jason and gets him his job back as assistant coach. However, Jason questions if people change around town and visits Lyla at church for advice. Julie (Aimee Teegarden) visits Matt (Zach Gilford) at the Alamo Freeze, where she apologizes for her behavior and asks if they could be friends, which he accepts. At Jason's birthday party, Julie is devastated when she sees Matt kissing Lauren (Kim Smith), a new girl who was flirting with him. After the party ends, Jason tells Eric that he is leaving the coaching staff, as he wishes to move on towards a new life.

Chad (Glenn Morshower) is informed that car seat fibers were found in the dead man's jacket zipper, and that a 1974-1978 GMC car might be involved. Chad confronts Landry, as the car is very identical to his. Landry finally confesses that he accidentally killed the man, so Chad takes him to a desert area where they burn the car and erase any track to Landry.

At his office, Eric is confronted by Roberta "Bobbie" Roberts (Alanna Ubach), Dillon's soccer coach, who is not delighted about the limited equipment and treatment that her team is receiving as football is prioritized. When Shelley suggests a day out with Tami, she finally breaks down, claiming that she is exhausted with her life and it will become even more difficult with Gracie growing up to become someone like Julie. Shelley apologizes, admitting she failed in her life. Tim decides to help Santiago in the field, and he is joined by Matt and Smash. Eric notices him and invites Santiago to join practice the next day. When Tim asks if he is back, Eric laughs replying "Not even close." Despite that, they continue training in the field.

== Production ==
=== Development ===
In October 2007, NBC announced that the sixth episode of the season would be titled "How Did I Get Here". The episode was written by supervising producer Carter Harris, and directed by Jonas Pate. This was Harris' fourth writing credit, and Pate's third directing credit.

=== Casting ===
The producers considered casting Rosie O'Donnell, a fan of the series, to play coach Roberta "Bobbie" Roberts.

== Reception ==
=== Viewers ===
In its original American broadcast, "How Did I Get Here" was seen by an estimated 5.56 million household viewers with a 1.9 in the 18–49 demographics. This means that 1.9 percent of all households with televisions watched the episode. It finished 77th out of 101 programs airing from November 5–11, 2007. This was a 3% increase in viewership from the previous episode, which was watched by an estimated 5.40 million household viewers with a 1.8 in the 18–49 demographics.

=== Critical reviews ===
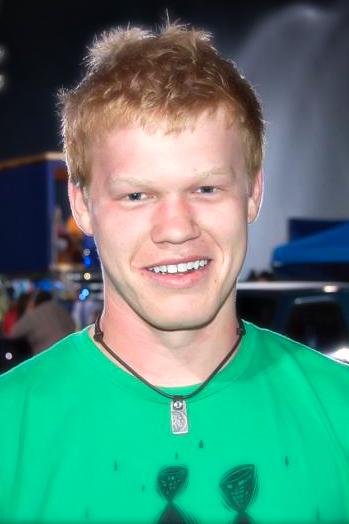
While Jesse Plemons received praise for his performance in the episode, his character's subplot drew negative reception.

"How Did I Get Here" received positive reviews from critics. Eric Goldman of IGN gave the episode a "great" 8 out of 10 and wrote, "Okay, this is more like it. Friday Night Lights seems to finally be feeling more like itself again, returning to much more of the believable situations and interactions that served the show so well in Season 1. It's not perfect yet (and this show has truly been perfect in the past), but we're on the right track."

Scott Tobias of The A.V. Club gave the episode a "B+" grade and wrote, "After last week's glorious episode, we're back in the soup again with this strong but somewhat problematic hour, which was hampered mainly by further developments in the Landry situation." Ken Tucker of Entertainment Weekly wrote, "I'd say Friday Night Lights built on last week's excellent episode. This is one of the few network dramas that can cram in extra characters and not show the strain. It also, thank goodness, still has enough emotion coursing through it to move us not once, not twice, but a number of times throughout the hour."

Alan Sepinwall wrote, "Clearly, Katims and the other writers understand what makes FNL great, and yet somehow they thought the Landry plot was a good idea and a tonal fit with everything else. I don't get it." Leah Friedman of TV Guide wrote, "I effin' love this show. Sometimes it's just too good, and tonight was one of those times. Between the introduction of two new strong women and that fantastic last scene of Tim teaching Santiago how to play football, I'm tempted to call this the best episode of the season so far."

Andrew Johnston of Slant Magazine wrote, "It restores faith in the series not by rejecting the plot elements that have piled up over the first five episodes or by rehashing fan favorite season one devices, but rather by recapturing the unique voice that seduced us all last year, then using it to go deeper. Simply put, 'How Did I Get Here?' is the kind of episode that distinguishes great TV shows from those that are just pretty good." Rick Porter of Zap2it wrote, "It's tempting, as good as about 90 percent of this week's Friday Night Lights was, to just ignore the continuing fallout for Landry and the Incident and focus on the great stuff within the Taylor family, with Street and with Riggins. It's tempting, but it's not possible. Friday's episode only compounded the problem; the show doesn't seem to want to let it go, and so I can't either."

Brett Love of TV Squad wrote, "A lot of set up stuff this week as we get some balls in the air for the next arc of episodes. Overall, all the various parts came together well. After a bumpy start, the show is getting into its rhythm and season two is looking pretty good." Television Without Pity gave the episode a "B+" grade.

Jesse Plemons submitted this episode for consideration for Outstanding Supporting Actor in a Drama Series at the 60th Primetime Emmy Awards.
