= Deceiver (film) =

- Theatrical release poster
- Directed by: Jonas Pate; Josh Pate
- Written by: Jonas Pate; Josh Pate
- Produced by: Mark Damon; Peter Glatzer; John Saviano; Don Winston
- Starring: Tim Roth; Chris Penn; Michael Rooker; Renée Zellweger; Ellen Burstyn; Rosanna Arquette
- Cinematography: Bill Butler
- Edited by: Dan Lebental
- Music by: Harry Gregson-Williams
- Production companies: Metro-Goldwyn-Mayer Pictures; MDP Worldwide
- Distributed by: MGM Distribution Co.
- Release date: August 31, 1997 (Venice Film Festival)
- Running time: 101 minutes
- Country: United States
- Language: English
- Box office: $572,433

Deceiver (UK title: Liar) is a 1997 American mystery film directed by Jonas Pate and Josh Pate, and starring Tim Roth, Chris Penn, Michael Rooker, Rosanna Arquette, Ellen Burstyn and Renée Zellweger. It won Best Cinematography and Best Screenplay at the 1997 Stockholm Film Festival, and the Special Jury Prize at the 1998 Cognac Police Film Festival.

== Plot ==
The grisly murder of a high-end call girl, Elizabeth Loftus, is being investigated by tough detective Kennesaw and his less experienced partner Braxton. (Braxton has an illegal gambling debt of $20,000; upon being asked, Kennesaw agrees to cover half of it to get Braxton out of trouble with the bookie.) The two bring in textile company heir James Wayland for questioning about the murder.

Wayland is an epileptic, which causes memory lapses and occasional acts of violence during epileptic episodes. He is given a lie detector test, but passes repeatedly. After three days of interrogation, he turns the tables on his interrogators. He knows about Braxton's gambling debt and drops the full amount on the table. He then reveals that Kennesaw's wife had an affair, and that Kennesaw acted out his anger at his wife with Loftus. Wayland produces a video tape that shows Kennesaw assaulting Loftus in her apartment. He challenges Kennesaw to take the lie-detector test; Kennesaw passes the question "Did you kill Elizabeth Loftus?" but fails the question "Did you kill your wife?" Braxton reminds Kennesaw that his wife is alive, to which Wayland responds, "Yes, well, Ken's a little confused about who his wife actually is." Wayland accuses Kennesaw of killing Loftus in place of killing his wife, with whom he was enraged.

Having cleared himself of the murder, Wayland makes to leave the interrogation room. Kennesaw, in a state of high agitation and distress, demands he sit back down. Determined to get a straight answer out of Wayland, he pulls out his revolver and loads one bullet into it, spins the chamber, counts to three, and pulls the trigger; it doesn't fire. He does this two more times before Braxton can physically restrain him, but he throws Braxton off and again threatens Wayland. Wayland finally agrees to talk.

Wayland states he had been with Loftus in her apartment the night she was killed. He'd left to buy beer, and when he returned, he heard commotion inside her apartment and then a sound like someone leaving from the back exit. When he entered the apartment, he found Loftus dead. Afraid he would be implicated, he decided to create a murder scene that would be considered "out of character" for someone such as himself, thereby reducing the likelihood he would be considered a probable suspect. He therefore cut Loftus in half and carried her out of the apartment in suitcases.

The stress of recounting the events brings on an epileptic fit, during which he hits his head and dies. While the paramedics are removing the body, we see a black-gloved hand pick up the bottle of pills Wayland had taken during the last part of the interrogation, and which he had left on the cooler; this is not the same bottle he'd produced days earlier to show the officers what he took for his epilepsy.

Some time later, Braxton has applied for and received a transfer, despite being up for a promotion—it's rumored it's because he can't get along with Kennesaw. After packing up his desk, Braxton drops an envelope full of large bills into Kennesaw's desk drawer.

One year later, a man approaches a young woman sitting on a park bench late at night and tries to strike up a conversation. She responds, "You can get into a lot of trouble being out this late," and gets up to leave. The camera pans to the man's face and it's Wayland. He responds, "That's the idea."

== Cast ==
- Tim Roth as James Walter Wayland
- Chris Penn as Detective Phillip Braxton
- Ellen Burstyn as "Mook"
- Renée Zellweger as Elizabeth
- Michael Rooker as Detective Edward Kennesaw
- Rosanna Arquette as Mrs. Kennesaw
- Michael Parks as Dr. Banyard
- Mark Damon as Wayland's father

== Reception ==
The film received a mixed reaction from critics. Rotten Tomatoes gives Deceiver a rating of 42% from 31 reviews. The film was described as follows: "twisty bit of trickery, Deceiver is gripping without ever being really good".
