= The Take (2007 film) =

2007 film by Brad Furman

- DVD cover
- Directed by: Brad Furman
- Written by: Jonas Pate; Josh Pate
- Produced by: Braxton Pope; Andrew Weiner
- Starring: John Leguizamo; Tyrese Gibson; Bobby Cannavale; Rosie Perez
- Cinematography: Lukas Ettlin
- Edited by: Edie Bleiman
- Music by: Chris Hajian
- Release dates: September 12, 2007 (Toronto International Film Festival); April 11, 2008
- Running time: 96 minutes
- Country: United States
- Language: English

The Take is a 2007 American crime drama film directed by Brad Furman and starring John Leguizamo, Tyrese Gibson, Bobby Cannavale, and Rosie Perez. The plot concerns an armored-truck driver who survives a violent hijacking and becomes obsessed with tracking down his attackers. It was released on April 11, 2008.

== Plot synopsis ==
Felix De La Pena (John Leguizamo) is a hardworking armored-truck driver, a loving husband to his wife Marina (Rosie Perez) and a caring father of two in Los Angeles's Boyle Heights neighborhood. After being abducted and shot in the head during a hijacking led by Adell Baldwin (Tyrese Gibson), Felix loses his memory, exhibits erratic post-trauma behavior, and is framed as a prime suspect for the crime. Since he cannot provide any leads to FBI agent Steve Perelli (Bobby Cannavale), Felix is forced to try to find his assailant by himself.

== Cast ==
- John Leguizamo as Felix De La Pena
- Tyrese Gibson as Adell Baldwin
- Bobby Cannavale as Agent Steve Perelli
- Rosie Perez as Marina De La Pena

== Production ==
Both John Leguizamo and Rosie Perez admitted sex scenes with them together felt uncomfortable because they are close friends and attend church together.

== Reviews ==
- Weitzman, Elizabeth (April 11, 2008). "'The Take' a sturdy vehicle for John Leguizamo". Daily News. Archived from the original on April 20, 2008.
- Anderson, John (October 2, 2007). "The Take Review". Variety.
- Saltz, Rachel (April 11, 2008). "Daily Life and Its Disruption". The New York Times. Archived from the original on May 5, 2016.
- "Rosie Perez: Filming Sex Scene With John Leguizamo for 'The Take' Was 'Very Awkward'". Fox News. Associated Press. April 7, 2008.
