= Believe (TV series) =

American fantasy drama television series

- Genre: Fantasy; Drama; Science fiction
- Created by: Alfonso Cuarón; Mark Friedman
- Starring: Jake McLaughlin; Johnny Sequoyah; Jamie Chung; Kyle MacLachlan; Delroy Lindo
- Composer: Steven Price
- Country of origin: United States
- Original language: English
- No. of seasons: 1
- No. of episodes: 13 (1 unaired)

Production
- Executive producers: Alfonso Cuarón; J. J. Abrams; Mark Friedman (pilot only); Bryan Burk; Jonas Pate; Hans Tobeason
- Producers: Seamus Kevin Fahey; Tamara Isaac; Athena Wickham; David DeClerque
- Production location: New York, New York
- Cinematography: Christopher Norr; Gonzalo Amat, AEC
- Editors: Jennifer Van Goethem; Rich Fox; Annette Davey; Timothy A. Good, A.C.E.; Brian A. Kates, A.C.E.
- Camera setup: Single-camera
- Running time: 43 minutes
- Production companies: Bad Robot; Esperanto Filmoj; Bonanza Productions; Warner Bros. Television

Original release
- Network: NBC
- Release: March 10 – June 15, 2014

Believe is an American fantasy drama television series that was broadcast as part of the 2013–14 United States network television schedule on NBC as a mid-season entry. Originally 13 episodes were to be aired, but only 12 were aired in the U.S. The series was created by Alfonso Cuarón and Mark Friedman. The series began on March 10, 2014, and was canceled on May 9, 2014. The final episode aired on June 15, 2014.

== Plot ==
Bo is a young girl who was born with special supernatural abilities that she could not control. As these powers started evolving, the people who were protecting her were forced to turn to an outsider for help. This led them to William Tate, a wrongfully convicted death-row inmate, whom they break out of prison. Although he is reluctant to take on the role as her protector, the two eventually form a bond that guide them to helping each other, as well as others, while staying one step ahead of the evil forces that want the girl.

== Cast and characters ==
=== Main ===
- Jake McLaughlin as William Tate, Jr. – Originally a death row inmate in a national security prison, Tate is weathered and jaded from seven years of imprisonment and the painful loss of his soul mate Nina Adams (not knowing Skouras forced her to end their relationship). Tate has recurring anger problems, leading to a long history of violence and brushes with the law. Minutes before his execution for two counts of felony murder (of which he claims he is innocent, something no one ever believed, having been framed by his friends during a robbery), Winter (disguised as a priest) visits him and offers a chance at freedom if he agrees to protect Bo. Tate reluctantly agrees to accept Winter's assistance, and later his employment offer as Bo's protector. Originally he is unaware that he is actually Bo's father (a fact known by Winter's team, the Orchestra Project and the FBI), but Winter is later encouraged by Bo to tell him – while the news sounds unbelievable, he senses he somehow knew all along. Afterwards, he becomes a more kind and supportive parent figure.
- Johnny Sequoyah as Bo Adams – An extraordinarily gifted girl with the power to change the world. She was one of Winter's most promising subjects, born and raised at Orchestra and displaying extraordinary psychic and telekinetic powers inherited from her mother, Nina. To the government, Bo's existence is highly classified government property and is officially a national defense priority. Bo herself is regarded as a federal asset and ward of the U.S. government, with no family. Winter is the only person Bo knows she can trust, and also she considers his team the closest thing to a family she has, but she steadily develops a bond with Tate after he repeatedly risks his life and freedom for her. Originally, she was unaware that Tate is her father, although later correctly guesses, and accepts, the truth.
- Jamie Chung as Janice Channing – Winter's second in command and an Orchestra fugitive. Dedicated, tough and strong-willed, Channing is devoted to protecting Bo. She frequently clashes with Tate, openly doubting his loyalty and feels the arrangement for him to act as Bo's protector is never going to work – Channing sees herself as a mother figure to Bo, and believes she would be better at protecting the child, although later accepts Tate as a worthy parent figure. According to her background, she is a combat-trained fighter who was Orchestra's head of security – she worked at the Orchestra Campus for Skouras for several years, hired to effectively keep Bo captive. Later she deployed as an operative to recover Bo, although she instead turned Channing against Skouras after she had healed the injuries Channing sustained trying to capture her.
- Kyle MacLachlan as Dr. Roman Skouras – A world-famous geneticist and head of Orchestra - a government sanctioned program and top secret classified operation designed to weaponize individuals with psychic abilities, funding it through his corporation Skouras Worldwide. Skouras is Winter's old partner, now mortal enemy. He is admired by many people for his work, and is a publicly awarded humanitarian, although others know he only cares about his own ideas and doing anything to achieve them. Skouras is a very powerful man working in cooperation with high-level elements of the U.S. government to locate Tate and recover Bo unharmed. He subsequently employs assassins, hires mercenaries and uses every resource at his command to recover the gifted prodigy and return her home to Orchestra. He claims he is only acting to protect Bo and offer proper guidance as a gifted telekinetic and psychic, but in truth he wants to market Bo's abilities as a weapon to the military. His nefarious schemes cost him his partnership with Winter who, with his team, broke ranks and fled with Bo, as Skouras's goals would endanger her. Skouras's erratic behavior and questionable experimentation methods (which are caused in no small part by pressure from the military, who are putting him under increasing pressure to deliver a telepathic weapon as he had originally promised) leads his other researchers to doubt his intentions, but also to improvements in his other telepathic subjects, which he uses to further his objectives for Bo. According to his background, his parents are named Evelyn and Ronald, and he was born in Oak Park, Illinois on December 1, 1954. According to Winter, Skouras's darkest secret is he has established another program, a top secret black ops plan for other telepaths; he plans to use his weaponized telepaths to build his own psychic army.
- Delroy Lindo as Dr. Milton Winter – A cunning and brilliant scientist and the leader of a shadow organization responsible for protecting individuals with rare and incredible powers. He is Skouras's old partner, now mortal enemy. He is dedicated to protecting Bo from Skouras and the army of henchmen he employs. Originally, Winter and his team used to work at Project Orchestra beside Skouras, and Winter raised Bo in the facility from infancy. At some point in the process, Winter and his entire team defected from Orchestra, took Bo, and went on the run. Winter also faked his death, working from that point to protect Bo. According to his background, he worked at DARPA and MIT, and was a CIA field agent psychologist – Skouras describes Winter as "the global authority on the conscious and unconscious mind".

=== Recurring ===
- Juri Henley-Cohn as Luke Hayden – One of Winter's team and an Orchestra fugitive. Hayden later becomes disillusioned with the mission to protect Bo after the deaths of four of the ten team members, and ultimately feels he could not make the necessary sacrifices. He abandons the team, and is arrested by the FBI shortly after. Ferrell turns Hayden to apparently give up Winter's command center in New York, only for Ferrell's team to find it deserted.
- Richard Hollis as Robert Gilman – One of Winter's team and an Orchestra fugitive.
- Katie McClellan as Lilah Leeds – One of Winter's team and an Orchestra fugitive. She is a technology specialist, and was on the team that developed Orchestra's prototype telepathic tracking computer.
- Kerry Condon as Dr. Zoe Boyle – Orchestra's head of research and Winter's replacement, Zoe is Skouras's head researcher and loyal confidant at Orchestra, who runs the research program following Winter's departure – working to continue experiments with the other talented telepaths at the facility. Zoe helped Winter raise Bo, and cares about her very deeply. After Winter's departure, Zoe wants Bo returned home to Orchestra (primarily due to the possibility that Bo's health could degrade due to her abilities), seeing her as one of a kind and vulnerable in the outside world. Nevertheless, Bo remains the common ground that allows Winter and Zoe to trust each other - she is aware that Winter took Bo as the military would use her as a weapon, and also isn't comfortable with Skouras's excessive experimentation methods. In no position to challenge his authority, Zoe secretly acts as Winter's mole inside the Orchestra Campus, until she is exposed to Skouras by Dani, another test subject. Skouras has Dani mentally erase all of Zoe's memories of Bo and Orchestra.
- Arian Moayed as Corey – A technology specialist working at Orchestra. He is completely loyal to Skouras.
- Erik LaRay Harvey as Marcus Krakauer – A mercenary on loan from the CIA, and a tracker not on the FBI's radar, who is rumored to be psychotic. He is hired by Skouras as an operative to track down Bo and Tate.
- Nick Tarabay as Niko Zepeda – Skouras's henchman working at Orchestra.
- Peter McRobbie as FBI Director Lofton – The Director of the FBI and Ferrell's superior. He is one of the government administration members working with Skouras and Orchestra. He acts as a liaison with Skouras to the government, while also giving Ferrell permission to use federal orders and other ample resources for the investigation to locate and recover Bo. Later, Ferrell informs Lofton she has quit the Tate case but will still remain with the FBI.
- Trieste Kelly Dunn as FBI Special Agent Elizabeth Ferrell – The FBI agent in charge of full-fledged manhunt launched to recapture escaped death row inmate William Tate, Ferrell is solicited by the Director of the FBI to help and work with Skouras and Orchestra to track down Tate and Bo. Skouras emphasizes repeatedly that Bo is his top priority, assuring her that Bo's safety is his main concern, but she can tell he's not being entirely honest with her. Ferrell issues a nationwide Amber alert, broadcasting photos of Bo and Tate on every news channel over Skouras's repeated objections. Originally adopting traditional FBI methods to apprehend Tate, whom she sees as a very dangerous fugitive, and "rescue" Bo, whom she sees as an endangered minor, Ferrell steadily begins to understand what Bo is capable of, and also begins realizing there is more behind the manhunt than originally assumed. According to her background, she has a young daughter named Sasha. After Tate and Bo save Ferrell and her daughter from a subway bombing, Ferrell finally accepts Tate's innocence and abandons her pursuit.
- Matthew Rauch as FBI Agent Martin – One of Ferrell's two best agents.
- Ato Essandoh as FBI Agent Garner – One of Ferrell's two best agents.
- Rob Morgan as Joshua Carpenter – An Orchestra test subject, Joshua was a promising telepath capable of matter manipulation, who has been with Orchestra almost three years, and was one of Skouras's most talented subjects. His experimentation had left him fully weaponized as an active telepathic assassin. Skouras sent his new weapon on a field assignment – to track down Bo and locate and neutralize Orchestra's unknown insider leak (Zoe Boyle). During the confrontation, however, Bo attacked and left him incapacitated as he is mentally erasing a blogger's mind. Left in a coma with no possibility to recover, Skouras encouraged Shawn, his friend and fellow test subject, to "help" Joshua by putting him out of his misery, as well as showing his own strength. Shawn reluctantly kills his friend at Skouras' request.
- Owen Campbell as Shawn – An Orchestra test subject, Shawn is a promising telepath, not as powerful as Bo. He has suffered severe behavioral and emotional problems due to his ability, although Orchestra has worked hard to harness his gifts. Skouras orders Shawn's rapid development to satisfy Orchestra's military superiors, over Zoe's objections that Shawn's control over his abilities was fragile, and the risk of instability was too great. Skouras encourages Shawn to accept and embrace his gifts, and manipulates him into becoming an active telepathic assassin. Shawn reluctantly kills Joshua, his friend and fellow test subject now comatose, with his powers to show his strength.
- Mia Vallet as Dani – An extremely powerful telepath who was inadvertently discovered by Orchestra (when her powers are detected by Skouras's telepathic tracking computer), Dani is the most powerful telepath Orchestra has come across since Bo, but she is untrusting and fiercely independent when she quickly realizes the extent of her power. Skouras meets with Dani and eventually convinces her to be taken to Orchestra, and accepts Skouras' training to make her abilities stronger. Skouras sees Dani as his next masterpiece – intending to turn her into his new weapon. Dani discovers Zoe is the Orchestra mole, and threatens to out her to Skouras if she interferes with Skouras' plan. According to her background, she is a homeless runaway with no family or friends, previously involved in foster care and group homes. Her earliest memory of having an ability was when she was five, while at school, she started telekinetically moving pencils, but her parents thought she was lying. When she was twelve, they became afraid of their daughter when they thought Dani killed her brother in an angry rage over her stolen diary.

== Episodes ==
No.	Title	Directed by	Written by	Original release date	Prod. code	U.S. viewers (millions)
1	"Pilot"	Alfonso Cuarón	Alfonso Cuarón & Mark Friedman	March 10, 2014	296842	10.56
A car carrying young Bo Adams and her foster parents is forced off the road by an assassin, Moore, who mercilessly kills the adults. Emergency services arrive and take Bo to a hospital. Meanwhile, William Tate, a death row inmate about to be executed, is attended by a bogus priest, Milton Winter, who offers to help him escape. Winter recruits him to save Bo from those hunting her. Tate, jaded by years of unjust imprisonment, is dubious, but accepts the offer as he is led to the execution chamber. Winter's team breaks him out and sneaks him into the hospital to retrieve Bo. The two work together to thwart Moore and escape. Tate learns that the assignment is more long-term than he thought, but, accepting that he already senses an emotional connection, Tate accepts his role as Bo's protector and carer. Moore—directed behind the scenes by project Orchestra—appears at Winter's safe house, where she kills several guards and fights Tate. Bo uses her powers to stop her killing Tate, giving the team time to escape. Tate and Bo board a bus to Atlantic City, expecting to rejoin the team in Philadelphia. As the two set off, Winter calls Skouras—his nemesis and former partner—to gloat that Moore has failed, then reveals to his second in command, Channing, that Tate is Bo's father.
2	"Beginner's Luck"	Omar Madha	Jonas Pate & Bobby Arnot	March 16, 2014	2J7906	6.57
Bo and Tate use the time on the bus to get to know each other. Bo uses her powers to get them through a police blockade. Tate, low on cash, convinces her to use her powers to gamble and earn money at a casino. FBI agent Elizabeth Ferrell, already investigating Tate, is sent to be briefed by Skouras and his head researcher, Zoe Boyle, about Bo. She and her team are given a tour of Orchestra, a top secret project—which Winter and his team used to work for—to study subjects like Bo. They witness first-hand a demonstration of a paranormal ability. Although dubious of Skouras's honesty, Ferrell decides to work with him to recover Bo. She issues an Amber alert for Bo, resulting in Tate and Bo being spotted at the casino. Making their way out of town, Tate and Bo get help from a friendly casino waitress. She needs money for treatment for her son with leukemia, so Bo leaves her the money she helped win (which she finds later). While the FBI and local police pursue them, Skouras also hires a mercenary, Marcus Krakauer, to hunt the pair down. Tate steals a car, but when they stop for gas, Krakauer intercepts them and fights Tate to recover Bo. Tate ultimately defeats him and they escape, but Krakauer blows up the gas station in the process. After a flat tire, they are caught by the police. Tate is arrested and Bo is taken away in another car. Krakauer reports to Skouras that Tate and the girl are in custody. It is revealed that the policemen were bogus and actually Winter and his team.
3	"Origin"	Stephen Williams	Jonas Pate	March 23, 2014	2J7907	5.13
Winter and Skouras meet. Skouras offers Winter a final chance to rejoin Orchestra: to ensure Bo's health and safety, to preserve the work they did together, and to honor the memory of Bo's mother, Nina Adams. Winter defiantly declares that Skouras will never get Bo. Flashbacks reveal Nina's recruitment to the project, her friendship with Winter, and Winter becoming a parent figure to Bo after Nina's death in childbirth. In the present, Hayden, one of Winter's team, can no longer endure the sacrifices he is forced to make and quits. Meanwhile, Bo and Tate are in Manhattan on their way to Philadelphia, their social dynamic deepening. They meet a very wealthy woman, who still mourns the loss of a son taken from her when she fled her country decades ago. Later at a pawn shop they realize one of the employees is her son, who had survived and also escaped to the US. The pair arrange a tearful reunion. Agent Ferrell's team locates Tate and Bo in New York when security footage shows them exiting a Manhattan toll booth. On leaving the mother's apartment, they are apprehended by NYPD officers; Bo uses her abilities to unlock Tate's handcuffs and dismantle an officer's pistol. They run, closely pursued by Ferrell and her agents, to rendezvous with Winter and escape via the subway.
4	"Defection"	Sam Hill	Nick Antosca	March 30, 2014	2J7908	4.89
Bo and Tate remain on the run in Manhattan, with Winter and his people desperately working to get out before the island is locked down completely. Ferrell learns from the FBI Director of Tate's connection to Bo, but is surprised that Bo, when caught, will be returned to Orchestra as a government ward. At Skouras's request, she intensifies the FBI's attempts to bring Tate and Bo into custody. She takes command of the NYPD command center by federal order, and redirects all resources to pursue Tate and Winter and his team and recover Bo. Hayden, Winter's team member who previously left, is arrested by Ferrell's agents. Threatened with a lengthy prison time, he gives up the address for Winter's command center. The address is found deserted. At a safehouse, Bo finds a hidden love letter. She leaves the safehouse to find first the addressee, then the author, who was blinded during military service and pushed his lover away so as not to be a burden. Bo (now joined by Tate) brings them together and they begin to reconcile. Meanwhile, Skouras's team has developed technology to remotely detect Bo's use of her powers. Tate and Bo are intercepted by Ferrell and her agents, but Bo telekinetically lifts a taxi cab off the ground and drops it between them: her abilities are stronger in Tate's presence. Tate and Bo race to meet a freighter Winter has arranged to get them off the island. Tate and Bo's bond deepens and he tells her that he has learned things from her.
5	"White Noise"	Jonas Pate	Dave Erickson	April 6, 2014	2J7902	4.25
Bo and Tate have made it to Philadelphia. A blogger is called by an anonymous source and given a lead to Orchestra, with enough information to expose Skouras and his superiors. Coincidentally, Bo meets and befriends the blogger's wife, who is pregnant. Skouras sends a henchman, Niko Zepeda, to identify and silence the blogger and his source. Zepeda finds the blogger and his wife, but Bo leads Tate and Channing to their home in time to rescue them. The blogger plans a meeting with the source, still wanting to expose Orchestra even when he learns his wife is pregnant. Winter talks him down, explaining that the truth can only be revealed at the right moment: only then does he see how much his desire for fame and wealth is costing him. Skouras sends a paranormal, Joshua, to silence the blogger and identify the traitor within Orchestra. Joshua mentally attacks the blogger, trying to erase his mind. Bo retaliates, incapacitating Joshua. Afterwards, Bo expresses her distress that her actions caused somebody harm, and considers her abilities a curse. She uses her power to remove Tate's tracking bracelet, giving him the choice to go off on his own, if he wants. The source—intimated to be Zoe—escapes detection by Skouras.
6	"Sinking"	Roxann Dawson	Seamus Kevin Fahey	April 13, 2014	2J7904	4.34
Tate uses his new freedom to return to his hometown seeking vengeance on the friends who framed him for murder and let him serve 7 years on death row. Bo, Winter and Channing pursue him. Tate has a frosty reunion with his estranged father, William Tate Sr.—a social pariah since Tate's conviction. Police and Agent Ferrell's FBI team learn of Tate's presence and arrive to lock the area down. Bo helps Tate mend fences with his father and get a measure of justice on the man responsible for tarnishing his name. Impressed by Tate's restraint, Winter finally decides to tell Tate that Bo is his daughter. Tate is shocked and brought close to tears. Meanwhile, Skouras is under pressure from his superiors at the Department of Defense: he focuses his attention on delivering a telepathic assassin, as he promised. He gets Shawn, a young telepath, weaponized and ready for deployment by convincing him to use his power to kill the comatose Joshua.
7	"Bang and Blame"	Michael Offer	Brynn Malone	April 20, 2014	2J7905	4.54
Winter's group is ambushed by Orchestra agents led by Zepeda, who shoots Bo is shot in the leg with a tranquilizer dart; the group escapes, taking Zepeda prisoner. With Bo steadily falling into a coma, Winter takes her to a couple who were her guardians shortly after her original escape from Orchestra. Believing Bo is dying, Winter calls Zoe at Orchestra. Winter and Tate rendezvous with Zoe, but discover she is being followed, on Skouras's orders. Despite wanting Bo returned to Orchestra, Zoe provides a syringe that might revive Bo from her coma. It is used, but apparently fails. Realizing that Bo's abilities (which she cannot control) are somehow behind her worsening condition, Tate frees Zepeda so he will take Bo back to Orchestra. The others oppose his decision, and, after a standoff, Zepeda escapes without Bo. Meanwhile, Bo has been on a spiritual journey while in coma. She uses her abilities to bring Tate into her vision. She learns Tate is her father, and his love for her causes her to awaken. Also during this time, Channing's history has been revealed in flashback. She was Orchestra's head of security. Originally feeling nothing for Bo, she pursued her to the couple's farm and almost killed the couple, sustaining serious injury herself. Nevertheless, Bo healed Channing, causing her to turn to Winter's side.
8	"Together"	Bart Freundlich	Story by : Seamus Kevin Fahey; Teleplay by : Seamus Kevin Fahey & Sneha Koorse	April 27, 2014	2J7909	4.51
Winter is training Bo, pushing her to improve her control of her abilities. Tate interrupts them; he wants Bo to have a more normal childhood. Winter argues they need to be proactive: without more control over her powers, she won't be ready to take on Orchestra—which Winter confirms is his plan. Tate is against confronting Orchestra, but concedes they can't run forever. Meanwhile, Skouras uses the tracking system to pinpoint Bo's telepathic signal, locating the hideout. Krakauer soon arrives with a team, and the group flees. Winter confirms with Zoe that the machine—only a prototype when he was with Orchestra—is fully operational. Leeds, one of Winter's team, builds a chip that will prevent the machine from tracking Bo's signal, while making it appear to work normally. The chip must be inserted directly into the machine—at Orchestra. Tate and Bo are advised to lay low, and Bo not to use her abilities. However, Bo is drawn to a man in debt to a loan shark and being threatened by his enforcer. Tate steps in to negotiate an alternative, which, it turns out, means retrieving a racing horse the loan shark lost in a dodgy bet. Despite the local police being alerted by Agent Ferrell, Bo and Tate succeed and deliver the horse in time to clear the man's debt. Meanwhile, Channing infiltrates Orchestra to install the chip, but is ambushed by Skouras and his guards. On hearing about this, Tate finally agrees for Bo to keep up her training. Zepeda and an Orchestra team storm an apartment in response to Bo's signal; instead they discover a new telepath named Dani.
9	"Prodigy"	Sam Hill	Melisa Wallack	May 4, 2014	2J7910	4.33
While training, Bo "sees" a young violinist's family dying in a car accident. She tells Tate they need do something, but he insists she continue training. She rebels and goes outside, finding a violinist practicing nearby. It is Margaret, the girl from her vision, and they bond. Unable to stop Margaret's family from driving, Bo asks Tate to keep the other driver off the road, which also proves futile. Bo convinces Margaret's parents to take her with them to the recital. When the cars are about to collide, Bo uses her powers to move them at the last second. The other driver turns out to be the New York Philharmonic conductor. Noticing Margaret's violin case, he gives her his business card. Bo has saved the girl's life and changed her future. Meanwhile, Skouras meets Dani, the telepath discovered in the previous episode. He tests her powers, which are very strong. Channing meditates to prevent telepaths from reading her mind, so Skouras brings Dani in to discover the backup meeting location. Skouras and Ferrell's agents move in to capture the team, but Winter, who has anticipated Channing's interrogation, captures Skouras. Winter threatens to tell the government about the top-secret black ops plan to use weaponized telepaths to build a psychic army. He promises not to reveal anything if Channing is returned unharmed. The teams meet to make the exchange, but Skouras fires at Winter. Channing jumps in front of him, taking a bullet to the chest. Zoe calls to tell Winter about Skouras's new weapon, Dani, but Dani arrives and begins to choke her telekinetically. Dani tells her that she knows she is the Orchestra mole, but hasn't told Skouras—yet. Significantly for their relationship, it is during this episode that Tate accepts that Bo's mission is to help people.
10	"Collapse"	David Boyd	Story by : Jonas Pate & Bobby Arnot; Teleplay by : Jonas Pate	May 25, 2014	2J7911	2.92
Channing is alive and recovering from her wounds. Bo has a nightmare about a bomb exploding on a New York subway platform. She and Tate head there, arriving to find Agent Ferrell and her teenage daughter, Sasha, waiting for a train. Ferrell pulls her gun and orders Tate to the floor. Other subway patrons flee, and Bo sees the bomb beneath a bench. They run, but the bomb explodes and a cave-in traps them. Bo befriends Sasha, and Ferrell has to cooperate with Tate to get Sasha out alive. Tate calls Winter, who rushes to the area to look for a way to rescue them without using official crews. Tate and Ferrell find a drainage pipe—a possible escape route. He tells her his story, and she begins to understand Skouras's true nature. Winter guides Tate through the drain system and eventually to a dark corridor with dangerous drop shafts. The group's only flashlight burns out, but Bo sets the dust in the air aglow, giving them enough light to find their way out. Outside, Bo sees the bomber standing nearby. Ferrell chases him into an empty building and they fight. Tate chokes him unconscious, and she allows Tate to go free. She removes herself from his case, but acknowledges that Bo is truly miraculous. Meanwhile, Zoe confronts Skouras about Dani. He says that patients like Dani are why Orchestra exists, but Zoe argues that Dani's unpredictability could damage the project. Later, Dani asks Skouras about Bo Adams, knowing she is his favorite. To gain favor herself, she outs Zoe as the traitor. Skouras takes Zoe into custody, and, after interrogating her, has Dani wipe her mind clean. Bo and Tate reunite with Winter and Channing at the safe house. Tate tells Bo to tell him whatever she sees in her dreams, no matter the risk.
11	"Revelation"	Steve Shill	Nick Antosca & Bobby Arnot	June 1, 2014	2J7912	4.31
Channing's wound is infected. Bo tells Tate she wants to face Skouras. She is confident she can keep them out of danger, and Tate trusts her instincts. They locate him at a gala, and Bo helps Tate steal a building pass. Once inside, she deactivates the security team's communications and lures Skouras to the penthouse. Tate incapacitates a security guard, and Bo locks the room. She begs Skouras to leave her and her father alone to live their lives. He says he can help them. He tells Bo that Winter caused her mother's death. No longer knowing whom to trust, she leaves with Tate to meet Winter. Meanwhile, Dani learns her health is degrading and that using her power makes it worse. Other Orchestra inmates won't talk about it, but she finds a room with sick telepaths being treated by doctors in hazmat suits. When Skouras returns, she accuses him of willingly endangering her life. She begins to telepathically strangle him, but abruptly leaves. Elsewhere, Channing's condition worsens, and she needs professional medical care. On the way to meeting Winter, Bo manipulates a lightning storm to escape Skouras' henchmen. Despite the hurry to fly Channing to a hospital, Bo won't enter the helicopter, and tells Winter she may not be able to trust him. Flashbacks show him agreeing to a demonstration to secure military funding, leading to Bo's mother developing the same illness as Dani, and eventually dying. Winter says everything he has done for Bo since has been out of remorse and a promise to her mother: she forgives him but won't stay with him. Tate and Bo leave together. Skouras calls Winter to ask for help with a new problem: Dani.
12	"Second Chance"	Frederick E. O. Toye	Jonas Pate & Hans Tobeason	June 15, 2014	2J7913	3.20
Skouras warns Winter about Dani's determination to destroy Bo. Winter reluctantly agrees to help Skouras, but has no idea where Bo and Tate are. They are actually heading to Mexico. Envisioning her mother, Bo learns from a convenience store cashier about Dani's troubled past, when Dani inadvertently killed her own brother after losing control of her powers. Winter's plan to lure Dani using Channing as live bait attracts her to the hideout. Skouras's team fills the room with gas, but she charges out in a rage and attacks Channing and Winter, torturing them to extract Bo's location. She realizes Winter has been tracking Tate's cell phone. At Dani's old home, Bo and Tate find evidence that she did kill her brother. Dani bursts in, slams Tate against a wall, locks him in a room, and grabs Bo. Meanwhile, Skouras heads to Orchestra to wipe clean the hard drives, should public attention be drawn to his project. Dani enters Orchestra with Bo. Tate, Winter and Channing arrive moments later to find Bo and Skouras bound. Dani traps everyone inside. Again, Bo sees her mother, who tells her she can save everyone, including Dani, with kindness. Bo then finds the strength to force open the doors. They all find Dani in the courtyard, surrounded by a tornado of fire. Bo walks through it and tells her that her brother forgives her. Dani extinguishes the flames and collapses from her ailments. Bo touches Dani's cheek and cures Dani. Dani wakes up and is escorted away by Channing. As all of the Orchestra buildings burn Winter tells Bo and Tate to leave immediately, before the police arrive, and that they can never see each other again. After Tate and Bo leave, Skouras tells Winter to go; he will take the blame. Bo and Tate set out for their quiet, peaceful lives.
13	"Perception"	Eric Stoltz	Holly Harold	June 24, 2014 (New Zealand Only)	2J7903	N/A
Bo uses her powers to help a struggling police officer, who is suspected in the disappearance of a young woman and who has powers similar to Bo's. Although a thirteenth episode, entitled "Perception", was never aired in the United States, it was released on 24 June 2014 in New Zealand. The episode was screened in the United Kingdom on 16 July 2014 on Watch. The story takes place after episode 6 (as it continues, then ends, the Shawn arc). The story would also have to take place after episode 7 (since in this episode Bo knows Tate is her father, which is a fact she does not learn until the end of episode 7). In Denmark (on TV 2 Zulu) this episode was in fact shown as episode 8.

== Development and production ==
The series first appeared as part of NBC's development slate in September 2012. In January 2013, NBC green-lit production of a pilot episode. On May 12, 2013, the series was placed on the network's 2013–14 schedule, where it was expected to debut after the 2014 Winter Olympics.

On July 17, 2013, co-creator and executive producer Mark Friedman departed the series. Cuarón stayed on board as executive producer alongside J.J. Abrams. Friedman was ultimately succeeded by Dave Erickson. A few months later, in December, Erickson also stepped down as executive producer/showrunner and was replaced by Jonas Pate, who was serving as a co-executive producer and series director. Pate ran the day-to-day production of the series along with Hans Tobeason, who served as "on-set" producer in New York, where filming took place. To allow a smoother transition for the new showrunners and accommodate script re-writes, production went on hiatus from December 20 to January 6, 2014.

Every scene in the pilot episode is a long take (One of Cuaron's trademarks), but that format was dropped beginning with the second episode.

=== Casting ===
McLaughlin (Tate) was the first regular to be cast in February 2013, followed by Lindo (Winter), Sienna Guillory, Chung (Channing) and ten-year-old newcomer Sequoyah (Bo). MacLachlan was added in March 2013 as was Arian Moayed. In June 2013, Guillory was dropped from the series after the pilot, with producers choosing not to continue with her character, professional hit-woman Moore, going forward. Moayed, whose character Corey was originally conceived to be Moore's right-hand man, was quietly dropped as a series regular after the second episode.

== Reception ==
=== Ratings ===
Viewership and ratings per episode of Believe
No.	Title	Air date	Rating/share (18–49)	Viewers (millions)	DVR (18–49)	DVR viewers (millions)	Total (18–49)	Total viewers (millions)
1	"Pilot"	March 10, 2014	2.7/8	10.56	—N/a	—N/a	—N/a	—N/a
2	"Beginner's Luck"	March 16, 2014	1.5/4	6.57	—N/a	2.84	—N/a	9.41
3	"Origin"	March 23, 2014	1.2/3	5.13	1.0	3.12	2.2	8.25
4	"Defection"	March 30, 2014	1.1/3	4.89	0.9	2.57	2.0	7.46
5	"White Noise"	April 6, 2014	1.0/2	4.25	0.8	2.57	1.8	6.82
6	"Sinking"	April 13, 2014	1.0/3	4.34	0.7	2.54	1.7	6.88
7	"Bang and Blame"	April 20, 2014	1.1/3	4.54	0.7	2.42	1.8	6.96
8	"Together"	April 27, 2014	1.0/3	4.51	0.8	2.42	1.8	6.91
9	"Prodigy"	May 4, 2014	1.0/3	4.33	—N/a	—N/a	—N/a	—N/a
10	"Collapse"	May 25, 2014	0.7/3	2.92	0.6	2.18	1.3	5.10
11	"Revelation"	June 1, 2014	0.9/3	4.31	—N/a	—N/a	—N/a	—N/a
12	"Second Chance"	June 15, 2014	0.7/2	3.20	—N/a	—N/a	—N/a	—N/a

=== Critical reception ===
Believe has received mixed reviews. On Rotten Tomatoes, the show has an approval rating of 39% based on 38 critics, with an average rating of 5.4/10. The website's critics consensus reads, "Haphazardly crafted, Believe has moments of impressive visuals, but its story is merely passable." On Metacritic, it holds an average score of 55 out of 100 based on 25 critics, indicating "mixed or average reviews".

== Broadcast ==
The series premiered in the UK on the Watch channel on March 27, 2014. It airs in Canada on the CTV network, and in Latin America on the Warner Channel. It premiered in Australia on the Nine Network on April 15, 2015.
