= Surface (2005 TV series) =

- intertitle from episode one
- Genre: Science fiction
- Created by: Jonas Pate; Josh Pate
- Starring: Lake Bell; Jay R. Ferguson; Carter Jenkins; Ian Anthony Dale; Leighton Meester; Eddie Hassell; Robert Lubanski; Rade Šerbedžija
- Country of origin: United States
- Original language: English
- No. of seasons: 1
- No. of episodes: 15

Production
- Executive producers: Jonas Pate; Josh Pate
- Producers: Ed Milkovich; Jay Beattie; Darcy Meyers; Lake Bell
- Running time: 43 minutes
- Production companies: Rock Fish Productions; NBC Universal Television Studio

Original release
- Network: NBC
- Release: September 19, 2005 – February 6, 2006

Surface is an American science fiction television series created by Jonas and Josh Pate, that premiered on NBC on September 19, 2005. The program aired ten episodes before going on hiatus on November 28, 2005. It returned for five more episodes on January 2, 2006, and ended its run on February 6.

On May 15, 2006, NBC officially announced that the series had been cancelled after one season.

== Synopsis ==
During a routine submersible dive in the North Pacific Ocean, California oceanographer Laura Daughtery (Lake Bell) is attacked by an unknown life-form that appears out of a field of craters on the ocean's floor. Miles Barnett (Carter Jenkins), a 14-year old North Carolina teenager, finds himself face to face with the strange sea creature after falling off his wakeboard during a nighttime outing with his friends. Meanwhile, Richard Connelly (Jay R. Ferguson), a Louisiana man on a fishing trip, loses his brother in a suspicious diving accident when a creature drags him to the depths of the Gulf of Mexico.

All around the world, strange things are occurring in the world's oceans. Shooting stars fall from the night sky into the Caribbean Sea; a horrific howl tears apart a South African lighthouse. In South Carolina, an unknown carcass washes up on a public beach, prompting the government to evacuate and cordon off the area, claiming it as a beached whale killed by red tide poisoning.

Meanwhile, Daughtery's research is seized by government officials led by a mysterious Croatian scientist, Dr. Aleksander Cirko (Rade Šerbedžija); after attempting to confront them, she is fired. Curious as to what he's seen, Miles ventures back to the area where he first spotted the creature only to find the water covered in strange pods he classifies as "eggs"; he takes one home and places it in his parents' fish tank. Unable to cope with his brother's disappearance, Connely ventures to South Carolina to see the creature for himself. Connelly meets Daughtery upon arrival after they are both taken into custody due to asking too many questions. When the fish in Miles' tank disappear and the tank breaks, Miles discovers that something has hatched from the egg; he attempts to conceal it but it escapes and causes havoc at his sister's pool party. Daughtery and Connelly sneak onto the beach and bring back a hagfish that had been feeding on the carcass. Each returns to their home, and Daughtery sends the fish's stomach contents to be tested. As they wait for the results, reports of strange creatures beaching themselves around the world begin to surface. These three strangers may have stumbled upon the greatest secret in human history.

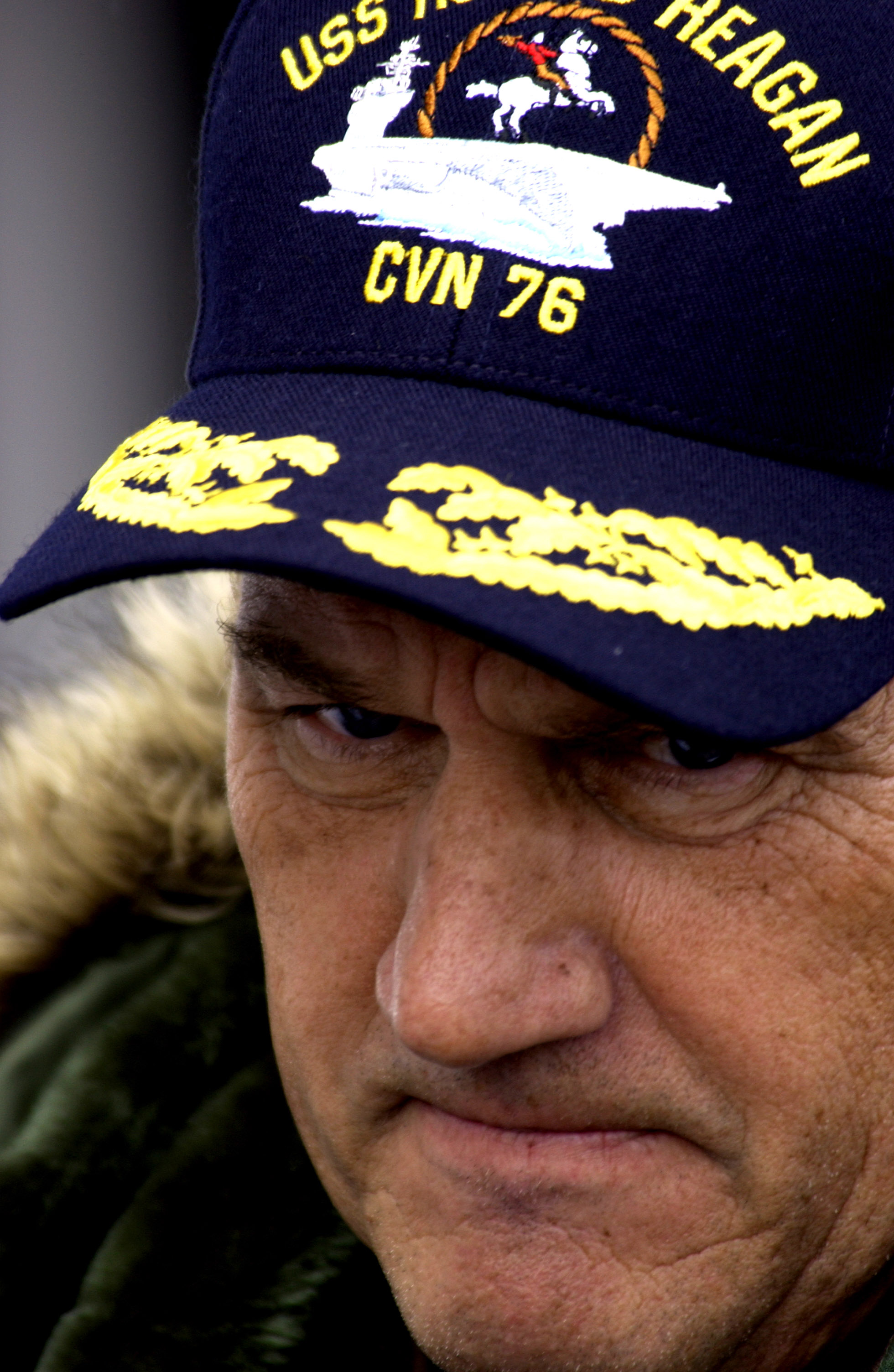
Eric Pierpoint performs in a scene for Surface, on the flight deck of USS Ronald Reagan, March 4, 2005

The creature that hatched from the "egg" Miles found appears to be a kind of web-footed aquatic lizard, possibly a Pliosaur (this is later proven to be false, as the show progresses to reveal that the species were artificially created). It can zap objects with an electrical charge and heal instantaneously. Miles's friend Phil names the creature Nimrod, shortened to "Nim".

Dr. Cirko discovers the origins of the creature, but is murdered before he can tell anyone. His assistant gives his research to Daughtery, who has already teamed up with Connelly.

After some of the other young creatures attack him, Miles develops some of the creatures' abilities- electrical surges and a need for excess salt (as well as some form of communication with the creatures), due to Nim healing him by licking his bites and scratches. In the series finale, the creatures' activities on the sea floor cause a massive earthquake which turns into a tsunami that destroys Puerto Rico and heads toward the east coast. Rich discovers a cryogenic version of Noah's Ark in the Iderdex plant, along with dozens of monorails being sent into the Mariana Trench. The series ends with Miles finally meeting Laura and Rich during the evacuation. The last shot is of Miles, Laura, Rich, and Caitlin looking out from the church steeple that they had climbed to escape the waves to see how the tsunami has placed all of Wilmington, NC under water.

== Themes ==
This TV series encompasses possible implications of genetic engineering, and modern biotechnology. The underlying theme of the series involves the artificial creation of an organism, through a secret biotechnological company. One scene in episode #113 involves a scientist (Dr. Morris) going for an interview for the company, where the interviewer reveals revelations such as the recovery of the Archaeopteryx, and that cloning Dolly the Sheep was 30 years after their secret company discovered how to clone.

== Cast and characters ==
=== Main ===
- Lake Bell as Laura Daughtery
- Jay R. Ferguson as Richard Connelly
- Carter Jenkins as Miles Barnett
- Ian Anthony Dale as Davis Lee
- Leighton Meester as Savannah Barnett
- Eddie Hassell as Phil Nance

=== Recurring ===
- Rade Šerbedžija as Dr. Aleksander Cirko
- Linsey Godfrey as Caitlin Blum
- Kelly Collins Lintz as Tracy Connelly
- Ric Reitz as Ron Barnett
- Louanne Cooper as Sylvia Barnett
- Bobby Coleman as Jesse Daughtery
- Daniel Newman as Greg Butler
- Jason Davis as Sean

== Episodes ==
No.	Title	Directed by	Written by	Original release date
1	"There's Something Strange Going on in the World's Oceans"	Josh Pate, Jonas Pate	Josh Pate, Jonas Pate	September 19, 2005
People all over the world experience bizarre encounters involving strange new creatures in the oceans. Among those people are Laura Daughtery, a marine biologist and single mother working in California, Richard Connelly, a Louisiana family man fishing in the Gulf of Mexico, and Miles Bennett, a North Carolina teen who finds and hatches one of the creatures' eggs.
2	"The Mystery of the Ocean Is Now on Land"	Jeffrey Reiner	Josh Pate	September 26, 2005
After a mysterious animal carcass is discovered on the shore of Sullivan's Island, Laura and Rich head there to look for some answers but instead get detained for questioning. Also, a team of scientists face a hazardous autopsy of the deceased creature. Meanwhile, Miles decides to name his new discovery Nimrod but faces panic and trouble when Savannah throws a party at which point Nimrod ends up escaping.
3	"Things Are Heating Up Under the Ocean"	Aaron Lipstadt	Jonas Pate	October 3, 2005
The phenomenon becomes more widespread as similar creatures wreak havoc on the coast of Texas. Laura gets more upset with the government, especially after she loses her job, while Rich still has a difficult time getting over the loss of his brother as he starts to hear his voice in the water. Cirko and Lee find startling information that may link the creatures to global warming when they begin to dig under the ocean bed. Meanwhile, Miles discovers that it's not safe to raise Nimrod in the backyard when lightning strikes.
4	"It Is Time to Track These Unidentified Species"	Félix Enríquez Alcalá	David Greenwalt	October 10, 2005
Laura and Jackson head out to sea, where she ends up using a GPS device to track one of the creatures. Rich finds proof that the sinkholes in his visions are real, causing him to continue obsessing over his brother's death. Meanwhile, Lee tries to talk Cirko out of telling the Pentagon that the new species should be considered extremely dangerous.
5	"Who Turned Out the Lights"	Jeff Woolnough	Jason Cahill	October 17, 2005
Laura and Richard reunite and use a GPS device to track one of the creatures to a local pier in California, while Cirko and Lee consider asking Laura to join them in their investigation. Richard's wife believes he is cheating on her. Meanwhile, Miles and Phil fight to keep Nimrod a secret when suspicious Animal Control officers search for a missing neighborhood dog.
6	"Another One Bites the Dust"	Sergio Mimica-Gezzan	Josh Pate	October 24, 2005
Cirko's life is in danger after he discovers the origin of the mysterious new species. Laura and Rich begin to fear for their own safety when they come into possession of a much sought-after sea orchid. Miles sneaks Nimrod out of the house when his parents realize that he's been secretly keeping the animal as a pet.
7	"On the Run"	Rick Wallace	Chip Johannessen	November 7, 2005
Jackson comes to Laura and Rich's aid after they find that Laura's home has been broken into. After Nimrod accidentally injures a man from animal control, Miles gets in trouble with the law in his attempt to free Nimrod. He steals a car and takes Nimrod to the ocean, where he releases him. Lee discusses Cirko and the creatures with his superiors.
8	"Submersible Setback"	John Behring	Dan Dworkin, Jay Beattie	November 14, 2005
Jackson helps Laura and Rich build a submersible so that they can visit a site where the creatures spawn. Meanwhile, the Bennetts consider boot camp as a way to discipline Miles. Ultimately Miles ends up working at the aquarium instead, as his sister is sympathetic to his plight and convinces her parents not to punish him because he truly cared about Nimrod.
9	"Race Against Time"	Bill Eagles	Thomas Wheeler	November 21, 2005
Trapped in the submersible, Laura fears survival is impossible while Rich begins to hallucinate. Miles worries about Nimrod when he hears and sees trouble at the marine docks. Phil helps Miles look for Nimrod, but instead they discover more of the creatures and Miles is bitten.
10	"Laura and Rich Return from Plunge to the Ocean Floor - With No Boat in Sight"	Jeffrey Reiner	Darcy Meyers	November 28, 2005
Laura and Rich are in for another shock when they leave the ocean floor and return to the surface, where they find Jackson gone and are trapped on a sinking raft before they are eventually rescued by a helicopter. Meanwhile, Savannah suspects that Nimrod's responsible for Miles ending up in the hospital. Miles nearly dies from his wounds before Nimrod unexpectedly heals him, but security attacks and kills Nimrod.
11	"The Story's Out."	Michael Robison	Jay Beattie, Dan Dworkin	January 2, 2006
Rich and Laura sneak out of the hospital with the creature footage before Lee and his men can get to them. Upon their escape Rich and Laura take the footage to tape to a copying service company in an effort to upload it onto the Internet and convince a news station to run a piece about the footage. Meanwhile, Miles is sad and defeated while he watches doctors preparing to perform an autopsy on Nim, but that all changes when Nim sneezes and they realize he is still alive. Scientists study Nim, much to Miles's dismay. The video shown on the news is dismissed as a phony.
12	"Fugitives on the Run"	Marita Grabiak	Chip Johannessen	January 9, 2006
Laura and Rich become fugitives and are being pursued by Lee and his legion of secret agents. While hiding out, Laura has a bizarre Internet exchange with a mysterious person who claims to have information about the origin of the creatures. Meanwhile, Miles and Caitlin go to a bonfire party at the beach and are stunned when two of her friends mysteriously disappear after a late-night swim. The next day the Coast Guard makes a grisly discovery.
13	"Experiment Gone Awry"	Brad Anderson	Jonas Pate	January 23, 2006
After it's revealed to Laura that a cadre of top scientists created this new species, she wakes up in a field after being drugged, and Rich comes to her rescue. Fearing the end of the world, Laura and Rich are determined to find the mysterious corporation that funded this experiment gone awry, but nothing could prepare them for what they discover in an abandoned laboratory along the way. Meanwhile, Miles joins Bloom and his crew of aquarium workers on a boat excursion to find the egg field containing thousands of unhatched creatures. Surprisingly, Miles later agrees to help law enforcement find Nim. A mob goes after the creatures and are nearly slaughtered, but Miles, with the help of Nim and his new powers, leads the creatures back into the ocean.
14	"Fears Are Rising"	Jean de Segonzac	Jay Beattie, Dan Dworkin	January 30, 2006
The strands of the conspiracy begin to come together after Rich and Laura kidnap Lee. Miles returns home after the confrontation on the beach. He is feared because of having become different and gets into a fight, injuring a boy with his powers. A distraught Laura goes to see her son and is apprehended by Lee and his goons while Richard is captured at an Iderdex lab in Wilmington. Lee releases Laura and fakes her death, saying that "the cat's out of the bag" and thus it doesn't matter what she does anymore. In the aftermath of the fight, Miles and his family are confronted by the police and a throng of angry townspeople, who are suffering because of the creatures and are therefore treating Miles as a scapegoat. But as the townspeople go after him, there is word of a tsunami on the way and everyone flees.
15	"Who Will Be Left Behind"	Jeffrey Reiner	Josh Pate	February 6, 2006
With a tsunami approaching the coast, the residents of Wilmington find themselves under a mandatory evacuation. Rich is trapped in the lab after mysteriously finding a picture of the missing Jackson on a computer, but Laura arrives and manages to rescue him. At the same time, Caitlin is knocked out trying to reach Miles and doesn't make it to the ferry in time, so Miles goes after her. He finds her and they race for safety in his parents' car and encounter Laura and Rich on the way. The four head for an open drawbridge, but the car runs out of gas and the tsunami is quickly approaching, so they dash into a church and to the roof of the steeple as the tsunami hits and the creatures invade the church. There, the group is reunited with Nimrod and look out upon the completely flooded town, causing Laura to comment that "it is a new world."

== Home media ==
On May 1, 2006 it was announced that Universal Studios Home Entertainment would be releasing the Surface - Season One DVD set on August 15, 2006. The DVD set was released with the title of Surface: The Complete Series. The complete series was released in Australia on April 4, 2007.

DVD name	Region 1	Region 2	Region 4
The Complete Series	August 15, 2006	March 26, 2007	April 4, 2007

== International distribution ==
=== Broadcast history ===
During the show's initial airing, Surface was also broadcast in syndication on the Sci-Fi Channel in the United States. In addition to American network the programme was also broadcast in Canada on CH, as well as ITV2 in the UK, Network Ten in Australia, VT4 in Belgium, on La Sexta and Calle 13 in Spain and on Universal Channel in Mexico. During the summer of 2006, the series was broadcast on ProSieben in Germany, by Fox on Portuguese and Brazilian cable networks, in Israel on Yes network, and on Canal+ in most of Scandinavia. During the summer of 2008, the series was broadcast on Veronica in The Netherlands. The entire series was repeated in the UK on ITV1 between 23 July 2009 and 30 October 2009.

Surface was subsequently broadcast in Italy on Italia 1 and in Norway on TVNorge (started in June 2007), Portugal on TVI on Saturday afternoons, Australia on Network Ten on Sundays, 6.30pm, reruns on Sci Fi Channel (Australia), Spain on La Sexta (started in September 2007), Finland on MTV3, rebroadcast in Germany on ProSieben and in Canada on Space. In July 2007, the series was also being broadcast in Mauritius on MBC3 on Tuesday afternoons. In Poland on TVN Siedem broadcast the series starting in August 2007, and starting May 2008, it was repeated on TVN. Starting in November 2007, it was broadcast in Greece on Alter Channel on Fridays at 21:00, in New Zealand on TV3 late Friday evenings, and in Croatia (Hrvatska) on RTL Televizija Wednesday at 22:30. The series was shown in March 2008 on StarWorld in Singapore, with repeats airing the next day at 11:00. On December 10, 2008, Surface would later be broadcast on Digit Alb + in Albania.

=== List of broadcasters ===
- Albania: Digitalb
- Argentina: Canal 13, (Mon-Fri, from March 2009)
- Australia: Network Ten, Sci Fi Channel
- Belgium: RTL-TVI
- Brazil: Rede Record, Universal Channel
- Canada: CH, Space
- Colombia: Citytv Bogotá
- Croatia: RTL Televizija (Croatian title: Stvorenja)
- Chile: Red TV
- Denmark: Canal+, DR1
- Dominican Republic: Teleantillas (Canal 2)
- France: Canal+, TF1
- Finland: Canal+, Sub, MTV3
- Germany: ProSieben, kabel eins (German title: Surface - Unheimliche Tiefe)
- Greece: Alter (Greek title: Άγνωστος Εχθρός)
- Hungary: TV2
- India: Star World (from 2008)
- Israel: yesSTARS
- Italy: Fox, Italia 1
- Latvia: TV6
- Lithuania: TV6
- Malaysia: TV3
- Mauritius: MBC3
- Mexico: Universal Channel
- New Zealand: TV3 (from 2007)
- Netherlands: Veronica (from May 2008)
- North Macedonia: Kanal 5 (Macedonian title: Суштества)
- Norway: Canal+ and Tvnorge (from 2007)
- Paraguay: Canal 9 SNT
- Peru: America TV
- Poland: Canal+ Poland, TVN Siedem and TVN (Polish title: Na powierzchni - On the Surface)
- Portugal: TVI, Fox
- Russia: Channel One
- Romania: Antena 1
- Saudi Arabia: ShowSeries 1
- Serbia: RTS 2
- Singapore: StarWorld Ch18, Starhub Cable (Mon-Fri, from March 10, 2008)
- Slovenia: Supernova, POP TV
- Slovak Republic: STV 1 (Mon-Fri, from Sept. 2008)
- Spain: laSexta
- Sri Lanka: DialogTV
- Sweden: Canal+, tv400
- Turkey: Dizimax
- Ukraine: 1+1
- United Kingdom: ITV1 (Thursdays from 23 July 2009 until 30 October 2009), ITV2 (all subsequent episodes, with the exception of the pilot being first shown on ITV1)
- United States: NBC, UniversalHD
