= Pantherama! =

- Friday Night Lights episode
- Episode no.: Season 2 Episode 7
- Directed by: David Boyd
- Written by: Bridget Carpenter
- Cinematography by: Todd McMullen
- Editing by: Stephen Michael
- Original release date: November 16, 2007
- Running time: 43 minutes

Guest appearances
- Austin Nichols as Noah Barnett; Jessalyn Gilsig as Shelley Hayes; Daniella Alonso as Carlotta Alonso; Brad Leland as Buddy Garrity; Benny Ciaramello as Santiago Herrera; Jana Kramer as Noelle Davenport; Kim Smith as Lauren Davis; Brooke Langton as Jackie Miller; Dana Wheeler-Nicholson as Angela Collette

Episode chronology
← Previous "How Did I Get Here"	Next → "Seeing Other People"
- Friday Night Lights (season 2)

"Pantherama!" is the seventh episode of the second season of the American sports drama television series Friday Night Lights, inspired by the 1990 nonfiction book by H. G. Bissinger. It is the 29th overall episode of the series and was written by supervising producer Bridget Carpenter and directed by David Boyd. It originally aired on NBC on November 16, 2007.

The series is set in the fictional town of Dillon, a small, close-knit community in rural West Texas. It follows a high school football team, the Dillon Panthers. It features a set of characters, primarily connected to Coach Eric Taylor, his wife Tami, and their daughter Julie. In the episode, as Dillon prepares for Pantherama, Eric faces problems with Smash and Santiago. Meanwhile, Julie is introduced to a new teacher, while Matt bonds with Carlotta.

According to Nielsen Media Research, the episode was seen by an estimated 5.96 million household viewers and gained a 2.1 ratings share among adults aged 18–49. The episode received mixed-to-positive reviews from critics, who praised Smash's subplot, but some felt that the episode's pacing was rushed and under-developed.

== Plot ==
The Panthers prepare to meet with potential recruiters for other schools, but Eric (Kyle Chandler) tells them to focus primarily on training. During this, Tim (Taylor Kitsch) decides to leave his house when Billy (Derek Phillip) and Jackie (Brooke Langton) spend time together. He convinces Tyra (Adrianne Palicki) in allowing him to stay, but she only gives him two days to find a new place.

Tami (Connie Britton) assigns Tyra and Lyla (Minka Kelly) to be in charge of the entertainment section of the "Pantherama", a yearly charity event for the football team. For this, Tyra and Lyla get the team to practice dancing. When Eric sends Santiago (Benny Ciaramello) for check-up, Tami finds that Santiago lives alone, as his uncle has not come home in almost a year. Tami wants to prioritize Santiago's home life before allowing to play, so Buddy (Brad Leland) decides to allow Santiago to live with him. Even with Tami's concerns, Buddy states that he can take care of Santiago.

Seeing Matt (Zach Gilford) kissing Lauren (Kim Smith) in the hallway, Julie (Aimee Teegarden) gets into a classroom with her journalism teacher Noah Barnett (Austin Nichols). Noah understands Julie's predicament and consoles her, helping her in writing an article about Pantherama. Matt, meanwhile, starts bonding out with Carlotta (Daniella Alonso) at home when she teaches him to dance for Pantherama. Smash (Gaius Charles) starts accepting meetings with potential recruiters. One of these, Whitmore University, offers a full scholarship. While his mother likes the offer, Smash is not interested, as the school's football team is very poor and not suitable for his professional career. Corrina (Liz Mikel) is angered by Smash's decision, as she cares about his education.

After Pantherama, Matt thanks Carlotta for her help. He then kisses her, surprising her. Corrina visits Eric, asking him to watch over Smash, feeling that the lack of a father figure may cloud his judgment. Eric interrupts a meeting that Smash set up with another recruiter, telling him he is talented but that he needs to protect his own future. After Tyra kicks him out, Tim accepts to live in a rented apartment with a friend of Tyra's sister. Santiago is introduced to Buddy's apartment, and settles into his new bedroom.

== Production ==
=== Development ===
In October 2007, NBC announced that the seventh episode of the season would be titled "Pantherama!". The episode was written by supervising producer Bridget Carpenter, and directed by David Boyd. This was Carpenter's third writing credit, and Boyd's fourth directing credit.

== Reception ==
=== Audience viewership ===
In its original American broadcast, "Pantherama!" was seen by an estimated 5.96 million household viewers with a 2.1 in the 18–49 demographics. This means that 2.1 percent of all households with televisions watched the episode. It finished 72nd out of 101 programs airing from November 12–18, 2007. This was a 7% increase in viewership from the previous episode, which was watched by an estimated 5.56 million household viewers with a 1.9 in the 18–49 demographics.

=== Critical response ===
"Pantherama!" received mixed-to-positive reviews from critics. Eric Goldman of IGN gave the episode a "good" 7.8 out of 10 and wrote, "Though he'd gotten a couple of good scenes here and there, Smash has been sorely lacking in his own storylines this season. That was remedied this week, with an episode focusing on recruiting time beginning and what that means for a hot commodity like Smash. This was also an episode with several strong points mixed with several storylines that felt rushed through."

Scott Tobias of The A.V. Club gave the episode a "B" grade and wrote, "For me, it doesn't matter if the situation is a bit expected; what matters is how well it's dramatized. And for the most part, the Smash thread was pretty satisfactory, partly because our boy doesn't quite fit the mold of an egomaniacal, me-first recruit." Ken Tucker of Entertainment Weekly wrote, "I guess I liked the episode more than I first thought: more like 70% very good, 30% lame. Which is still a helluva lot better than I can say for the two shows that flank Lights."

Alan Sepinwall wrote, "I've been complaining about the Landry storyline for weeks, and yet last night's episode – about 95% manslaughter angst-free – was maybe my least favorite of the season. If it hadn't been for the Smash subplot, which was repetitive but thematically on point, it might have been completely forgettable." Leah Friedman of TV Guide wrote, "Move over man-slut Matt Saracen. You've been replaced in my heart by Santiago. How sad, how ridiculously heartbreakingly sad was that look on his face in the very last shot? It just hurt to watch."

Andrew Johnston of Slant Magazine wrote, "'Pantherama!' is a perfectly servicable episode of Friday Night Lights, accompanied though it may be by a faint whiff of filler." Rick Porter of Zap2it wrote, "See what happens, Friday Night Lights, when you forget about the Incident and you let the stories of your characters and their regular lives take center stage? You get maybe the best episode of the season, is what you get."

Brett Love of TV Squad wrote, "my favorite scene of the night was actually the meeting between Eric and Mrs. Williams. Her line about Smash not having a father was perfect. "I'm not asking you to be this boy's daddy. I'm just here to remind you, he doesn't have one." Great stuff. And it got the appropriate reaction from Eric as he is now paying Smash's recruitment the attention that he should have from the start." Television Without Pity gave the episode a "C+" grade.
