= Blood & Oil =

American television series

- Genre: Soap opera
- Created by: Josh Pate; Rodes Fishburne
- Starring: Don Johnson; Chace Crawford; Rebecca Rittenhouse; Scott Michael Foster; Amber Valletta; India de Beaufort; Adan Canto; Miranda Rae Mayo; Delroy Lindo
- Composer: Mark Isham
- Country of origin: United States
- Original language: English
- No. of seasons: 1
- No. of episodes: 10

Production
- Executive producers: Tony Krantz; Don Johnson; Robert Sertner; Jonas Pate; Jon Harmon Feldman; Josh Pate
- Producers: Louis G. Friedman; Drew Comins
- Production locations: Salt Lake City, Utah; Ogden, Utah
- Cinematography: Shelly Johnson; John Aronson
- Editor: Casey Brown
- Running time: 43 minutes
- Production companies: ABC Signature; Flame Ventures

Original release
- Network: ABC
- Release: September 27 – December 13, 2015

Blood & Oil is an American prime time television soap opera created by Josh Pate and Rodes Fishburne, that premiered on ABC on September 27, 2015. The series follows a young couple that moves to fictitious Rock Springs, North Dakota, after the biggest oil discovery in American history.

The series features an ensemble cast headed by Don Johnson as oil tycoon Harlan "Hap" Briggs. Blood & Oil also stars Amber Valletta as his catty socialite wife, Carla; Scott Michael Foster as his villainous son Wick; and Miranda Rae Mayo as his illegitimate biracial daughter Lacey who has an affair with Hap's personal driver, AJ Menendez (Adan Canto), who leads a triple life. Chace Crawford and Rebecca Rittenhouse play young couple Billy and Cody LeFever, while India de Beaufort plays bar owner/loan shark Jules Jackman, and Delroy Lindo plays a sly sheriff, Tip Harrison.

The original order of 13 episodes was reduced to 10 on October 23, 2015.

== Production ==
=== Development ===
The project was written by Josh Pate and Rodes Fishburne, with Tony Krantz as executive producer. In September 2011, ABC bought the script (then titled The Bakken) along with several other projects by Krantz, but did not order a pilot for the 2012–13 television season. In October 2014, the project moved to the USA Network under the title Boom and would be produced by ABC, but was never filmed.

On January 30, 2015, it was announced that the project had returned to ABC and had been picked up as pilot, which was filmed in Northern Utah and was directed by Jonas Pate. On May 7, 2015, ABC picked up the pilot to series (still untitled). By May 27, 2015, the title was Oil. On June 1, 2015, it was reported that Cynthia Cidre had been hired as executive producer and co-showrunner of the project, now titled Blood & Oil. On August 5, 2015, it was announced that Cidre would be replaced by Jon Harmon Feldman as showrunner, after the production ran into problems due "to its big scope".

=== Casting ===
Casting advertising began in February 2015. Scott Michael Foster landed the role of rich kid Wick. Rebecca Rittenhouse and India de Beaufort were cast in the main female roles. On March 9, it was announced that Don Johnson had landed the leading role as the family patriarch and most powerful man in the town; Johnson is also the series' executive producer. Delroy Lindo was to co-star as the town sheriff. On March 11, Chace Crawford joined the series as a main protagonist, while Yani Gellman and Caitlin Carver were cast as regulars. On March 12, Amber Valletta landed the role of Hap's new wife.

After the pilot was picked up to series ABC started making casting changes. On May 26, 2015, it was announced that Caitlin Carver and Yani Gellman, cast as Lacey Briggs and A.J. Menendez respectively, would leave the show and their roles would be recast. On July 6, 2015, it was announced that Adan Canto would play the role of A.J. Menendez, replacing Gellman. On July 20, 2015, it was announced that Aurora Perrineau had replaced Caitlin Carver in the role of Lacey; the character was changed from white to biracial, since Hap fathered her out of wedlock. On August 4, 2015, Miranda Rae Mayo replaced Perrineau as Lacey, due to the character's being reconceived to be a bit older.

Several actors were cast in the recurring roles. Yaani King and Keston John were cast as Ada and Kess Eze. On August 21, 2015, it was announced that Wilson Bethel had joined the series as Finn, Eze's business partner. On August 24, 2015, Tara Karsian was cast as local waitress Van Ness. On October 7, 2015, it was revealed that Lolita Davidovich joined the series as Annie Briggs, Hap's ex-wife.

== Cast and characters ==
=== Regular cast ===
- Don Johnson as Harlan "Hap" Briggs
- Chace Crawford as Billy LeFever
- Rebecca Rittenhouse as Cody LeFever
- Scott Michael Foster as Wick Briggs
- Amber Valletta as Carla Briggs
- India de Beaufort as Jules Jackman
- Miranda Rae Mayo as Lacey Briggs
- Adan Canto as Ahmed "A.J." Menendez
- Delroy Lindo as Tip Harrison

=== Recurring cast ===
- Barry Corbin as Clifton Lundegren
- Peyton List as Emma Lundegren
- Paul Rae as Garry Laframboise
- Keston John as Kess Eze
- Yaani King as Ada Eze
- Wilson Bethel as Finn
- Tara Karsian as Van Ness
- Lolita Davidovich as Annie Briggs

== Episodes ==
No.	Title	Directed by	Written by	Original release date	US viewers (millions)
1	"Pilot"	Jonas Pate	Josh Pate & Rodes Fishburne	September 27, 2015	6.36
Billy and Cody LeFever move to Rock Springs, North Dakota, where there is a rush for new huge oil fields. They dream of getting their piece of the pie, but they have a difficult start. When Cody finds out she is pregnant, she wants to return home. Carla, the wife of oil baron Hap Briggs, finds out from her political contacts that a section of the Bakken oil field once thought barren is actually abundant. At her new job in the pharmacy, Cody overhears that Hap is buying the McCutching Ranch, from where he wants to drill into the field which is under protected Native American land. Billy convinces Cody to stay in town a little longer, and he borrows money to buy a lot from Clifton Lundgren that provides the only access to the ranch. Their gamble pays off, and they make their first million leasing the lot to Briggs, while Billy also negotiates a 5% stake in the McCutching oil revenues. Hap cuts off his troublesome son, Wick. As revenge, Wick plots with Garry to steal a truckload of oil from his father. Hap catches the two, but they are wearing masks.
2	"The Ripple Effect"	Jonas Pate	Josh Pate	October 4, 2015	5.27
Wick's oil robbery causes a rig fire. Hap puts a reward on the siphoners. To avoid being reported, Wick and his accomplice Garry visit a potential customer. The customer thinks it's safer just to turn them in to get the reward that is being offered, so Garry comes back later murders him. Hap's daughter (Wick's half-sister), Lacey, arrives from Los Angeles, and reconnects with AJ. Cody wants to buy a house to escape from the roughnecks at the motel, while Billy wants to become a partner in Hap's business. They do not have the money for both, so they decide in favor of the house. Hap asks Jules, with whom he was romantically involved before meeting Carla, to stay away from his son.
3	"Hustle and Flow"	Rod Holcomb	Matt Pyken	October 11, 2015	3.91
Hap offers a claim that has already detected oil to Wick, and later allows Billy a chance to also buy into the claim, much to Wick's chagrin. Hap secretly meets with Jules to discuss her anger over him leaving for New York and coming back married to Carla. Hap tries to kiss Jules, but she shuns him. AJ runs out on Lacey to meet with a mysterious woman who wants him to get soil samples. Tip and a deputy tail the oil tanker that Garry is trying to run out of town, but Garry runs them off the road. Tip later catches up to Garry in a bar and arrests him. Garry calls Wick from jail, asking Wick to get him out or he will start talking. Cody invests in a food truck business, which will be run by Kess and Ada along with a chef named Finn. Billy tries to buy into the claim that Hap offered with his remaining $250,000, but Hap says the minimum buy-in is $500,000. Desperate, Billy offers back his 5% stake in the McCutching claim in addition to the $250,000, which Hap accepts. The new claim turns out to be no more than a pressure spike, which spurts oil for a few seconds and then dies off. Hap later confides in Wick that he learned a few weeks ago the new claim would likely be a bust, and only offered it to his son to lure in Billy and get his 5% McCutching claim back. He says his real plan is to have Wick help run the McCutching claim, but says his son must be "all-in" to do so...meaning he must break up with Jules.
4	"The Birthday Party"	Mikael Salomon	Story by : Robert Rovner; Teleplay by : Robert Rovner & Cynthia Cidre	October 18, 2015	3.50
AJ meets with the mysterious woman again, who pushes him to retrieve maps of oil-rich plots she has heard that Hap has. AJ returns and romances Lacey while plotting against the Briggs. Billy approaches Clifton, saying he now understands how evil Hap is, and tries to get Clifton to help him get revenge, but Clifton shuns him. Later, Clifton's granddaughter Emma approaches Billy and says her grandpa had a change of heart. The three try to use Clifton's remaining $100,000 to invest in a small plot Clifton has discovered is a "sure thing", but just as they are about to win the auction for the plot, an online bid from Hap comes in that is significantly higher. Elsewhere, Wick holds a birthday party for Jules at the Briggs home, defying his father's orders to break up with her. Having been contacted by Garry, who says he needs a car and cash to disappear and keep quiet, Wick steals the money that Carla had laid out for the caterers. At the party, AJ sneaks off to download the map files, but is caught by Lacey and Hap. Lacey has already figured out AJ is feeding information to a rival oil company. Rather than punish AJ, Hap gives him a micro-drive with false map files to give to his source, saying, "you work for me now". Hap then tells his daughter not to return to college, saying he needs someone with her intelligence working for him immediately.
5	"Rocks and Hard Places"	Michael Nankin	Story by : Jon Harmon Feldman; Teleplay by : Jessica Queller	October 25, 2015	3.77
During Cody's ultrasound, she and Billy learn that they will have a son. Billy vows to provide security for his family and goes back to Clifton with an idea to invest in tanker trucks, but Emma says her grandfather had a heart attack. They visit Clifton in the hospital, who has decided he is too old for wildcatting, but he does offer Billy some advice. He says for Billy to beat Hap Briggs, he has to "be Hap Briggs". Hap visits Tip, and gets Tip to reveal that Wick "knows more than he's saying" about the night of the tanker robbery. Garry crashes his car, and later shows up at a job site with his arm in a sling, blackmailing Wick for money and pain pills. Wick goes to Tip to turn in Garry for murder, claiming he himself had nothing to do with it, but Garry is blackmailing him anyway. They set up a sting and try to get Garry to admit to the murder while Wick's car is miked, but it goes wrong and Garry flees again. Finn kisses Ada, who eventually backs off and says she can't have an affair. Finn later finds out that Kess has lost all their food business earnings playing black jack at an Indian casino. Cody visits Jules, and discovers that Jules is having an affair with Hap. She tells this only to Billy, who immediately tries to use it to get his 5% back from Hap, but Hap calls his bluff and Billy decides not to tell Carla. Carla, however, figures out why Billy was there, and confronts Hap about who the other woman is. Jules finds out through Hap that Cody told Billy her secret, and is furious with Cody. Cody in turn gets mad at Billy and shuns her own housewarming party, staying late at the pharmacy instead. Garry shows up as she is closing the pharmacy, steals money from the till, and then attacks her after requesting pain pills and not getting what he wants. Billy shows up as Garry is leaving, and finds a bloodied Cody on the floor.
6	"Convergence"	Chris Grismer	Jon Harmon Feldman	November 1, 2015	3.25
Hap, Wick and several others arrive at the hospital to support Billy while Cody is in surgery. Hap calls in his personal surgeon, who saves Cody's life but is unable to save the baby. When she wakes, Cody picks Garry out of a photo lineup that Tip has provided. Billy recognizes the name as one of Wick's acquaintances, and becomes furious. Carla visits Jules to confront her over the affair with Hap, but Jules insists she and Hap are over. AJ's family is again threatened by his contact that works for the Saudi oil company, as the woman wants to know why Hap bought a ranch over a field known to be barren. Hap and AJ conjure up a plan to doctor maps showing that the McCutching ranch claim is for natural gas only. Satisfied, AJ's contact lets him speak to his son. Back at the hospital, Billy thanks Hap for helping save Cody's life. Hap offers Billy a job, which Emma overhears. Meanwhile, Wick has run off to Garry's family cabin to confront him. Billy arrives, having tailed Wick, and vows revenge against the man who killed his unborn son. Garry flees to the woods. While being chased, he falls down an embankment and is impaled by a sharp tree branch. Billy and Wick leave him there to die, vowing to take their secret to the grave. Emma visits Clifton in his hospital room, explaining that Hap wants to hire Billy. Clifton says Billy has the smarts to be a wildcatter and get back at Hap, but needs capital. He then calls someone who has money and also wants to hurt Hap -- Hap's ex-wife Annie.
7	"Fight or Flight"	Cherie Nowlan	Robert Rovner & Dana Ledoux Miller	November 8, 2015	3.40
FBI agents bring Wick to the police station, asking if he knows anything about geological maps that have gone missing from a Federal office and hinting they can put pressure on him if he doesn't cooperate. Wick blows them off, then visits Jules. She shows him the duffel bag and ski mask she found, and confronts him about the night of the oil truck theft. Wick says he was angry and never meant to hurt anyone, and insists he is a changed man, but Jules breaks up with him anyway. Hap is going into damage control mode with the heat from the Feds on him, and he tasks Carla, Lacey and AJ to fnd any employees with skeletons that the FBI might be able to leverage. He then sends Wick on a trip to Williston to get him out of the way while he visits Jules. Carla figures out that Jules called Hap, and sends Wick to Jules' bar under false pretenses where Wick catches Jules and his dad kissing. Joggers find Garry's impaled body, but miraculously he is still alive. He is brought to the hospital where Cody spots him. She wonders if Billy had anything to do with it. Billy has told Cody he is going to work for Hap, but instead flies to Houston with Emma Lundegren to meet with Annie Briggs. Thinking that Annie will back them, the two are disappointed to find she has changed her mind, causing Billy to confront Annie over her motives. Ada has found out that Kess is gambling again and is selling drugs out of the food truck. She asks Cody for advice and Cody suggests they get out of North Dakota, saying the place "changes people". Billy shows up at Hap's office the next day, with Annie arriving shortly after. Annie and Billy announce they have purchased property that will allow them to compete with Briggs Oil. Hap says he welcomes the challenge and assures them he will win. Meanwhile, Wick has decided to cooperate with the FBI.
8	"Rats, Bugs and Moles"	Brian Kelly	Robert Rovner & Matt Pyken	November 29, 2015	3.20
Garry wakes up in the hospital and shouts Billy's name. Sheriff Harrison tells Hap the FBI has an informant that is placed highly in Briggs' company but he does not know who. Sheriff Harrison questions Billy over Garry's words and Cody overhears. Hap invites his company's top brass to his home to find out which one is the mole, while Wick is present with a wire the FBI made him wear. Wick manages to get rid of the wire but AJ finds it and tells Lacy. Carla tells the commissioner to inform the Feds it was one of the Briggs family who stole the report. At the hospital, Billy contemplates murdering Garry but Sheriff Harrison interrupts him. Wick tries to get immunity for Billy from the FBI. Jules apologizes to Wick for being unfaithful and Wick asks her to help him get evidence of Hap's illegal activities by switching out his phone for a bugged, cloned phone. After complying, Jules tells Wick she loves him and he rejects her. Hap hosts an anniversary party. Garry wakes up once again and Cody tells him he made her miscarry and Garry tells her what Billy did, and after confronting him he lies to her. Carla is informed the mole is at the party and tries to convince Hap to throw one of his kids under the table and Hap threatens her with divorce. Sheriff Harrison informs Billy and Cody that Garry died. AJ tells Annie, Hap's ex-wife, that Wick is the mole. The phone bug picks up Carla and the commissioner arguing and the FBI get evidence she paid for the stolen report and arrest her, insulting Hap's honor by taking her out through the party. Cody moves in with Jules to get away from Billy for a while only to find her collapsed on the floor of an apparent drug overdose.
9	"The Art of the Deal"	Tim Hunter	Rodes Fishburne & Pierluigi D. Cothran	December 6, 2015	3.23
In prison, Hap meets Carla and they ponder who planted the bug and at home he finds it in his phone and suspects Jules. Billy gives Cody flowers to make up and she asks for more time. Annie is revealed to be in control of an FBI agent pursuing Hap. Jules tells Hap of her and Wick's involvement in planting the bug and Hap tells Wick he's a disappointment. Sheriff Harrison informs Hap that his son has immunity given by the FBI and thus is guilty of the rig heist. Wick joins Annie's gang of Billy and Emma in their oil venture. Hap tells Lacey that Wick is guilty and she does not believe him. Annie obtains the recording the FBI has on Carla and uses it to threaten her. Cody is upset when she meets Emma for the first time in her house with Wick. Carla gets out of prison and Hap gets suspicious. Both Hap and Annie need to get a Native American chief's permission to buy her reserve's mineral rights and find each other meeting her, but she delays making a choice until her son arrives. Cody flirts with a doctor at a bar while out with Jules and Billy tries to make amends but they fight and she takes a walk. Meanwhile at the bar Emma kisses Billy and he kisses her back and Cody sees. Chief Elaine Whitecloud's son is revealed to be the doctor that treated Jules after her suicide attempt and flirted with Cody. Jules reveals she is pregnant.
10	"Departures"	Andrew Bernstein	Story by : Jon Harmon Feldman; Teleplay by : Nicholas Schutt & David Renaud	December 13, 2015	3.13
Chief Elaine Whitecloud informs Annie and Hap she's not making deals with either of them until she has more time to consider her options. Jules steals a cup Hap drank from to collect his DNA in an effort to see if Hap or his son Wick is the father. A lady working for Carla bribes a nurse for Jules' medical file. Cody fights with Billy and he says Emma kissed her and he was drunk. Cody tells him she's leaving for Florida and if he's not with her by midnight she'll leave without him. AJ thinks his son has been killed after a phone call with him ends with violent shouting and a gun shot and Hap recognizes background noise from the recording of the call as a shift change whistle at one of his rigs. Carla confronts Jules and offers her money to leave and not tell Hap about the child. Sheriff Harrison helps track down AJ's son. The doctor offers Cody a chance to go to Haiti with Doctors Without Borders. AJ's Saudi controller is found dead and his son is found in the same house in a closet, but a menacing man is seen watching from behind the police line. The doctor goes to Billy and says he'll give him the mineral rights but he has to stay in town and as a result let Cody leave him. Annie and Hap team up. Jules contemplates taking Carla's offer. Doctor White gives Cody a plane ticket to Haiti. Billy goes to Briggs' house to sign the deal where Lacey tells Hap of Wick's involvement in the rig heist. Hap takes a gun from a safe and holds it to Wick's head and they make amends. Jules meets with Carla and tells her she accepts the deal. Lacey is attacked by the man who was watching outside the house AJ's son was kept in. Billy tries to protect her and Sheriff Harrison shoots the attacker. Billy is knocked out in the process and is unable to get to Cody in time to convince her to stay with him. Hap informs him that Chief Whitecloud found out about her son's demands of Billy and offered Hap the deal without them, freeing Billy of his obligation to stay so he can go after Cody. Jules tells Wick that he's actually the father of her child and asks him to leave with her. Cody finds Billy at the bar looking for her and they make up and go 'home'. The series ends with Hap and Carla looking over a snowy oil field.

== Reception ==
=== Critical response ===
The show has received average reviews from television critics, with several critics comparing the series to Dallas and its 2012 revival. On Rotten Tomatoes, the first season has a rating of 62%, based on 42 reviews, with an average rating of 5.9/10. The website's consensus reads, "High stakes and bawdy plots make Blood & Oil's plain premise and characters tolerable." On Metacritic, the show has a score of 49 out of 100, based on reviews from 23 critics, indicating "mixed or average reviews".

Willa Paskin from Slate said of the show, "Blood & Oil is not a realistic drama but an out-and-out soap opera." David Wiegland of the San Francisco Chronicle had mixed feelings: "You see where all of this is going, of course, but no one is out to surprise viewers with 'Blood and Oil'. This is a soap opera. It may not last as long as either Dallas, but it's working the same territory." Maureen Ryan of The Huffington Post criticized the series, stating "Aside from Don Johnson's canny oil baron, and as we found with the "Dallas" revival, one savvy old dude can't always carry an entire show on his back, especially when the rest of it is so mechanical." The Washington Post's Hank Stuever panned the series outright: "Dreadfully conceived and horribly acted." On the contrary, Gail Pennington of The St. Louis Post-Dispatch had a slightly more positive opinion on Blood & Oil in her review: "The pleasantly fresh setting is the North Dakota oil boom, but the tone is very "Dallas," and the storytelling is as melodramatic as the show's title."

=== Ratings ===
No.	Title	Air date	Rating/share (18–49)	Viewers (millions)	DVR (18–49)	DVR viewers (millions)	Total (18–49)	Total viewers (millions)
1	"Pilot"	September 27, 2015	1.4/4	6.36	0.7	2.63	2.1	8.99
2	"The Ripple Effect"	October 4, 2015	1.3/3	5.27	0.5	2.08	1.8	7.35
3	"Hustle and Flow"	October 11, 2015	0.9/2	3.91	—N/a	1.93	—N/a	5.84
4	"The Birthday Party"	October 18, 2015	0.9/2	3.50	—N/a	—N/a	—N/a	—N/a
5	"Rocks and Hard Places"	October 25, 2015	0.9/2	3.77	—N/a	—N/a	—N/a	—N/a
6	"Convergence"	November 1, 2015	0.8/2	3.25	0.6	1.71	1.4	4.96
7	"Fight or Flight"	November 8, 2015	0.8/2	3.40	0.6	1.78	1.4	5.19
8	"Rats, Bugs and Moles"	November 29, 2015	0.9/2	3.20	0.6	1.78	1.5	4.98
9	"The Art of the Deal"	December 6, 2015	0.9/3	3.23	TBA	TBA	TBA	TBA
10	"Departures"	December 13, 2015	0.8/3	3.13	TBA	TBA	TBA	TBA
