= The Grave (1996 film) =

- Directed by: Jonas Pate
- Screenplay by: Jonas Pate; Josh Pate
- Story by: Peter Glatzer
- Produced by: Peter Glatzer; Scott Kalmbach; Donald Kushner; Peter Locke; Lawrence Mortorff
- Starring: Craig Sheffer; Gabrielle Anwar; Josh Charles; Donal Logue; Keith David; John Diehl; Eric Roberts
- Cinematography: Frank Prinzi
- Edited by: Paul Trejo
- Music by: Alex Wurman
- Production company: The Kushner-Locke Company
- Distributed by: New City Releasing
- Release date: January 1996 (Sundance)
- Running time: 90 minutes
- Country: United States
- Language: English

The Grave is a 1996 thriller starring Craig Sheffer, Gabrielle Anwar and Josh Charles, the first project written by twin brothers Jonas Pate and Josh Pate, and directed by Jonas Pate. It notably features supporting performances by character actors Donal Logue, Max Perlich, Anthony Michael Hall, and Eric Roberts, along with an early appearance by Giovanni Ribisi.

== Plot ==
An unseen figure in a jail cell with a raspy voice tells a story to another undetermined occupant in the cell.

Two years previous, brothers King and Tyn are serving a 20-year sentence in a Southern prison for joyriding in a stolen car. The brothers are told by a fellow inmate, Wex, about a local legend of a large undetermined fortune hidden in the grave of Masterson, a legendary local millionaire. King barters with one of the crooked officers in the prison, J.C. Cole, to allow them to escape in exchange for a share of the fortune. While not a clean getaway, the brothers successfully break out of the jail.

While on the run, during an attempt to steal civilian clothes from a laundry line, Tyn is shot by the homeowner. The brothers are able to get help from a stranger who allows them to take his truck, so he can report it stolen and collect the insurance. However, fearing recapture if they go to a proper hospital, they reluctantly visit an estranged friend, mortician Travis Purcell, who was responsible for sending them to jail, to tend to the wound. King alludes to being able to repay Travis for the favor, and leaves Tyn in his care. King then visits his ex-girlfriend Jordan, who is not happy to see him but goes to bed with him and lets him stay the night. J.C. spies on the couple during their night together. King promises to cut Jordan in on his payday, but she doubts anything will come of his claim.

Travis determines that Tyn's wound is mortal, and threatens to not take him to a hospital unless he yields everything he knows about the grave. Tyn gives up his information, but dies anyway. With his slow-witted accomplices Cletus and Boo, the three go to dig up the grave themselves. They open the grave, and find only Masterson's decayed corpse, with a pair of rings on its fingers. Travis takes one figuring it must have some worth. Boo hears someone coming near the grave, and knocks him unconscious with a shovel; it turns out to be King, coming to himself dig up the grave. In the panic of assaulting their friend, Travis ostensibly takes King's pulse and determines he is dead, and puts him in Masterson's grave. Boo is sent to go to town and lose King's truck, but J.C. ambushes Boo and strangles him to unconsciousness. The next morning, J.C. weights down Boo's legs, and throws him in a creek, which wakes him. J.C. gives him the choice of drowning, telling him who told him about the grave, or using a knife to sever his limbs. After initially trying the third option, Boo reveals Travis and Cletus' involvement, but drowns anyway.

Travis and Cletus go to an antique shop run by Jordan, asking her to interpret markings on Masterson's ring. She tells them that urban legend was that Masterson as an elderly man had married a very young woman, Ophelia, hoping for an heir, but found she was infertile, and that they bought a child to raise instead, who was never heard from after both their deaths. She also reveals that the ring is worthless without its companion ring, inspiring the men to return to the grave to dig it out. When they unearth Masterson's coffin again, King is miraculously still alive, albeit woozy. They retrieve the second ring and save him, but he quickly determines it was Travis who left him for dead. When they revisit Jordan, she is able to identify a Latin message viewable only when the rings are interlocked, but only offers it after King promises her a share of the fortune. It is deduced that whatever fortune Masterson hid is in Ophelia's grave.

The men lift the stone cover from Ophelia's grave, and find a ladder to an underground tunnel. The follow it to an iron door, and upon opening it, find a vault that contains both the dismembered remains of Ophelia, indicating Masterson killed her, and large amounts of cash and jewelry, the fortune she married him for. In their celebratory mania, someone locks the vault door, trapping them inside. Jordan emerges from Ophelia's grave as the party responsible for locking them in. She is confronted by J.C., who reveals his intention to kill her. He shoots her and she falls to the ground, and as he steps to her to make sure she is dead, discovers he only shot her in the throat, and she in turn takes a hidden shotgun and kills him.

Returning to the cell, the storyteller is revealed to be Jordan, now using an artificial larynx to speak, explaining her altered voice, and the other person in the room is a priest. She reveals that since J.C. was a cop, she was doomed to be sentenced to death for killing him. When the priest asks what happened to Masterson's changeling, she offers no conclusive answer but hints that it was her. Jordan is escorted to the electric chair and executed at dawn.

Some time later, the priest visits the cemetery, and opens Ophelia's grave.

== Cast ==
- Craig Sheffer as King
- Gabrielle Anwar as Jordan
- Josh Charles as Tyn
- Donal Logue as Cletus
- Keith David as The Priest
- John Diehl as J.C. Cole
- Giovanni Ribisi as Wex
- Anthony Michael Hall as Travis Percell
- Max Perlich as Boo
- Eric Roberts as Cass

== Release ==
The Grave did not receive a theatrical release, but instead was given a world premiere on HBO, and was later released on VHS by Republic Pictures. In 2021, it received its first-ever Blu-Ray release from Vinegar Syndrome, featuring commentary by director Jonas Pate and an interview with Keith David.
