= Art of Conflict: The Murals of Northern Ireland =

2012 documentary by Valeri Vaughn

- Film poster
- Directed by: Valeri Vaughn
- Starring: Gerry Adams; Danny Devenny; David Ervine
- Edited by: Dan Lebental
- Distributed by: Netflix
- Release date: October 12, 2012
- Running time: 73 minutes
- Countries: Ireland, United Kingdom, United States
- Language: English

Art of Conflict: The Murals of Northern Ireland is a 2012 documentary film about the Murals in Northern Ireland.

Directed by Valeri Vaughn, it was released on Netflix on October 12, 2012.

== Premise ==
The Art of Conflict examines Northern Ireland's troubled past expressed in unique street art.

== Cast ==
- Gerry Adams
- Danny Devenny
- David Ervine
- Mark Ervine
- Jonathan McCormick
- Bill Rolston
- Owen Thomas
- Vince Vaughn

== Release ==
Art of Conflict: The Murals of Northern Ireland was released on October 12, 2012 on Netflix.
