= G vs E =

- Also known as: Good vs Evil
- Genre: Supernatural; Buddy cop; Spy-fi; Science fiction; Fantasy; Action; Comedy drama
- Created by: Jonas Pate; Josh Pate
- Starring: Clayton Rohner; Richard Brooks; Marshall Bell; Googy Gress
- Country of origin: United States
- Original language: English
- No. of seasons: 2
- No. of episodes: 22

Production
- Running time: 43 minutes
- Production companies: Rockfish Films; Studios USA Television

Original release
- Network: USA Network (1999); Sci Fi (2000)
- Release: July 18, 1999 – May 12, 2000

G vs E (later retitled Good vs Evil) is an American supernatural comedy-drama television series that had its first season air on USA Network during the summer and autumn of 1999. For the second season the series moved to Sci Fi in early 2000. The series stars Clayton Rohner, Richard Brooks and Marshall Bell.

G vs E pitted a group of agents who are assigned to "the Corps", a secret agency under the command of Heaven, against the "Morlocks", a group of evildoers from Hell.

The series has a 1970s retro-hip style that is similar to Quentin Tarantino's Pulp Fiction. The show is fast-moving and harkens back to the blaxploitation films of the 1970s. It also mixes spy-fi elements with the end of the millennium Zeitgeist of the late 1990s.

== Plot ==
Chandler Smythe (Clayton Rohner) is murdered on his 35th birthday. He is then recruited as an agent of the Corps and becomes a partner to Henry McNeil (Richard Brooks). Henry was killed in the 1970s and still dresses like Shaft. The Corps, best described as God's police force on Earth, has the mission of locating citizens who have made a Faustian-style bargain with the agents of evil. When the Corps find a lost soul, they must decide whether to rehabilitate them or eliminate them from existence if they are beyond redemption.

Overseeing their patrols are Decker (Googy Gress) and Ford (Marshall Bell), who give the weekly assignments. Deacon Jones acts as series narrator and appears on screen as "the Deacon". The Deacon is the head of the Corps as shown in the last episode and all Corps agents are ranked beneath him. However he is not god. God is never seen on the show.

Chandler's teenage son Ben, played by Tony Denman, occasionally appears. Chandler guides him in subtle ways.

The Corps itself functions much like any police force does, with various departments and a city-based structure. Paramedics, supply officers, spies, intelligence agents, forensic specialists, therapists, and munitions experts are all on hand to help with cases. They operate throughout the world in various cities. Chandler and Henry work out of the Hollywood station. They are based at Ravenswood, a high-rise art-deco establishment, which also doubles as purgatory.

All the agents of the Corps have gone through a violent, mortal death, but merely being alive again does not render them immortal. They can "die" again, and they face immediate judgement upon dying, which may be a problem for those who have not completed their redemption. Injury can happen to them, as can all the usual mental anguish that mortals suffer. Corps agents have no magical powers to give them an advantage over the opposition. Another limitation is that agents of the Corps are not allowed to have sexual relations with others, due to the fact that sleeping with a Morlock will turn an agent into one. They also cannot overtly contact their friends and family from before they died.

The Corps battle with two types of foes: Faustians and Morlocks. The Faustians are ordinary people who have made a deal with the forces of evil and bask in the fortunes that such a deal allows them on Earth. The Morlocks are Faustians who have died their mortal death and are now the ground troops for the dark side, evil's equivalent to the Corps. They are identifiable as people who have suddenly become sarcastic and courageous to extreme degrees. In addition, mirrors reveal the true nature of Morlocks; their reflections are twisted and demonic. Unlike Corps agents, Morlocks have superhuman resilience, and they cannot be easily killed.

Both Morlocks and the Corps have double agents planted in each other's ranks.

== Episodes ==
=== Season 1 (1999) ===
No. overall	No. in season	Title	Directed by	Written by	Original release date
1	1	"Orange Volvo"	Josh Pate & Jonas Pate	Josh Pate & Jonas Pate	July 18, 1999
After dying, Chandler Smythe finds himself recruited into the Corps and partnered with Henry McNeil. He is soon assigned to rescue a prisoner framed for killing a cop; complicating matters is that the cop in question is actually a Morlock determined to see the man burn.
2	2	"Men Are from Mars, Women Are Evil"	Josh Pate	Josh Pate	July 25, 1999
Henry and Chandler enter the underground world of strip clubs to track down a serial killer. However, Chandler soon finds himself at risk of breaking the Corps's rules on having a relationship with humans when he falls in love with a stripper.
3	3	"Buried"	Josh Pate	Josh Pate	August 1, 1999
After taking a solo side mission, Chandler wakes up to find himself buried alive with no memory of the past three days and only his cell phone to help him. Now Chandler must remember anything to help lead Henry to him before he suffocates.
4	4	"Gee Your Hair Smells Evil"	Jonas Pate	Josh Pate & Jonas Pate	August 8, 1999
Chandler and Henry must prevent a frustrated young hairdresser from giving into a Morlock's promises of fortune and fame. Guest starring Pedro Pascal, Erin Moran, Charlene Tilton, Dawn Wells.
5	5	"Airplane"	Josh Pate	Josh Pate	August 15, 1999
When Henry and Chandler are transporting a captured Morlock back to Corps headquarters via airplane, the Morlock escapes and kills the pilots, sending the plane into a freefall.
6	6	"Evilator"	Marshall Page	Marshall Page	August 22, 1999
Decker and Ford assign Chandler, Henry, and Esmeralda on what is in all likelihood a suicide mission to rescue a captured undercover agent from the Morlocks.
7	7	"To Be or Not to Be Evil"	Dan Ireland	David Kleiler	August 29, 1999
Henry and Chandler go undercover in Hollywood to investigate Morlocks making more Faustian bargains. However, Henry finds himself so swept up in the lifestyle that he signs a Faustian deal himself, leaving it up to Chandler to help him renounce it.
8	8	"Choose Your Own Evil"	J. Cheng	Marshall Page	October 3, 1999
The Morlocks kidnap Chandler's son Ben, demanding that he give them an amulet with the power to cause the apocalypse in exchange.
9	9	"Sunday Night Evil"	Jonas Pate	David Kleiler & Jonas Pate	October 10, 1999
Henry and Chandler investigate if the new World Wrestling Federation champion took his position through a Faustian bargain. Guest starring Mick Foley.
10	10	"Lady Evil"	Norwood Cheek	David Kleiler	October 17, 1999
After a struggling rock singer makes a deal with a Morlock to rise to stardom, Henry and Chandler must get him to renounce the deal. Guest starring Maury Sterling and Taylor Negron.
11	11	"Cliffhanger"	J. Cheng	Carter Blanchard	October 31, 1999
Chandler and Henry find their investigation into whether a hack writer's newfound talent is the result of a Faustian deal hampered by the writer's literary agent.

=== Season 2 (2000) ===
No. overall	No. in season	Title	Directed by	Written by	Original release date
12	1	"Nurse Evil"	Lance Mungia	Lawrence Meyers	March 10, 2000
When Chandler is arrested and sent to a mental institution, he finds one of his fellow inmates is the sister of an agent who knows about the Corps. Meanwhile, Ben attempts to romance his occult-loving crush by telling her about the Corps and the Morlocks.
13	2	"Renunciation"	Joshua Butler	Story by : Jarrett Bryant; Teleplay by : Jonas Pate and Jarrett Bryant	March 10, 2000
Henry and Chandler are assigned to get Henry's murderer and former best friend to renounce a Faustian deal. However, a vengeful Henry intends to kill the man.
14	3	"Immigrant Evil"	J. Cheng	Gary Glasberg	March 17, 2000
Henry and Chandler must stop a Morlock from preying upon Serbian refugees and forcing them to make Faustian deals in exchange for safe passage to America. Guest starring Dominic Keating and Ilia Volok.
15	4	"Ambulance Chaser"	Josh Pate	Jonas Pate	March 24, 2000
After Chandler and Henry's battle with a Morlock is photographed by a reporter, they must not only convince her not to run the story but also kill the Morlock.
16	5	"Wonderful Life"	Joshua Butler	Josh Pate	March 31, 2000
After a woman who just renounced a Faustian deal is murdered by the Morlock who recruited her, Chandler suffers a crisis of faith and goes AWOL. While Henry searches for him so that Chandler isn't sent downstairs as punishment, Chandler reconnects with a suicidal old friend. Guest starring Robert Costanzo and Arye Gross.
17	6	"Love Conquers Evil"	J. Cheng	Ronald D. Moore	April 7, 2000
The Morlocks set up a dating service both to make an abundance of Faustian deals but also to target members of the Corps.
18	7	"Cougar Pines"	Josh Pate	Marshall Davis	April 14, 2000
Chandler and Henry must investigate who murdered a Faustian golf pro. Guest starring Jolene Blalock and John Billingsley.
19	8	"M Is for Morlock"	Carlton Prickett	Story by : David Burris & Paul Kolsby; Teleplay by : Jonas Pate and Christopher Markus and Stephen McFeely	April 21, 2000
After the Corps institutes a reward points system as an incentive for killing Morlocks, Chandler and Henry compete against each other to see who can score the most points.
20	9	"Relic of Evil"	Jonas Pate	Ronald D. Moore	April 28, 2000
Chandler and Henry must prevent the infamous Morlock El Aurens from obtaining the Tablet of Santiago, which can transform Corps agents into demons.
21	10	"Portrait of Evil"	David Mackay	Marshall Page	May 5, 2000
Henry is offered the chance for ascension as a reward for reaching a severely injured Chandler from a Morlock. Meanwhile, Chandler finds himself going stir-crazy, and takes to looking at his neighbors with a telescope, only to spot one of them making a Faustian deal.
22	11	"Underworld"	Josh Pate & Jonas Pate	Josh Pate & Jonas Pate	May 12, 2000
When he and Henry have a trust problem, Chandler relates to him his death and his first 24 hours in the Corps.

== Reception ==
Critics from the New York Post, Wall Street Journal, Variety, Entertainment Weekly, and People gave the show positive reviews, while Noel Holston of the Star Tribune gave the series 2.5 stars out of 5.
