= Josh Pate (screenwriter) =

American film director

- Born: Joshua Warren Pate; January 15, 1970 (age 56); Raeford, North Carolina, United States
- Occupations: Screenwriter, director, producer
- Years active: 1996–present
- Relatives: Jonas Pate (twin brother)

Joshua Warren Pate (born January 15, 1970) is an American screenwriter, director and producer. He wrote The Grave, Deceiver, and The Take. Pate also co-created Good vs Evil, Surface, and Outer Banks.

== Early life ==
Josh Pate was born in Winston-Salem, North Carolina, and is the twin brother of fellow filmmaker Jonas Pate.

He received a Bachelor of Arts in English from the University of North Carolina at Chapel Hill in 1992.

== Career ==
In 1996, Pate began his screenwriting career, working alongside his brother Jonas on the thriller called The Grave. The film received a wide range of positive reviews after a screening at the Sundance Film Festival.

They collaborated on the movie Deceiver the following year. "The Pate brothers" subsequently created the fantasy action television show Good vs Evil (1999). He later moved on to direct two episodes of Fastlane (2002–2003).

From 2003 to 2004, Pate served as co-executive producer on L.A. Dragnet, for which he also wrote two episodes.

In 2005, he co-created the science fiction series Surface, which aired until 2006. The same year, he also co-directed the Chris Isaak music video "Please", and an episode of Friday Night Lights.

He continued his film career by co-writing the screenplay for The Take (2007). From 2007 to 2008, he held the position of consulting producer on the paranormal romance television drama Moonlight.

Pate was an executive producer for the 2012 comedy fantasy film Mirror Mirror.

He also signed on to co-write—with his brother—the independent crime drama film Way Down South.

He executive produces the musical series The Runarounds which premiered on September 1, 2025.

== Filmography ==
Film

Year	Title	Director	Writer
1996	The Grave	Yes	Yes
1997	Deceiver	Yes	Yes
2007	The Take	No	Yes
2009	Shrink	Yes	No
2013	Way Down South	Yes	Yes

Television

Year	Title	Director	Writer	Executive producer	Creator	Notes
1999–2000	Good vs Evil	Yes	Yes	Yes	Yes	Wrote 6 episodes and directed 5 episodes
2002–03	Fastlane	Yes	No	No	No	Directed 2 episodes
2003–04	L.A. Dragnet	No	Yes	Yes	No	Wrote 2 episodes
2005–06	Surface	Yes	Yes	Yes	Yes	Wrote 4 episodes and directed 2 episodes
2006	Friday Night Lights	Yes	No	No	No	Directed 1 episode
2007–08	Moonlight	No	Yes	Consulting	No	Wrote 2 episodes
2012	666 Park Avenue	No	Yes	No	No	Wrote 1 episode
2014	Falling Skies	No	Yes	Consulting	No	Wrote 2 episodes
2014	Legends	No	Yes	Co-Executive	No	Wrote 6 episodes
2015	Blood & Oil	No	Yes	Yes	Yes	Wrote 2 episodes
2020–26	Outer Banks	No	Yes	Yes	Yes	Wrote 44 episodes
2025	The Runarounds	No	No	Yes	No	

Music video

Year	Title	Notes
2006	Best of Chris Isaak	"Please"

== Awards and nominations ==
Year	Award	Category	Title	Result
1997	Stockholm International Film Festival	Best Screenplay	Deceiver (shared with Jonas Pate)	Won
1998	Festival du Film Policier de Cognac	Special Jury Prize	Deceiver (shared with Jonas Pate)	Won
