= Jonas Pate =

American writer & director

- Born: Jonas James Pate; January 15, 1970 (age 56); Winston-Salem, North Carolina, U.S.
- Occupations: Screenwriter, director, producer
- Years active: 1996–present
- Spouse: Jennifer Pate (m. 2001)
- Children: 2
- Relatives: Josh Pate (twin brother)

Jonas James Pate (born January 15, 1970) is an American screenwriter, director and producer. He wrote and directed The Grave, Deceiver, The Take, and directed Shrink.

Pate also co-created the USA Network series Good vs Evil, the NBC series Surface, and the Netflix series Outer Banks.

== Early life ==
Jonas Pate was born in Winston-Salem, North Carolina, and is the twin brother of fellow filmmaker Josh Pate. Pate's parents divorced when he was young, and the siblings were raised through elementary school with their mother and step-father in Atlanta, Georgia, and through high school with their father and step-mother in Raeford, NC. He studied philosophy at Princeton University, and graduated in 1992.

== Career ==
In 1996, Pate started his career by writing and directing the thriller film called The Grave with his brother Josh. After a screening at the Sundance Film Festival, it received a wide range of positive reviews. The following year, they collaborated on the movie Deceiver. He subsequently co-created the fantasy action television show Good vs Evil (1999) alongside his brother. From 2003 to 2004, he served as co-executive producer on L.A. Dragnet, for which he also wrote an episode. In 2005, he co-created the science fiction series Surface, which aired until 2006.

As his filmography was already fleshing out, he took on several directing jobs on television series like Battlestar Galactica (2005), Bionic Woman (2007), Friday Night Lights (2007–2010), Chuck (2008), The Philanthropist (2009), Caprica (2010), Undercovers (2010), The Event (2010–2011), and Prime Suspect (2011). He continued his film career by writing the screenplay for The Take (2007). In 2009, he directed the independent film Shrink.

Pate is the director and executive producer on the Battlestar Galactica prequel entitled Blood & Chrome. He has also signed on to direct the independent crime drama film Way Down South, written by himself and his brother.

Pate is the co-creator and executive producer of Outer Banks for Netflix, a teen drama that premiered on April 15, 2020.

== Personal life ==
Pate currently lives with his wife, Jennifer, and two young adult children, Lilah and Cooper, in Wilmington, North Carolina.

In 2020, he was appointed by Governor Roy Cooper to the Governor's Advisory Council on Film, Television, and Digital Streaming.

His daughter, Lilah, has made several cameos on Outer Banks and several other Netflix and Amazon Prime Video series; such as The Summer I Turned Pretty.

== Filmography ==
Film

Year	Title	Director	Writer	Producer
1996	The Grave	Yes	Yes	No
1997	Deceiver	Yes	Yes	No
2007	The Take	No	Yes	No
2009	Shrink	Yes	No	No
2013	Way Down South	Yes	Yes	No
2025	Driver's Ed	No	No	Yes

Television

Year	Title	Director	Writer	Executive producer	Creator	Notes
1999–2000	Good vs Evil	Yes	Yes	Yes	Yes	Wrote 3 episodes, directed 5 episodes
2003–2004	L.A. Dragnet	No	Yes	Co-executive	No	Wrote episode "Abduction"
2005	Battlestar Galactica	Yes	No	No	No	Directed episode "Colonial Day"
2005–2006	Surface	Yes	Yes	Yes	Yes	Wrote 4 episodes, directed episode: "There's Something Strange Going on in the World's Oceans"
2007	Bionic Woman	Yes	No	Co-executive	No	Directed episode "The Education of Jaime Sommers"
2007–2010	Friday Night Lights	Yes	No	No	No	Directed 3 episodes
2008	Chuck	Yes	No	No	No	Directed episode "Chuck Versus the Sensei"
2008	Jen and Barb: Mom Life	No	No	Yes	No	
2009	The Philanthropist	Yes	No	Co-executive	No	Directed 2 episodes
2010	Caprica	Yes	No	Co-executive	No	Directed 3 episodes
2010	Undercovers	Yes	No	No	No	Directed episode "Funny Money"
2010–2011	The Event	Yes	No	No	No	Directed 2 episodes
2011	Prime Suspect	Yes	No	Co-executive	No	Directed 2 episodes
2012	Battlestar Galactica: Blood & Chrome	Yes	No	Yes	No	
2013	Deception	Yes	No	Co-executive	No	Directed 5 episodes
2014	Believe	Yes	No	Yes	Yes	Directed episode "White Noise", wrote 4 episodes
2015	Blood & Oil	Yes	No	Yes	No	Directed 2 episodes
2015–2016	Aquarius	Yes	No	Yes	No	Directed 7 episodes
2016	Good Behavior	Yes	No	No	No	Directed episode "We Pretend We're Stuck"
2017	The Arrangement	Yes	No	No	No	Directed 3 episodes
2017	Chance	Yes	No	No	No	Directed 3 episodes
2018	Iron Fist	Yes	No	No	No	Directed episode "A Duel of Iron"
2018	New Amsterdam	Yes	No	No	No	Directed episode "Every Last Minute"
2020–2026	Outer Banks	Yes	Yes	Yes	Yes	Wrote 3 episodes, directed 30 episodes
2025	The Runarounds	Yes	Yes	Yes	Yes	Wrote 6 episodes, directed 6 episodes

Music video

Year	Title	Notes
2006	Best of Chris Isaak	"Please"

== Awards and nominations ==
Year	Title	Category	Title	Result
1996	Mystfest	Best Film	The Grave	Nominated
1997	Stockholm International Film Festival	Best Screenplay	Deceiver (shared with Josh Pate)	Won
1998	Festival du Film Policier de Cognac	Special Jury Prize	Deceiver (shared with Josh Pate)	Won
