= List of Bates Motel episodes =

Bates Motel is an American psychological horror drama television series developed by Carlton Cuse, James Sellers, and Lacey Nash for A&E.

Using characters and elements from the novel Psycho by Robert Bloch, the series serves as a "prequel" to the 1960 film of the same name directed by Alfred Hitchcock, albeit within a contemporary setting. Following the death of her abusive husband, Norma Louise Bates (Vera Farmiga) relocates to the fictional town of White Pine Bay, Oregon with her son Norman (Freddie Highmore). There, she purchases a small motel and attempts to start a new life with her son. They are soon intercepted by Norma's estranged son, Dylan Massett (Max Thieriot), who carries his own secrets. The three are quick to discover that the idyllic town is not at all what it seems and that dangerous secrets lurk around every corner.

The series premiered on March 18, 2013, and received generally positive reviews. During the course of the series, 50 episodes of Bates Motel aired, concluding on April 24, 2017.

== Series overview ==
Season	Episodes	Originally released	
Season	Episodes	First released	Last released
1	10	March 18, 2013	May 20, 2013
2	10	March 3, 2014	May 5, 2014
3	10	March 9, 2015	May 11, 2015
4	10	March 7, 2016	May 16, 2016
5	10	February 20, 2017	April 24, 2017

== Episodes ==
=== Season 1 (2013) ===
No. overall	No. in season	Title	Directed by	Written by	Original release date	US viewers (millions)
1	1	"First You Dream, Then You Die"	Tucker Gates	Story by : Carlton Cuse, Kerry Ehrin & Anthony Cipriano; Teleplay by : Kerry Ehrin & Anthony Cipriano	March 18, 2013	3.04
2	2	"Nice Town You Picked, Norma..."	Tucker Gates	Kerry Ehrin	March 25, 2013	2.84
3	3	"What's Wrong with Norman"	Paul A. Edwards	Jeff Wadlow	April 1, 2013	2.82
4	4	"Trust Me"	Johan Renck	Kerry Ehrin	April 8, 2013	2.30
5	5	"Ocean View"	David Straiton	Jeff Wadlow	April 15, 2013	2.66
6	6	"The Truth"	Tucker Gates	Carlton Cuse & Kerry Ehrin	April 22, 2013	2.93
7	7	"The Man in Number 9"	S. J. Clarkson	Kerry Ehrin	April 29, 2013	2.99
8	8	"A Boy and His Dog"	Ed Bianchi	Bill Balas	May 6, 2013	2.71
9	9	"Underwater"	Tucker Gates	Carlton Cuse & Kerry Ehrin	May 13, 2013	2.48
10	10	"Midnight"	Tucker Gates	Carlton Cuse & Kerry Ehrin	May 20, 2013	2.70

=== Season 2 (2014) ===
No. overall	No. in season	Title	Directed by	Written by	Original release date	US viewers (millions)
11	1	"Gone But Not Forgotten"	Tucker Gates	Carlton Cuse & Kerry Ehrin	March 3, 2014	3.07
12	2	"Shadow of a Doubt"	Tucker Gates	Kerry Ehrin	March 10, 2014	2.22
13	3	"Caleb"	Lodge Kerrigan	Alexandra Cunningham	March 17, 2014	1.85
14	4	"Check-Out"	John David Coles	Liz Tigelaar	March 24, 2014	2.23
15	5	"The Escape Artist"	Christopher Nelson	Nikki Toscano	March 31, 2014	2.27
16	6	"Plunge"	Ed Bianchi	Kerry Ehrin	April 7, 2014	2.24
17	7	"Presumed Innocent"	Roxann Dawson	Alexandra Cunningham	April 14, 2014	2.44
18	8	"Meltdown"	Ed Bianchi	Liz Tigelaar & Nikki Toscano	April 21, 2014	2.10
19	9	"The Box"	Tucker Gates	Carlton Cuse & Kerry Ehrin	April 28, 2014	2.25
20	10	"The Immutable Truth"	Tucker Gates	Carlton Cuse & Kerry Ehrin	May 5, 2014	2.30

=== Season 3 (2015) ===
No. overall	No. in season	Title	Directed by	Written by	Original release date	US viewers (millions)
21	1	"A Death in the Family"	Tucker Gates	Carlton Cuse & Kerry Ehrin	March 9, 2015	2.14
22	2	"The Arcanum Club"	Tucker Gates	Kerry Ehrin	March 16, 2015	1.91
23	3	"Persuasion"	Tim Southam	Steve Kornacki & Alyson Evans	March 23, 2015	1.92
24	4	"Unbreak-Able"	Christopher Nelson	Erica Lipez	March 30, 2015	1.71
25	5	"The Deal"	Néstor Carbonell	Scott Kosar	April 6, 2015	1.76
26	6	"Norma Louise"	Phil Abraham	Kerry Ehrin	April 13, 2015	1.69
27	7	"The Last Supper"	Ed Bianchi	Philip Buiser	April 20, 2015	1.69
28	8	"The Pit"	Roxann Dawson	Bill Balas	April 27, 2015	1.76
29	9	"Crazy"	Tucker Gates	Steve Kornacki & Alyson Evans & Torrey Speer	May 4, 2015	1.73
30	10	"Unconscious"	Tucker Gates	Carlton Cuse & Kerry Ehrin	May 11, 2015	1.67

=== Season 4 (2016) ===
No. overall	No. in season	Title	Directed by	Written by	Original release date	US viewers (millions)
31	1	"A Danger to Himself and Others"	Tucker Gates	Carlton Cuse & Kerry Ehrin	March 7, 2016	1.55
32	2	"Goodnight, Mother"	Tim Southam	Kerry Ehrin & Torrey Speer	March 14, 2016	1.45
33	3	"'Til Death Do You Part"	Phil Abraham	Steve Kornacki & Alyson Evans	March 21, 2016	1.46
34	4	"Lights of Winter"	T.J. Scott	Tom Szentgyörgyi	March 28, 2016	1.52
35	5	"Refraction"	Sarah Boyd	Erica Lipez	April 11, 2016	1.42
36	6	"The Vault"	Olatunde Osunsanmi	Scott Kosar	April 18, 2016	1.33
37	7	"There's No Place Like Home"	Néstor Carbonell	Philip Buiser	April 25, 2016	1.35
38	8	"Unfaithful"	Stephen Surjik	Freddie Highmore	May 2, 2016	1.52
39	9	"Forever"	Tim Southam	Carlton Cuse & Kerry Ehrin	May 9, 2016	1.41
40	10	"Norman"	Tucker Gates	Kerry Ehrin	May 16, 2016	1.50

=== Season 5 (2017) ===
No. overall	No. in season	Title	Directed by	Written by	Original release date	US viewers (millions)
41	1	"Dark Paradise"	Tucker Gates	Kerry Ehrin	February 20, 2017	1.34
42	2	"The Convergence of the Twain"	Sarah Boyd	Alyson Evans & Steve Kornacki	February 27, 2017	1.28
43	3	"Bad Blood"	Sarah Boyd	Tom Szentgyörgyi	March 6, 2017	1.28
44	4	"Hidden"	Max Thieriot	Torrey Speer	March 13, 2017	1.25
45	5	"Dreams Die First"	Néstor Carbonell	Erica Lipez & Kerry Ehrin	March 20, 2017	1.36
46	6	"Marion"	Phil Abraham	Carlton Cuse & Kerry Ehrin	March 27, 2017	1.30
47	7	"Inseparable"	Steph Green	Story by : Freddie Highmore & Erica Lipez; Teleplay by : Freddie Highmore	April 3, 2017	1.26
48	8	"The Body"	Freddie Highmore	Erica Lipez	April 10, 2017	1.23
49	9	"Visiting Hours"	Olatunde Osunsanmi	Scott Kosar	April 17, 2017	1.22
50	10	"The Cord"	Tucker Gates	Kerry Ehrin & Carlton Cuse	April 24, 2017	1.41

== Ratings ==
Bates Motel : U.S. viewers per episode (millions)

Season	Episode number										Average
Season	1	2	3	4	5	6	7	8	9	10	Average
1	3.04	2.84	2.82	2.30	2.66	2.93	2.99	2.71	2.48	2.70	2.75
2	3.07	2.22	1.85	2.23	2.27	2.24	2.44	2.10	2.25	2.30	2.30
3	2.14	1.91	1.92	1.71	1.76	1.69	1.69	1.76	1.73	1.67	1.80
4	1.55	1.45	1.46	1.52	1.42	1.33	1.35	1.52	1.41	1.50	1.44
5	1.34	1.28	1.28	1.25	1.36	1.30	1.26	1.23	1.22	1.41	1.29

Audience measurement performed by Nielsen Media Research
