= List of awards and nominations received by Bates Motel =

Awards and nominations received by Bates Motel
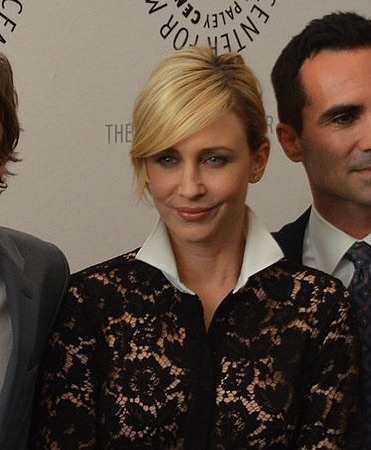
Award	Wins	Nominations
Casting Society of America	0	1
Critics' Choice Television Awards	0	7
Primetime Emmy Awards	0	3
Satellite Awards	0	2
Saturn Awards	1	9
TCA Awards	0	1
People's Choice Awards	3	6

The following is a list of awards and nominations received by Bates Motel, the American drama-thriller television series that debuted on A&E on March 18, 2013. The series stars Vera Farmiga and Freddie Highmore in lead roles.

== Awards by association ==
=== Primetime Emmy Awards ===
Year	Nominee(s)	Category	Result	Ref(s)
2013	Vera Farmiga	Outstanding Lead Actress in a Drama Series	Nominated	
2016	John S. Bartley	Outstanding Cinematography for a Single-Camera Series	Nominated	
2016	Chris Bacon	Outstanding Music Composition for a Series	Nominated	

=== Television Critics Association Awards ===
Year	Nominee(s)	Category	Result	Ref(s)
2013	Vera Farmiga	Individual Achievement in Drama	Nominated	

=== Critics' Choice Television Awards ===
Year	Nominee(s)	Category	Result	Ref(s)
2013	Vera Farmiga	Best Actress in a Drama Series	Nominated	
2014	Vera Farmiga	Best Actress in a Drama Series	Nominated	
2014	Freddie Highmore	Best Actor in a Drama Series	Nominated	
2015	Freddie Highmore	Best Actor in a Drama Series	Nominated	
2015	Vera Farmiga	Best Actress in a Drama Series	Nominated	
2016	Bates Motel	Most Bingeworthy Series	Nominated	
2017	Freddie Highmore	Best Actor in a Drama Series	Nominated	

=== Casting Society of America ===
Year	Nominee(s)	Category	Result	Ref(s)
2013	April Webster, Sara Isaacson, Jennifer Page and Corinne Clark	Outstanding Achievement in Casting	Nominated	

=== Satellite Awards ===
Year	Nominee(s)	Category	Result	Ref(s)
2013	Freddie Highmore	Best Actor – Television Series Drama	Nominated	
2013	Vera Farmiga	Best Actress – Television Series Drama	Nominated	

=== Saturn Awards ===
Year	Nominee(s)	Category	Result	Ref(s)
2013	Bates Motel	Best Television Presentation	Nominated	
2013	Freddie Highmore	Best Actor on Television	Nominated	
2013	Vera Farmiga	Best Actress on Television	Won	
2014	Vera Farmiga	Best Actress on Television	Nominated	
2014	Bates Motel	Best Television Presentation	Nominated	
2015	Bates Motel	Best Action-Thriller Television Series	Nominated	
2016	Bates Motel	Best Action-Thriller Television Series	Nominated	
2016	Freddie Highmore	Best Actor on Television	Nominated	
2016	Vera Farmiga	Best Actress on Television	Nominated	

=== People's Choice Awards ===
Year	Nominee(s)	Category	Result	Ref(s)
2013	Freddie Highmore	Favorite TV Anti-Hero	Nominated	
2014	Bates Motel	Favorite Cable TV Drama	Nominated	
2015	Bates Motel	Favorite Cable TV Drama	Nominated	
2016	Bates Motel	Favorite Cable TV Drama	Won	
2016	Vera Farmiga	Favorite Cable TV Actress	Won	
2016	Freddie Highmore	Favorite Cable TV Actor	Won	

=== Imagen Awards ===
Year	Nominee(s)	Category	Result	Ref(s)
2013	Nestor Carbonell	Best Supporting Actor – Television	Nominated	
2014	Nestor Carbonell	Best Supporting Actor – Television	Nominated	

=== Make-Up Artists and Hair Stylists Guild ===
Year	Nominee(s)	Category	Result	Ref(s)
2013	Donna Bis	Best Contemporary Hairstyling – Television and New Media Series	Nominated	

=== Dorian Awards ===
Year	Nominee(s)	Category	Result	Ref(s)
2013	Vera Farmiga	TV Performance of the Year – Actress	Nominated	

=== Online Film & Television Association Awards ===
Year	Nominee(s)	Category	Result	Ref(s)
2013	John S. Bartley and Thomas Yatsko	Best Cinematography in a Series	Nominated	
2013	Peter Bodnarus, Mark S. Freeborn, Margot Ready and Rose Marie McSherry	Best Production Design in a Series	Nominated	
2013	Vera Farmiga	Best Actress in a Drama Series	Nominated	
2014	Vera Farmiga	Best Actress in a Drama Series	Nominated	
2014	Peter Bodnarus, Mark S. Freeborn, Tony Wohlgemuth, Margot Ready and Rose Marie McSherry	Best Production Design in a Series	Nominated	
2014	Chris Bacon	Best Music in a Series	Nominated	
2014	Alan Decker, Mark Noda, Nello Torri, Thomas DeGorter, Michael Mullane and Brian Armstrong	Best Sound in a Series	Nominated	
2014	Bates Motel	Best Drama Series	Nominated	
2015	Vera Farmiga	Best Supporting Actress in a Drama Series	Nominated	
2016	Chris Bacon	Best Music in a Series	Nominated	

=== Women's Image Network Awards ===
Year	Nominee(s)	Category	Result	Ref(s)
2013	Bates Motel	Best Drama Series	Nominated	
2013	Vera Farmiga	Best Actress – Drama Series	Nominated	
2014	Vera Farmiga	Best Actress – Drama Series	Nominated	
2014	Kerry Ehrin	Best Drama Series Produced by a Woman	Nominated	
2014	Bates Motel	Best Drama Series	Nominated	
2015	Bates Motel	Best Drama Series	Nominated	
2015	Vera Farmiga	Best Actress – Drama Series	Nominated	
2016	Vera Farmiga	Best Actress – Drama Series	Nominated	

=== Gracie Awards ===
Year	Nominee(s)	Category	Result	Ref(s)
2015	Vera Farmiga	Outstanding Female Actor in a Leading Role in a Drama	Won	

=== Golden Reel Awards ===
Year	Nominee(s)	Category	Result	Ref(s)
2015	Michael Ryan	Television – Short Form, Music	Nominated	

=== IGN Awards ===
Year	Nominee(s)	Category	Result	Ref(s)
2013	Vera Farmiga	Best TV Actress	Nominated	
2013	Bates Motel	Best New TV Series	Nominated	
2013	Bates Motel	Best TV Horror Series	Nominated	

=== Poppy Awards ===
Year	Nominee(s)	Category	Result	Ref(s)
2016	Vera Farmiga	Best Actress in a Drama Series	Nominated	

=== TV Guide Awards ===
Year	Nominee(s)	Category	Result	Ref(s)
2014	Bates Motel	Favorite Horror Series	Nominated	

=== Fangoria Chainsaw Awards ===
Year	Nominee(s)	Category	Result	Ref(s)
2015	Vera Farmiga	Best TV Actress	Nominated	
2016	Vera Farmiga	Best TV Actress	Nominated	
2016	Freddie Highmore	Best TV Actor	Nominated	

=== ACTRA Awards ===
Year	Nominee(s)	Category	Result	Ref(s)
2013	Vincent Gale	Best Actor	Nominated	
