= Texas Whatever =

- Friday Night Lights episode
- Episode no.: Season 5 Episode 12
- Directed by: Kyle Chandler
- Written by: Kerry Ehrin
- Cinematography by: Todd McMullen
- Editing by: Stephen Michael
- Original release dates: February 2, 2011 (DirecTV); July 8, 2011 (NBC)
- Running time: 43 minutes

Guest appearances
- Zach Gilford as Matt Saracen; Taylor Kitsch as Tim Riggins; Adrianne Palicki as Tyra Collette; Brad Leland as Buddy Garrity; Derek Phillips as Billy Riggins; Dana Wheeler-Nicholson as Angela Collette

Episode chronology
← Previous "The March"	Next → "Always"
- Friday Night Lights (season 5)

"Texas Whatever" is the twelfth episode of the fifth season of the American sports drama television series Friday Night Lights, inspired by the 1990 nonfiction book by H. G. Bissinger. It is the 75th overall episode of the series and was written by consulting producer Kerry Ehrin, and directed by main cast member Kyle Chandler. It originally aired on DirecTV's 101 Network on February 2, 2011, before airing on NBC on July 8, 2011.

The series is set in the fictional town of Dillon, a small, close-knit community in rural West Texas. It follows a high school football team, the Dillon Panthers. It features a set of characters, primarily connected to Coach Eric Taylor, his wife Tami, and their daughter Julie. In the episode, the future of the Lions is put into jeopardy as Dillon prepares to announce one single football team. Meanwhile, Eric and Tami question their future, while Tim considers leaving Texas.

According to Nielsen Media Research, the episode was seen by an estimated 3.01 million household viewers and gained a 0.7/3 ratings share among adults aged 18–49. The episode received critical acclaim, with critics praising the return of Matt and Tyra, performances and themes.

== Plot ==
Tami (Connie Britton) returns home from Philadelphia, and is surprised by the presence of Julie (Aimee Teegarden), who arrived early after finishing her exams. She tells Eric (Kyle Chandler) about the offer of Dean of Admissions, but Eric is not interested in leaving Texas. Luke (Matt Lauria) finally gets the opportunity of a football scholarship, but is not convinced about the college offering it. He is also mad at Becky (Madison Burge) as he thinks there is something between her and Tim (Taylor Kitsch), which she denies, stating she is not in love with him and just cares about him as a friend, but Luke does not believe her, upsetting her.

Billy (Derek Phillips) visits Tim at the bar to talk about their fight, and Tim reveals that he will move to Alaska to start a new life when his parole is over. Billy and Mindy (Stacey Oristano) have also discovered that Mindy that they are expecting twins. While Billy is ecstatic, Mindy is not exactly delighted at raising three children with their precarious financial situation. As Tim works, he is surprised to see Tyra (Adrianne Palicki), who is visiting to help Billy and Mindy. She tries to dissuade him from abandoning Texas, telling him he will regret losing Billy, who is the only family he ever had, but Tim is determined to leave his old life behind. Tyra also reconnects with Julie. As the two catch up, Julie admits that she misses Matt (Zach Gilford).

The Lions start trying to make a campaign to stay, as they await the results from the hearing to determine what will happen to the school program. This worries Jess (Jurnee Smollett), as she was hoping to eventually get enough experience to become a head coach herself. Buddy (Brad Leland) is warned by a former friend that the Panthers will become the official Dillon team and that he should jump on board. Eric is not disturbed by the possible outcome, but gets into an argument with Tami over their future. Eric is insistent on staying in Texas, while Tami wants to make a family decision that for once does not depend on Eric's football job.

The committee votes to dismantle the Lions program, making the Panthers the sole football team in Dillon. While Buddy is confident in their prospects, Eric states he will not go back with the Panthers. Both Vince and Jess are upset about losing their team and, as they comfort each other, they finally reconcile after Vince apologizes to Jess for his recent behaviour. After having sex, Tyra takes Tim to the landscape he planned to buy, questioning again his position about leaving. Matt shows up to surprise his grandmother at home for Christmas. At night, Buddy and the boosters from the Panthers visit Eric at home. While they enter, an upset Tami reminds Eric how she stood for him and did everything for him for the past 18 years.

== Production ==
=== Development ===
The episode was written by consulting producer Kerry Ehrin, and directed by main cast member Kyle Chandler. This was Ehrin's twelfth writing credit, and Chandler's first directing credit.

== Reception ==
=== Viewers ===
In its original American broadcast on NBC, "Texas Whatever" was seen by an estimated 3.01 million household viewers with a 0.7/3 in the 18–49 demographics. This means that 0.7 percent of all households with televisions watched the episode, while 3 percent of all of those watching television at the time of the broadcast watched it. This was a 22% increase in viewership from the previous episode, which was watched by an estimated 2.45 million household viewers with a 0.6/3 in the 18–49 demographics.

=== Critical reviews ===
"Texas Whatever" received critical acclaim. Keith Phipps of The A.V. Club gave the episode an "A" grade and wrote, "Next week will surely provide an answer to that and any other lingering questions. Hard to believe we're so near the end, but TV shows, like football teams, weren't meant to be together forever. One more episode. Then we'll take off the cleats and keep walking."

Alan Sepinwall of HitFix wrote, "I swear, this show is making me a wreck in these final episodes. It really is." Ken Tucker of Entertainment Weekly wrote, "We've already arrived at Friday Night Lights' penultimate episode. Titled “Texas Whatever” and directed by Kyle Chandler, it was a great episode that saw the return of Adrianne Palicki as Tyra, Zach Gilford as Matt, and some big, fundamental changes in life in Dillon, Tex."

Andy Greenwald of Vulture wrote, "In one week we'll find out who wins and who loses, who stays and who goes. But for now, let's be like Tinker: sitting in the grass, savoring the last hopeful moment." Alison Winn Scotch of Paste wrote, "I wish I didn't have to recap this episode. I wish that I could just give it a perfect 10 and let it bask in its perfection. I wish I could just tell you that for 42 minutes, my heart was in my throat, that I didn't wish that anything were done differently, that every nuance, every line, every song was TV at its best."

Jen Chaney of The Washington Post wrote, "I'm not going to focus our penultimate Friday Night Lights experience on analyzing the logic behind certain narrative developments. At least not entirely. The finale is almost here, and that means it's time to start getting teary and sentimental." Leigh Raines of TV Fanatic gave the episode a perfect 5 star out of 5 rating and wrote, "Double the Riglets, double the fun? Not in Mindy's eyes! The discovery that she's having twins was just one of many difficult revelations in "Texas Whatever," the penultimate episode of Friday Night Lights." Television Without Pity gave the episode an "A+" grade.
