= Jump the gun (disambiguation) =

Jump the Gun refers to a false start in athletics. It may refer also to:

== Music ==
- Jump the Gun (band), an Irish pop/rock band, best known for competing in the 1988 Eurovision Song Contest
- Jump the Gun (album), an album by Pretty Maids
- "Jump the Gun", a song by Gotthard from the album Bang!

== Other uses in popular culture ==
- Jump the Gun (film), 1997
- Jumping the Gun (Friday Night Lights), an episode aired during Season 2 of Friday Night Lights
