= Humble Pie (disambiguation) =

Humble Pie are an English rock band formed in 1969.

Humble Pie may also refer to:

- To eat humble pie, an English idiom
- Humble Pie (album), by Humble Pie, 1970
- "Humble Pie" (Doctors), a 2002 television episode
- "Humble Pie" (Friday Night Lights), a 2008 television episode
- "Humble Pie" (Trulli Tales), a 2017 television episode

== See also ==
- Humble Pi, an album by Homeboy Sandman & Edan
- Humble Pi: A comedy of maths errors, a book by Matt Parker
