= The Crazies (2010 film) =

Film by Breck Eisner

- Theatrical release poster
- Directed by: Breck Eisner
- Screenplay by: Scott Kosar; Ray Wright
- Based on: The Crazies by George A. Romero
- Produced by: Michael Aguilar; Dean Georgaris; Rob Cowan
- Starring: Timothy Olyphant; Radha Mitchell; Joe Anderson; Danielle Panabaker
- Cinematography: Maxime Alexandre
- Edited by: Billy Fox
- Music by: Mark Isham
- Production companies: Overture Films; Participant Media; Imagenation Abu Dhabi
- Distributed by: Overture Films; Participant Media (United States); Gulf Film (United Arab Emirates); Paramount Vantage (international)
- Release dates: February 23, 2010 (Los Angeles); February 26, 2010 (United States)
- Running time: 101 minutes
- Countries: United Arab Emirates; United States
- Language: English
- Budget: $20 million
- Box office: $54.8 million

The Crazies is a 2010 science fiction horror film directed by Breck Eisner and written by Scott Kosar and Ray Wright. A bilateral co-production between the United States and the United Arab Emirates, and the remake of the 1973 film of the same name, the film stars Timothy Olyphant, Radha Mitchell, Joe Anderson, and Danielle Panabaker. The film follows Sheriff David Dutten (Olyphant) and his pregnant wife Judy (Mitchell) as they struggle to survive an outbreak of an unknown biological agent that turns those infected into violent killers.

Although the film is set in the fictional town of Ogden Marsh, Iowa, principal photography commenced in Georgia in March 2009, with additional shooting taking place in Iowa. Brad Anderson was originally hired to direct the film, but dropped out due to creative differences with the studio. George A. Romero, who wrote and directed the original film, served as an executive producer on the remake.

The Crazies premiered in Los Angeles on February 23, 2010, and was theatrically released in the United States three days later. The film received positive reviews from critics and grossed $54.8 million against its $20 million production budget.

== Plot ==
In the town of Ogden Marsh, Iowa, resident Rory interrupts a local baseball game, entering the outfield with a shotgun. Sheriff David Dutten attempts to dissuade Rory but is forced to kill him when he raises his weapon. David's wife Judy, the community doctor, notices another resident, Bill, exhibiting bizarre behavior, including lifeless and repetitive speech. That night, Bill locks his wife and son inside their farmhouse and burns it down.

Following the discovery of a pilot's corpse in a swamp, David and his deputy Russell investigate the area. They discover a military aircraft that crashed into the river a few days before. Suspecting a link between the contaminated water and the residents' bizarre behavior, David urges Mayor Hobbs to shut off the town's drinking water supply. Hobbs refuses to authorize him, but David does so anyway. Responding to a disturbance at the morgue, David and Russell are attacked by the infected pathologist whom they kill with an electric saw.

Soon after, all communication services are cut off and soldiers arrive to quarantine all residents at the local high school. The residents are examined for symptoms of infection. Due to her pregnancy, Judy has an elevated temperature, is flagged as infected, and separated from David. Escaping quarantine, David returns to his office, encountering Russell. The pair head for the school to free Judy. At the school, the military personnel are unable to stop a large group of infected and evacuate, abandoning the site. Judy wakes up strapped to a gurney alongside several others. An infected Ben Sandborn enters with a pitchfork and begins killing the helpless people who are strapped to gurneys. David and Russell arrive in time to save Judy and Becca, her assistant.

The four make their way out of town on foot and witness soldiers killing Becca's boyfriend Scotty and his mother, then burn their bodies. David subdues a soldier and learns that the military has been ordered to shoot all civilians. They make it to David's house and begin fixing the patrol car in his garage. David is ambushed by Rory's infected wife Peggy and son Curt. David kills Peggy, and Russell shoots Curt through a window. Russell enters the room and shoots the pair's corpses multiple times, disturbing Judy.

David, Judy, Becca, and Russell flee in a car. On the road, they are spotted by an attack helicopter and drive into a car wash for cover. The infected carwash employees attack the car and drag Becca out by the neck with a hose, breaking her neck. When the rest of the group leaves the car to help Becca, the helicopter destroys the car.

While walking down the road, the group spots a black SUV speeding, which Russell disables with a police spike strip. The driver, a government employee, reveals that the cargo plane contained a Rhabdoviridae prototype and biological weapon called Trixie. It was en route to Texas to be destroyed when the plane crashed. Enraged, Russell shoots the driver and threatens the Duttens. David confronts him about his behavior, and Russell realizes he is infected. Russell begs to continue with them. At a military roadblock, Russell distracts the soldiers and tries to shoot at them but is killed. The Duttens sneak past and arrive at a truck stop to search for a vehicle, discovering that the military has also executed those who were evacuated. David also learns via radio that the military plans to destroy the town. After killing two infected hunters, they escape in a semi-truck. As they drive away, a massive explosion destroys Ogden Marsh and disables their truck, forcing them to continue on foot. A view from a military satellite highlights the couple and then the city, and the words "Initiate containment protocol" appear.

A semi-breaking up broadcast of a Cedar Rapids newscaster reports on the explosion in Ogden Marsh, stating a perimeter has been set and civilians are not being allowed into the area, then an infected's face unintentionally appears before the signal is lost.

== Cast ==
- Timothy Olyphant as David
- Radha Mitchell as Judy
- Joe Anderson as Russell
- Danielle Panabaker as Becca
- Christie Lynn Smith as Deardra Farnum
- Brett Rickaby as Bill Farnum
- Preston Bailey as Nicholas
- John Aylward as Mayor Hobbs
- Joe Reegan as Pvt. Billy Babcock
- Glenn Morshower as Intelligence Officer
- Larry Cedar as Ben Sandborn
- Gregory Sporleder as Travis Quinn
- Mike Hickman as Rory Hamill
- Lisa K. Wyatt as Peggy Hamill
- Justin Welborn as Curt Hamill

Lynn Lowry, who portrayed Kathy in the original film, makes a cameo appearance as an infected woman on a bicycle.

== Production ==
=== Development ===
Paramount Pictures was the first studio to attempt a remake of The Crazies, with reports surfacing in May 2004. Dean Georgaris and Michael Aguilar would produce under their Penn Station Entertainment banner while George A. Romero would serve as an executive producer. Scott Kosar, who had worked on the remakes of The Texas Chainsaw Massacre and The Amityville Horror, was hired to pen the script. The film was said to "update the storyline of the original". In March 2005, The Machinist director Brad Anderson was in talks to direct the film. By April, Anderson was officially on board as director. Anderson and Kosar aimed to make a film that did not feel "derivative" of the original film as well as 28 Days Later, which the former felt "set a new standard for zombie films". Creative differences with the studio would ultimately result in Anderson leaving the film.

In February 2008, the project was revived after Rogue Pictures picked up the film. Breck Eisner was to direct while Ray Wright, credited screenwriter of Pulse, was drafting a new script. The film was later moved to Overture Films by October.

=== Casting ===
In November 2008, Timothy Olyphant was cast in the lead role as the town's sheriff. Radha Mitchell joined the cast the following January, while Danielle Panabaker and Joe Anderson boarded the film in March.

=== Filming ===
Principal production began on March 5, 2009, in Georgia, with settings including the Georgia National Fairgrounds and Priester's Pecans in Perry, Georgia, the Fountain Car Wash in Macon, Georgia, areas in Dublin, Georgia, Peach County High School in Fort Valley, Georgia, and areas of Cordele, Georgia. Additional filming was done in Lenox, Iowa. The special effects were created by Robert Green Hall.

=== Makeup ===
The final stage of the Trixie disease took three hours in the make-up chair to complete.

The makeup for the film was designed by Almost Human Studios; they also did makeup for other horror films such as Quarantine, Frankenfish, and Prom Night. Director Breck Eisner's early visions of the infected were zombies. He and the makeup crew made many molds and sketches of the infected, with deformities and skin sloughing. Eventually, he grew tired of the cliche "zombie" look, and went with a realistic "go under the skin," in which the blood vessels appear to be bursting forth and face and neck muscles and tendons tight and wrought. Eisner described this look as "hyper alive."

The director's one and only rule for the makeup design—they research in medical books and consult medical professionals for the design of the infected. Lead make-up artist Rob Hall said "If we were to pitch something to Breck, about, if you know, one side of his face should look like this, Breck would immediately want to know what disease it came from, and what version of reality it could be implemented into Trixie. But the most important thing was to make sure it felt real. Make it feel like you could get it, too." The basis of the makeup the crew used was mainly rabies, tetanus, and Stevens–Johnson syndrome.

Each "Crazy" design had about twenty-one sections requiring over three hours to apply for the final effect seen in the film. Robert stated the final effect in the film seen was not just the makeup, but the lighting, camera angles, and post-production effects. The theme for the design was "stress." He stated he wanted the "Crazies" to look stressed. The veins and eyes were the main focus of the design. The contact lenses covered the actors' entire eyes and required eye-drops every five minutes to reduce injuries.

== Release ==
The film premiered on February 23, 2010, in Los Angeles and received a wide release in the North America on February 26, 2010. The film opened with $16 million, at #3 behind Cop Out and Shutter Island. By May 2010, the film has grossed an estimated $50 million worldwide. The Canadian DVD and Blu-ray Disc were released June 29, 2010. The DVD and Blu-ray Disc + Digital Copy combo pack was released in the North America on June 29, 2010, and in the United Kingdom on July 19.

== Reception ==
On review aggregator Rotten Tomatoes, the film has an approval rating of 72% based on 155 reviews, and an average rating of 6.3/10. The site's critical consensus reads, "Tense, nicely shot, and uncommonly intelligent, The Crazies is a horror remake that, unusually, works." On Metacritic, which assigns a rating to reviews, the film has an average score of 56 out of 100 based on 31 critics, indicating "mixed or average reviews". Audiences polled by CinemaScore gave the film an average grade of "B−" on an A+ to F scale.

Michael Phillips of The Chicago Tribune awarded the film 3½ stars of 4, adding he "greatly prefer this cleverly sustained and efficiently relentless remake to the '73 edition. It is lean and simple." Eric M. Armstrong of The Moving Arts Film Journal states "The Crazies is a solid B-movie and one of the few remakes surpassing the original." Ty Burr of The Boston Globe gave the film 3/4 stars touting the film as "extremely solid stuff – about as good as you could hope from a B-movie re-tread." Variety film critic Dennis Harvey states it "emerges an above-average genre piece equal parts horror-meller and doomsday action thriller".

However, Owen Gleiberman of Entertainment Weekly graded the film a C, adding "I don't care how this premise is dressed, we saw it a jillion times." Mike Hale of The New York Times states "The filmmakers seem so determined to make a serious respectable horror movie, they have only the bare minimum of fun." Amy Biancolli, writing for San Francisco Chronicle states the re-make "boasts less of the plot and fewer characters than the original, but the hairdos are spiffier and the special effects graduated from cheapo stage blood to the extravagant gross-outs horror audiences expect."

At the People's Choice Awards, the film was nominated for Favorite Horror Movie. Rotten Tomatoes lists the film on its 100 Best Zombie Movies, Ranked by Tomatometer.

== Merchandise ==
A motion comic was released on February 17, 2010 via iTunes. A four-issue comic book miniseries was also released chronicling how the virus' spread. The next week, an iPhone app, Beware the Infected, was released, and Starz Digital Media released a Facebook game.

== See also ==
- The Crazies (1973 film)
