= Who Do You Think You Are? (Friday Night Lights) =

- Friday Night Lights episode
- Episode no.: Season 2 Episode 12
- Directed by: Michael Waxman
- Written by: Kerry Ehrin
- Cinematography by: Todd McMullen
- Editing by: Louise A. Innes
- Original release date: January 18, 2008
- Running time: 43 minutes

Guest appearances
- Brad Leland as Buddy Garrity; Matt Czuchry as Chris Kennedy; Francis Capra as Devin Diablo; Kevin Rankin as Herc; Daniella Alonso as Carlotta Alonso; Benny Ciaramello as Santiago Herrera; Jana Kramer as Noelle Davenport

Episode chronology
← Previous "Jumping the Gun"	Next → "Humble Pie"
- Friday Night Lights (season 2)

"Who Do You Think You Are?" is the twelfth episode of the second season of the American sports drama television series Friday Night Lights, inspired by the 1990 nonfiction book by H. G. Bissinger. It is the 34th overall episode of the series and was written by consulting producer Kerry Ehrin, and directed by Michael Waxman. It originally aired on NBC on January 18, 2008.

The series is set in the fictional town of Dillon, a small, close-knit community in rural West Texas. It follows a high school football team, the Dillon Panthers. It features a set of characters, primarily connected to Coach Eric Taylor, his wife Tami, and their daughter Julie. In the episode, the Taylors re-consider putting Gracie at a daycare. Meanwhile, Lyla starts collaborating on a radio talk show, while Smash and Matt see challenges in their respective relationships.

According to Nielsen Media Research, the episode was seen by an estimated 5.33 million household viewers and gained a 1.9 ratings share among adults aged 18–49. The episode received mixed-to-negative reviews from critics, who criticized the writing and handling of its subject matters.

== Plot ==
Eric (Kyle Chandler) and Tami (Connie Britton) start searching for daycares for Gracie, but Tami is not convinced on the available options. Meanwhile, Matt (Zach Gilford) is devastated when he learns that Carlotta (Daniella Alonso) is going back to Guatemala.

Noelle (Jana Kramer) invites Smash (Gaius Charles) and his family to dine with her family. However, the dinner takes an awry turn when Noelle's parents express disapproval of their interracial relationship due to the Texan perception, something that Corrina (Liz Mikel) also believes. This causes friction between Smash and his mother, who tells him that his relationship with Noelle is over. Later, she allows Smash to take his sister to the movies. However, his sister is disappointed when she learns that Smash used her to meet with Noelle at the theater. During the screening, white men harass his sister and mock Smash's relationship, prompting him to hit one of them and they leave. Smash apologizes to his sister, but asks her not to tell their mother.

At school, Santiago (Benny Ciaramello) is approached by Devin Diablo (Francis Capra), a former inmate in prison. He starts hanging out with Devin and his friends outside the apartment, with Buddy (Brad Leland) inviting them inside. Nevertheless, Buddy confides in the Taylors that he fears if any of his possessions are stolen. While Buddy is not home, Santiago hosts a party at the apartment. When everyone leaves and he is cleaning, he discovers that Buddy's priced family gold watch was stolen. He confronts Devil, who denies taking it and tells him that Buddy does not care for him beyond his football prospects. They get into a fight, and Santiago leaves with Buddy's watch. He returns to the apartment, apologizing to Buddy, who consoles him.

Lyla (Minka Kelly) participates on a Christian radio talk show, hosted by Chris Kennedy (Matt Czuchry), helping him answering questions from phone callers. While visiting Jason (Scott Porter) and Herc (Kevin Rankin), Tim (Taylor Kitsch) makes prank calls to the talk show. That night, Lyla confronts Tim over his phone calls, admonishing him for humiliating her. Tim decides to finally move forward with his feelings for her, and goes to the station to give her flowers. However, he runs into Lyla and Chris sharing a kiss, causing a heartbroken Tim to leave the flowers nearby and exit the station.

Matt tries to convince Carlotta to stay, but she states that she needs to be with her family. Nevertheless, Matt accompanies her to a quinceañera, and Carlotta leaves one day early. With no available daycare, Tami decides to bring Gracie to school, which causes problems for Eric and Julie (Aimee Teegarden). Tami considers quitting her job to stay at home with Gracie, but Eric persuades her not to do it. The following day, the Taylors leave Gracie at a daycare.

== Production ==
=== Development ===
In December 2007, NBC announced that the twelfth episode of the season would be titled "Who Do You Think You Are?". The episode was written by consulting producer Kerry Ehrin, and directed by Michael Waxman. This was Ehrin's sixth writing credit, and Waxman's first directing credit.

== Reception ==
=== Viewers ===
In its original American broadcast, "Who Do You Think You Are?" was seen by an estimated 5.33 million household viewers with a 1.9 in the 18–49 demographics. This means that 1.9 percent of all households with televisions watched the episode. It finished 57th out of 91 programs airing from January 14–20, 2008. This was a 9% decrease in viewership from the previous episode, which was watched by an estimated 5.80 million household viewers with a 1.8 in the 18–49 demographics.

=== Critical reviews ===
"Who Do You Think You Are?" received mixed-to-negative reviews from critics. In a positive review, Eric Goldman of IGN gave the episode a "great" 8 out of 10 and wrote, "This was one of the better episodes of the season, interweaving several dramatic storylines to (mostly) strong effect."

Scott Tobias of The A.V. Club gave the episode a "C+" grade and wrote, "there's some bravery, too, in taking on the thorny issue of interracial relationships, which leads to some tension between the older and younger generation of both races, with the elders uncertain that the culture has gotten beyond the stigma. But there's ambition and there's execution, and 'Who Do You Think You Are?' fell considerably short of the mark. There's a fine line between exploding stereotypes and indulging in them for a (well-meaning) point, and the show tread on the wrong side of that line all night." Ken Tucker of Entertainment Weekly wrote, "This episode was all over the place, quality-wise, and you know I'm writing this from the place of Friday Night Lights Is The Show We Love To Love, right?"

Alan Sepinwall wrote, "The ideas behind all these scenarios were fine, but the execution of most was as subtle as an air horn." Casey Marsella of TV Guide wrote, "Some people may think this episode was dated, but in the real and present world, race and gender still matter to many. I liked how this episode touched on those issues."

Andrew Johnston of Slant Magazine wrote, "Compared to a lot of fans and commentators, I think I've been pretty charitable toward the second season of Friday Night Lights, but charity has its limits: 'Who Do You Think You Are?' is a flat-out clunker, a trite, soapy episode that's easily the worst of the season to date and in the running for the lamest-ever episode of the series." Rick Porter of Zap2it wrote, "Tonight was Relationship Turning Point Night on Friday Night Lights. Some of it - Coach and Mrs. Coach, as always - was poignant and beautifully acted, and some of it, well, it went on a little thick."

Brett Love of TV Squad wrote, "All the makings of a really good episode were there, but the execution just felt a bit off. I am left wondering if part of that can't be blamed on the strike. Perhaps some of those bits that were a little rough around the edges could have been smoothed had they had the opportunity to reshoot to add or change things? Or maybe it was just a bit of an off week." Television Without Pity gave the episode a "C" grade.
