= There Goes the Neighborhood (Friday Night Lights) =

- Friday Night Lights episode
- Episode no.: Season 2 Episode 10
- Directed by: Jeffrey Reiner
- Written by: David Hudgins
- Cinematography by: Todd McMullen
- Editing by: Ron Rosen
- Original release date: January 4, 2008
- Running time: 43 minutes

Guest appearances
- Jessalyn Gilsig as Shelley Hayes; Brad Leland as Buddy Garrity; Daniella Alonso as Carlotta Alonso; Benny Ciaramello as Santiago Herrera; Jana Kramer as Noelle Davenport; Taylor Nichols as Kevin

Episode chronology
← Previous "The Confession"	Next → "Jumping the Gun"
- Friday Night Lights (season 2)

"There Goes the Neighborhood" is the tenth episode of the second season of the American sports drama television series Friday Night Lights, inspired by the 1990 nonfiction book by H. G. Bissinger. It is the 32nd overall episode of the series and was written by supervising producer David Hudgins and directed by executive producer Jeffrey Reiner. It originally aired on NBC on January 4, 2008.

The series is set in the fictional town of Dillon, a small, close-knit community in rural West Texas. It follows a high school football team, the Dillon Panthers. It features a set of characters, primarily connected to Coach Eric Taylor, his wife Tami, and their daughter Julie. In the episode, Dillon is forced to share part of the field with a rival school following a tornado. Meanwhile, Tim moves in with the Taylors, while Landry questions his future with Tyra.

According to Nielsen Media Research, the episode was seen by an estimated 5.53 million household viewers and gained a 1.8 ratings share among adults aged 18–49. The episode received very positive reviews from critics, who deemed it a return to form after a shaky start to the season.

== Plot ==
Tim (Taylor Kitsch) has moved in with the Taylors, just as a tornado hits Texas. As he and Julie (Aimee Teegarden) go to a supermarket, they see a news report that confirms a tornado alert in Dillon. Tim sees the tornado forming just outside the store, and he covers Julie inside as the tornado makes landfall.

While Dillon is mostly unaffected, Laribee is severely damaged, so the high school football team is allowed to use Dillon's campus despite their rivalry. Even though Eric (Kyle Chandler) and the Laribee coach, Donald Dickes (Brian Thornton), want to maintain peace, the teams often conflict outside the field. These include the Panthers' locker room being vandalized, as well as some other cruel pranks. Tami (Connie Britton) gets into an argument with Shelley (Jessalyn Gilsig), accusing her of never growing up, deeming it the main reason why she is still single. Tami is also not content with Tim's presence in the house, especially when Eric spends a lot of time with him. Buddy (Brad Leland) is dismayed when Lyla (Minka Kelly) reveals that Pam (Merrilee McCommas) is marrying Kevin (Taylor Nichols). He meets with Pam, promising to be a better husband, but Pam says she is moving on.

Landry and Tyra (Adrianne Palicki) adjust to life after the case is closing. While talking, Landry takes her hand, frightening Tyra into leaving. When Landry asks her to accompany him to an upcoming dance, she says she already has a date. Seeing her chatting with a Laribee player, Landry asks to talk to her. When the player turns aggressive, Landry punches him, prompting a brawl in the cafeteria between the Panthers and Laribee. When Tim confronts Laribee of urinating on their equipment, Donald restrains him, prompting a furious Eric to shove Donald against the wall, warning him to never touch any of his players ever again.

Julie advises Landry on giving up on Tyra, but Landry refuses and decides to go to the dance to meet her. She finds Tyra alone, who apologizes for her behavior. She says that her feelings for him were very strong and she needs time to process everything. Landry is unconvinced, feeling tired of not knowing how to change her mind and leaves. At a party, Tim finds a drunk Julie with another boy, who tries to get her drunk to have sex with her. Tim intimidates the man into leaving, and gets Julie back home. As he puts her in bed, Eric walks in. Believing that Tim was trying to have sex with her, Eric angrily kicks him out of the house.

== Production ==
=== Development ===
In December 2007, NBC announced that the tenth episode of the season would be titled "There Goes the Neighborhood". The episode was written by supervising producer David Hudgins, and directed by executive producer Jeffrey Reiner. This was Hudgins' fifth writing credit, and Reiner's 12th directing credit.

== Reception ==
=== Viewers ===
In its original American broadcast, "There Goes the Neighborhood" was seen by an estimated 5.53 million household viewers with a 1.8 in the 18–49 demographics. This means that 1.8 percent of all households with televisions watched the episode. This was a 7% increase in viewership from the previous episode, which was watched by an estimated 5.14 million household viewers with a 1.8 in the 18–49 demographics.

=== Critical reviews ===
"There Goes the Neighborhood" received very positive reviews from critics. Eric Goldman of IGN gave the episode a "great" 8 out of 10 and wrote, "Overall this was one of the best episodes of the show this season, also featuring more solid and sad material related to Buddy, who found out Pam was getting remarried and emotionally and pathetically begged her to take him back. I'm vexed by yet another episode missing Jason but there are definitely some signs that Friday Night Lights is getting back on track after a very choppy start to the season."

Scott Tobias of The A.V. Club gave the episode an "A–" grade and wrote, "the magic of 'There Goes The Neighborhood' is that it doesn't forget the past entirely, yet still functions as one of the season's most confident and satisfying episodes to date."

Alan Sepinwall wrote, "I don't know that the show's ever going to get back to the creative heights of season one, but at this moment in time, even slightly overcooked Friday Night Lights is like a feast for a starving man." Leah Friedman of TV Guide wrote, "This was probably the most Tim-centric episode since last season, and certainly showed how far he's come since then. What's that saying? The road to hell is paved with good intentions?"

Andrew Johnston of Slant Magazine wrote, "The concept of the 'good jumping on point' episode means less and less in this age of downloads and rapid-turnaround DVD releases, but 'There Goes the Neighborhood' is nonetheless an episode that functions as such ideally. It's not one of the finest FNL episodes ever, but it strikes a terrific balance between Taylor family drama, heartfelt high school soapiness and actual football. All told, it's one of the best episodes of the second season yet because, in many ways, it feels so casual." Rick Porter of Zap2it wrote, "The problems that the show was having before its year-end hiatus remain - the Incident is in the background, but it makes enjoying Funny Landry a little more difficult to be comfortable watching. And a couple of tonight's situations felt too TV-contrived for what the show does best. But the dialogue sang, there were several laugh-out-loud lines, and I'm generally left with a nice, warm feeling."

Brett Love of TV Squad wrote, "So, as has been the case for the whole season, I'm still not on board with the Tyra and Landry story. At this point though, I'm willing to roll with it to get to the rest of the characters. There is still plenty of story to be had in Dillon. A fact that is all the more apparent given the current landscape of our prime time schedules." Television Without Pity gave the episode a "B–" grade.

Taylor Kitsch submitted this episode for consideration for Outstanding Supporting Actor in a Drama Series at the 60th Primetime Emmy Awards.
