= The Machinist =

2004 film by Brad Anderson

- Theatrical release poster
- Directed by: Brad Anderson
- Written by: Scott Kosar
- Produced by: Julio Fernández
- Starring: Christian Bale; Jennifer Jason Leigh; Aitana Sánchez-Gijón; John Sharian; Michael Ironside
- Cinematography: Xavi Giménez
- Edited by: Luis de la Madrid
- Music by: Roque Baños
- Production companies: Castelao Producciones; Canal+; ICAA ICF
- Distributed by: Paramount Classics (United States); Filmax (Spain); Tartan Films (United Kingdom); CTV International (France)
- Release dates: 18 January 2004 (Sundance); 3 December 2004 (United States); 17 December 2004 (Spain)
- Running time: 102 minutes
- Countries: Spain; United Kingdom; United States; France
- Language: English
- Budget: $5 million
- Box office: $8.2 million

The Machinist is a 2004 psychological thriller film directed by Brad Anderson and written by Scott Kosar. It stars Christian Bale as the title character, a machinist struggling with paranoia and delusion after being unable to sleep for an entire year. Jennifer Jason Leigh, Aitana Sánchez-Gijón, John Sharian, and Michael Ironside appear in supporting roles.

The film drew attention due to Bale's commitment, having lost 62 pounds (28 kg) in preparation for his role. Upon release, The Machinist was well received by critics, with praise for Bale's performance, and grossed $8.2 million on a $5 million budget. In later years it has gained a cult status.

== Plot ==
Trevor Reznik is a machinist whose insomnia has led to him becoming emaciated and a loner. His coworkers eventually turn against him when he is involved in an accident that causes his coworker Miller to lose his left arm; Trevor was distracted by an unfamiliar coworker named Ivan. However, no one at the factory knows of Ivan and there are no records of him. Trevor finds comfort in the arms of Stevie, a prostitute, and with Maria, a waitress at an airport diner he frequents. He is haunted by flashes of recurring imagery, and things such as his car cigarette lighter take on a menacing air. A mysterious series of post-it notes appears on his refrigerator, depicting a game of hangman.

These vague incidents send him further into paranoia. Nonetheless, he attempts to establish a relationship with Maria. Meeting her at an amusement park, he goes with her son Nicholas on a dark ride. The ride begins to show increasingly disturbing images until its flashing lights cause Nicholas to suffer an epileptic seizure. Trevor suspects that the bizarre events are a concerted effort to drive him insane, as do recurring clues, such as a photo of Ivan fishing with Trevor's coworker Reynolds, which he takes as proof that Ivan exists. Another near-accident at work causes Trevor to lash out at his coworkers; as a result, he is fired. Increasingly distracted and alienated, Trevor forgets to pay his utility bills and his electricity is disconnected.

Trevor tries to trace Ivan's license plate. When a DMV clerk insists that personal information cannot be released unless a crime has been committed, he throws himself in front of a car in order to accuse Ivan of committing a hit and run. He files a police report with Ivan's plate number, only to be told that the car in question is his own, and he had reported it totaled one year ago. He goes to Stevie but discovers the fishing photo of Ivan and Reynolds framed in her home. He accuses her of conspiring against him with Ivan. Confused, Stevie says the picture is of Reynolds and Trevor fishing, but throws him out after he insults her. Trevor goes to the airport diner for Maria, but is told that they've never had an employee named Maria. The waitress there says she has served Trevor every day for a year, and, in all that time, he spoke so little that she thought he was mute.

Trevor goes back home and sees Ivan take Nicholas into Trevor's apartment. Inside, Nicholas is nowhere to be seen. Ivan tells him "you know he's dead." Trevor, believing Ivan has killed Nicholas and his body is in the bathtub, kills Ivan, only to find the bathtub empty. He opens his refrigerator, which is leaking blood, to find rotting fish, matching those in the fishing photo, which he at last realizes was of himself with Reynolds, as Stevie had claimed; Trevor hallucinated Ivan in the photo. Trevor takes a rolled-up carpet containing Ivan's body to the ocean to dispose of it, only for the rug to unroll and reveal nothing inside. Ivan, unharmed, approaches Trevor, and laughs.

Back home, Trevor remembers that one year prior, when healthy, he ran over and killed a boy (Nicholas) after taking his eyes off the road to use the car's cigarette lighter, witnessed by the boy's mother (Maria). Trevor fled the scene, and the resulting guilt became the root of his insomnia, emaciation, and repressed memories. Ivan was a figment of Trevor's imagination, a manifestation of his guilt. He fills the missing letters on the hangman note, spelling out "killer". The next day, he briefly considers going to the airport to escape, but instead drives to the police, accompanied by Ivan, who bids him an approving farewell. Trevor enters the station and confesses to the hit-and-run. Police officers escort Trevor to a cell, where he's able to sleep for the first time in a year.

== Cast ==
- Christian Bale as Trevor Reznik
- Jennifer Jason Leigh as Stevie
- Aitana Sánchez-Gijón as Maria
- John Sharian as Ivan
- Michael Ironside as Miller
- Lawrence Gilliard Jr. as Jackson (as Larry Gilliard)
- Reg E. Cathey as Jones
- Anna Massey as Mrs. Shrike
- Matthew Romero as Nicholas
- Robert Long as Supervisor Furman
- Colin Stinton as Inspector Rogers
- Craig Stevenson as Tucker
- James DePaul as Reynolds (uncredited)

== Production ==
Bale lost more than 62 pounds (28 kg) for his role.

Despite its setting in California, the film was shot in its entirety in and around Barcelona, Spain. It was produced by the Fantastic Factory label of Filmax and Castelao Productions.

Christian Bale strenuously dieted for over four months prior to filming, as his character needed to look drastically thin. According to a biography of Bale written by his former assistant, this daily diet consisted of "water, an apple and one cup of coffee per day, with the occasional whiskey" (approximately 55–260 calories). According to the DVD commentary, he lost 62 pounds (28 kg), reducing his body weight to 120 pounds (54 kg). Bale wanted to continue down to 99 pounds (45 kg), but the filmmakers would not allow it due to health concerns. In fact, the target weight to which the 6 ft (183 cm) Bale dropped was intended for a much shorter actor, but Bale insisted on seeing if he could make it anyway. At the end of filming he was left with just six weeks to regain enough mass to be ready for the screen test for his role in Batman Begins, which he achieved through weightlifting and binging on pizzas and ice cream.

Brad Anderson hurt his back during filming and directed much of the film while lying on a gurney.

The name Trevor Reznik is derived from Trent Reznor, the founder and primary creative force behind the industrial rock band Nine Inch Nails, and the original script had Nine Inch Nails lyrics on the first page. Other Nine Inch Nails tributes include early press articles describing Reznik as experiencing a "downward spiral".

However, the strongest literary influence is the Russian novelist Fyodor Dostoevsky. In the DVD commentary, writer Scott Kosar states that he was influenced by Dostoevsky's novel The Double.

- The character Reznik is shown reading Dostoevsky's The Idiot early in the film.
- When Reznik is riding the "Route 666" attraction, one of the faux marquees reads Crime and Punishment.
- The number plate Reznik is reading from the red convertible (743 CRN) is the reverse of his Dodge (NRC 347).
- In Dostoevsky's The Brothers Karamazov, the character who is visited by a devil is named Ivan. In the 1969 film, Ivan and his devil are played by the same actor (Kirill Lavrov). At the end of the film, as Reznik is sitting in his cell, he's wearing a t-shirt reading "Justice Brothers".

== Reception ==
=== Box office ===
The Machinist opened on 22 October 2004 in three theatres in North America and grossed $64,661 with an average of $21,553 per theatre ranking 45th at the box office. The film's widest release was 72 theatres and it grossed $1,082,715 in North America and $7,120,520 in other countries for a total of $8,203,235.

=== Critical response ===
The Machinist has a score of 77% on Rotten Tomatoes based on 142 reviews and an average rating of 6.6/10. The critical consensus states: "Brad Anderson's dark psychological thriller about a sleepless factory worker is elevated by Christian Bale's astonishingly committed performance." On Metacritic the film has a score of 61 based on reviews from 32 critics, indicating "generally favorable reviews".

Roger Ebert gave the film three stars out of four and stated in his review for the film:

The director Brad Anderson, working from a screenplay by Scott Kosar, wants to convey a state of mind, and he and Bale do that with disturbing effectiveness. The photography by Xavi Gimenez and Charlie Jiminez is cold slates, blues and grays, the palate of despair. We see Trevor's world so clearly through his eyes that only gradually does it occur to us that every life is seen through a filter. We get up in the morning in possession of certain assumptions through which all of our experiences must filter. We cannot be rid of those assumptions, although an evolved person can at least try to take them into account. Most people never question their assumptions, and so reality exists for them as they think it does, whether it does or not. Some assumptions are necessary to make life bearable, such as the assumption that we will not die in the next 10 minutes. Others may lead us, as they lead Trevor, into a bleak solitude. Near the end of the movie, we understand him when he simply says, "I just want to sleep."

== See also ==
- List of Spanish films of 2004
- Fatal insomnia and Creutzfeldt-Jakob disease
- Insomnia (2002)
- A Beautiful Mind (2001)
- Memento (2000)
