= Bates Motel (TV series) =

2013 American drama thriller television series

- Genre: Mystery; Psychological horror; Drama
- Based on: Characters from Psycho by Robert Bloch
- Developed by: Carlton Cuse; Kerry Ehrin; Anthony Cipriano
- Starring: Vera Farmiga; Freddie Highmore; Max Thieriot; Olivia Cooke; Nicola Peltz; Nestor Carbonell; Kenny Johnson
- Composer: Chris Bacon
- Country of origin: United States
- Original language: English
- No. of seasons: 5
- No. of episodes: 50 (list of episodes)

Production
- Executive producers: Mark Wolper; Roy Lee; John Powers Middleton; Kerry Ehrin; Carlton Cuse; Vera Farmiga; Tucker Gates
- Producers: Justis Greene; Steve Kornacki; Alyson Evans; Scott Kosar; Erica Lipez; Christopher Nelson; Tim Southam; Jamie Kaye Wheeler; Cory Bird
- Production locations: Vancouver, British Columbia
- Cinematography: Thomas Yatsko; John S. Bartley
- Editors: Christopher Nelson; Sarah Boyd; Ryan Neatha Johnson; Vikash Patel; Edward Warschilka
- Running time: 40–47 minutes
- Production companies: Cuse Productions (Note: First credited as American Genre in 2013, and later Carlton Cuse Productions from 2014 to 2015.); Kerry Ehrin Productions; Universal Television

Original release
- Network: A&E
- Release: March 18, 2013 – April 24, 2017

Bates Motel is an American psychological horror drama television series based on characters from the 1959 novel Psycho by Robert Bloch that aired on A&E from March 18, 2013, to April 24, 2017. It was developed by Carlton Cuse, Kerry Ehrin, and Anthony Cipriano.

A "contemporary prequel" to Alfred Hitchcock's 1960 film Psycho, it depicts the lives of Norman Bates (Freddie Highmore) and his mother Norma (Vera Farmiga) prior to the events portrayed in the film, albeit in a different fictional town (White Pine Bay, Oregon, as opposed to Fairvale, California) and in a modern-day setting. However, the final season loosely adapts the plot of the novel Psycho. Max Thieriot and Olivia Cooke both starred as part of the main cast throughout the series's run. After recurring in the first season, Néstor Carbonell was added to the main cast from season two onward. Both Nicola Peltz and Kenny Johnson had main cast roles at different points throughout the series’s run.

The series begins in Arizona with the death of Norma's husband, after which Norma purchases the Seafairer motel located in a coastal Oregon town so that she and Norman can start a new life. Subsequent seasons follow Norman as his mental illness becomes dangerous, and Norma as she struggles to protect her son, and those around him, from himself. The series was filmed outside Vancouver in Aldergrove, British Columbia, along with other locations within the Fraser Valley of British Columbia.

A&E chose to skip a pilot of the series, opting to go straight-to-series by ordering a 10-episode first season. Bates Motel is the longest-running original scripted drama series in the channel's history. The series's lead actors, Vera Farmiga and Freddie Highmore, received particular praise for their performances in the series, with the former receiving a Primetime Emmy Award nomination and winning a Saturn Award for Best Actress on Television. Bates Motel also won three People's Choice Awards for Favorite Cable TV Drama, and for Favorite Cable TV Actress (Farmiga) and Actor (Highmore).

== Series overview ==
Season	Episodes	Originally released	
Season	Episodes	First released	Last released
1	10	March 18, 2013	May 20, 2013
2	10	March 3, 2014	May 5, 2014
3	10	March 9, 2015	May 11, 2015
4	10	March 7, 2016	May 16, 2016
5	10	February 20, 2017	April 24, 2017

=== Season 1 ===
The first season follows Norma and Norman Bates as they buy a motel after Norman's father dies. On one of the first nights of the two owning the motel, the former owner breaks in and rapes Norma. Norman knocks the attacker out, and Norma stabs him to death. She decides it is best not to call the police and to cover up the murder. She and Norman dispose of the body. Norman complicates the cover-up by keeping a belt that belonged to the victim. When the town sheriff and his deputy notice that a man has gone missing, Norma and Norman must keep them from digging too far.

=== Season 2 ===
The second season follows the aftermath of Norman's teacher's murder, as her mysterious past comes to light. Meanwhile, Norma finds herself making dangerous decisions in order to keep the motel running and preventing the impending bypass. Bradley's search for her father's killer leads to the extremes, and Dylan learns the disturbing truth about his parentage.

=== Season 3 ===
The third season focuses on Norman's waning deniability about what is happening to him, and the lengths he will go to, to gain control of his fragile psyche. The dramatic events of last season leave Norma more aware of her son's mental fragility and fearful of what he is capable of. Meanwhile, Sheriff Romero begins to distance himself from the Bates family after he suspects Norma is lying to him about her husband's death.

=== Season 4 ===
The fourth season follows Norma as she becomes increasingly fearful of Norman, going to great lengths to find him the professional help he needs. This complicates their once unbreakable trust as Norman struggles to maintain his grip on reality. Meanwhile, Sheriff Romero once again finds himself drawn into Norma and Norman's lives. He agrees to marry Norma because his insurance will enable her to place Norman in an expensive psychiatric hospital.

=== Season 5 ===
The fifth season begins two years after the death of Norma. Publicly happy and well-adjusted, Norman struggles at home, where his blackouts are increasing and "Mother" threatens to take him over completely. Meanwhile, Dylan and Emma find themselves drawn back into Norman's world, and Romero hungers for revenge against his stepson.

== Cast and characters ==
- Vera Farmiga as Norma Louise Bates
- Freddie Highmore as Norman Bates
- Max Thieriot as Dylan Massett
- Olivia Cooke as Emma Decody
- Nicola Peltz as Bradley Martin (seasons 1–2; guest season 3)
- Nestor Carbonell as Sheriff Alex Romero (seasons 2–5; recurring season 1)
- Kenny Johnson as Caleb Calhoun (season 3; recurring seasons 2, 5; guest season 4)

== Production ==
=== Development ===
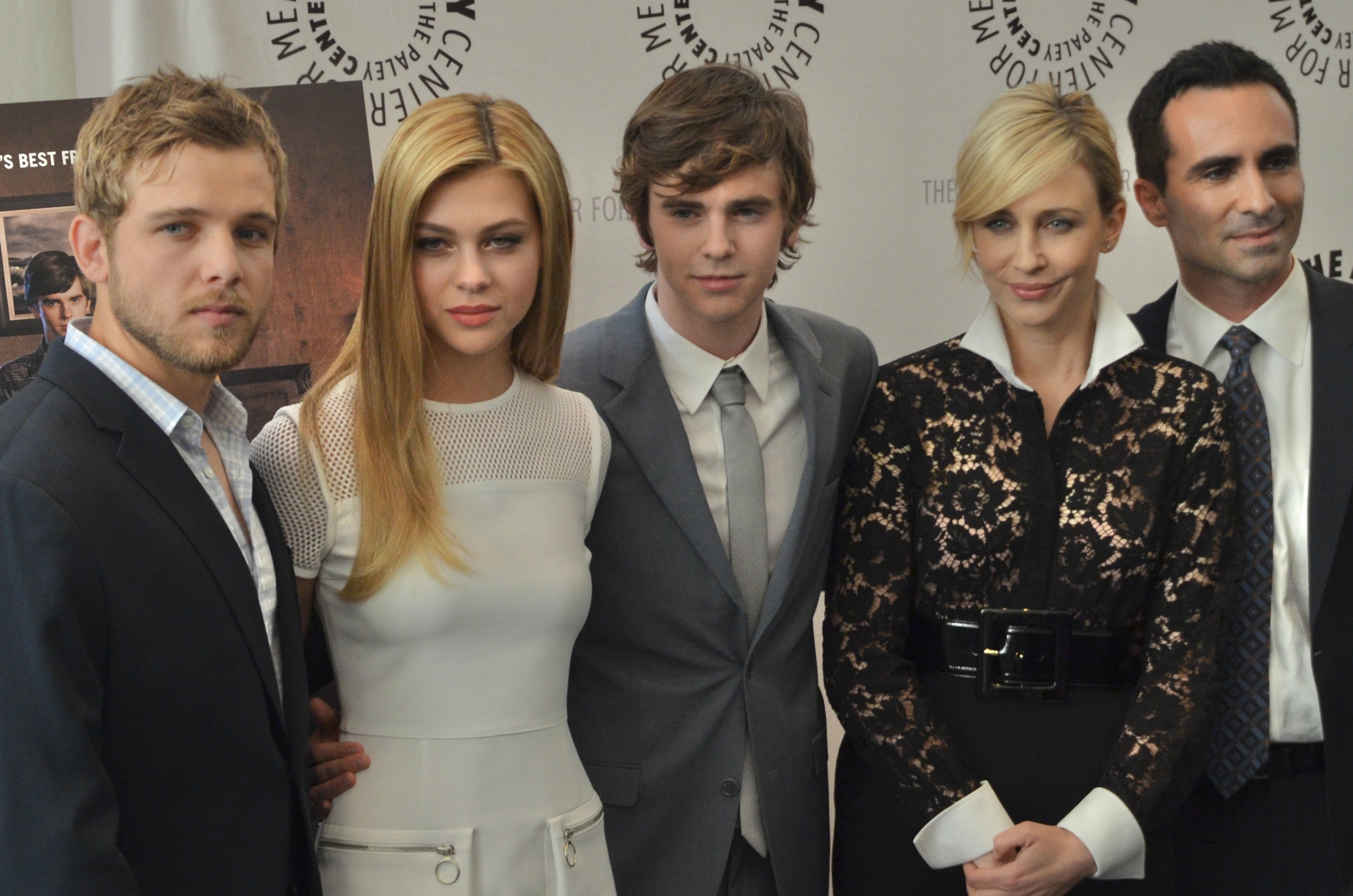
The cast promoting the series at the Paley Center for Media in 2013 (left to right): Thieriot, Peltz, Highmore, Farmiga, and Carbonell.

On July 5, 1987, a made-for-television film written and directed by Richard Rothstein titled Bates Motel, a direct sequel to Psycho aired on NBC. Starring Bud Cort, Lori Petty and Moses Gunn respectively as mentally disturbed youth Alex West, teenage runaway Willie and local handyman Henry Watson running the titular motel after Norman Bates passes away, it was intended to be a pilot for a proposed TV series that would follow various people who would check into the motel. However, the series was not picked up by the network.

In 2012, A&E was developing a television series also titled Bates Motel that would serve as a "contemporary prequel" to the Alfred Hitchcock film Psycho. The first script was written by Anthony Cipriano. Carlton Cuse and Kerry Ehrin joined the project in March as executive producers and head writers. Cuse has cited the drama series Twin Peaks as a key inspiration for Bates Motel: "We pretty much ripped off Twin Peaks... If you wanted to get that confession, the answer is yes. I loved that show. They only did 30 episodes. Kerry [Ehrin] and I thought we'd do the 70 that are missing". A&E gave Bates Motel a straight-to-series order in July. Chris Bacon was hired to score the music for the series in January 2013.

=== Casting ===
The casting for the series started in August 2012. Vera Farmiga was the first to be cast in the leading role of Norma Louise Bates. Freddie Highmore was cast as Norman Bates in September. Before Highmore's casting, Timothée Chalamet auditioned for the role, though he confused it with American Psycho. The same month, Max Thieriot was cast as Norman's half-brother, Dylan Massett. Shortly after, Nicola Peltz was cast as Bradley Martin, a possible love interest for Norman. Olivia Cooke was the final main cast member to join the series, in the role of Emma Decody, Norman's best friend. Nestor Carbonell was cast in a recurring role as Sheriff Alex Romero in the first season, but was upgraded to the main cast at the beginning of the second season. Kenny Johnson, who recurred as Norma's brother Caleb Calhoun in the second season, was promoted to a series regular for the third season. Rihanna later appeared in the iconic role of Marion Crane for the fifth and final season.

=== Filming ===
A replica of the original Bates Motel set from the film Psycho was built on location at approximately 1054 272 Street in Aldergrove, British Columbia, where portions of the series were filmed. The original house and motel are located in Universal Studios, Hollywood, Los Angeles. Additional filming for the series took place in multiple areas in Metro Vancouver, including Steveston, Coquitlam, Horseshoe Bay, West Vancouver and Fort Langley. In February 2017, after filming was completed for the series, the Bates Motel exterior set in Aldergrove was demolished.

== Reception ==
=== Critical response ===
The first season received positive reviews from critics. On Metacritic, the season holds a score of 66 out of 100, based on 34 critics. On the review aggregator Rotten Tomatoes, the season has an 84% rating with an average score of 7.11/10, based on 43 reviews. The site's critical consensus reads, "Bates Motel utilizes mind manipulation and suspenseful fear tactics, on top of consistently sharp character work and wonderfully uncomfortable familial relationships".

The second season also received positive reviews from critics. On Metacritic the season had a score of 67 out of 100, based on 11 critics. On Rotten Tomatoes, the season has a 90% rating with an average score of 8.02/10, based on 21 reviews. The site's consensus reads, "Bates Motel reinvents a classic thriller with believable performances and distinguished writing".

The third season of Bates Motel received a score of 72 out of 100 on Metacritic. Rotten Tomatoes reported a 95% rating from 21 reviews. The site's consensus reads, "Bates Motel further blurs lines around TV's creepiest taboo mother/son relationship, uncomfortably darkening its already fascinating tone".

The fourth season of Bates Motel was met with critical acclaim. Rotten Tomatoes reported a 100% positive rating from 17 reviews. The site's consensus reads, "Bates Motel fulfills its menacing potential in a fourth season that confidently careens toward the mother-son duo's ghastly destiny". Alan Sepinwall of Uproxx considered Bates Motel to have only become a good series midway through season four due to obtaining a better narrative purpose and "tragic grandeur" with the season's latter episodes.

The fifth and final season of Bates Motel received a score of 81 out of 100 on Metacritic. Rotten Tomatoes reported a 100% rating from 21 reviews. The site's consensus reads, "Bates Motel's final season brings the franchise full circle, with a satisfyingly creepy conclusion to the trials and tribulations of Norman Bates".

=== Ratings ===
Season	Time slot (ET)	Eps	Premiered		Ended		Average viewers (in millions)
Season	Time slot (ET)	Eps	Date	Premiere viewers (in millions)	Date	Finale viewers (in millions)	Average viewers (in millions)
1	Monday 10 p.m.	10	March 18, 2013	3.04	May 20, 2013	2.70	2.70
2	Monday 10 p.m.	10	March 3, 2014	3.07	May 5, 2014	2.30	2.30
3	Monday 9 p.m.	10	March 9, 2015	2.14	May 11, 2015	1.67	1.80
4	Monday 9 p.m.	10	March 7, 2016	1.55	May 16, 2016	1.50	1.45
5	Monday 10 p.m.	10	February 20, 2017	1.34	April 24, 2017	1.41	1.29

== Home media ==
DVD & Blu-ray
Season	Release date			Special features
Season	Region 1/A	Region 2/B	Region 4/B	Special features
Season 1	September 17, 2013	February 3, 2014	November 27, 2014	Deleted Scenes; Paley Center Panel Discussion with the Cast and Creative Team
Season 2	October 7, 2014	October 13, 2014	December 3, 2015	Deleted Scenes; Bates Motel: After Hours – Season 2 Premiere; Bates Motel: After Hours – Season 2 Finale; Origins of a Psycho: Inside Bates Motel
Season 3	October 13, 2015	October 12, 2015	December 7, 2016	Deleted Scenes; A Broken Psyche: Creating Norma-n
Season 4	October 18, 2016	October 10, 2016	August 2, 2017	Deleted Scenes
Season 5	September 19, 2017	October 16, 2017	December 6, 2017	Gag Reel; Bates Motel: Closed for Business; Bates Motel: The Checkout
The Complete Series	September 19, 2017	October 16, 2017	December 6, 2017	Paley Center Panel Discussion with the Cast and Creative Team; Bates Motel: After Hours – Season 2 Premiere; Bates Motel: After Hours – Season 2 Finale; Origins of a Psycho: Inside Bates Motel; Deleted Scenes; A Broken Psyche: Creating Norma-n; Gag Reel; Bates Motel: Closed for Business; Bates Motel: The Checkout

== International broadcast ==
In Canada, the series airs only on the U.S. network A&E, which is available through most Canadian cable and satellite companies. In Australia, the series premiered on Fox8 on May 26, 2013. In the UK and Ireland, it premiered on Universal Channel on September 12, 2013 and then on BBC One on February 23, 2021. In Jamaica, it premiered on CVM TV on August 11, 2014. In the Middle East, it premiered on OSN First HD in mid-2014. The second season premiered on January 5, 2015. In the Philippines, Bates Motel began airing on Jack TV on August 12, 2013. In South Africa, the series premiered on MNet on June 21, 2013. The series premiered in India on Colors Infinity on November 6, 2015. As of May 2019 Netflix has licensed worldwide distribution for at least 30 countries.

== Merchandising ==
NBCUniversal partnered with Hot Topic, the American retailer of pop culture merchandise, to introduce a collection of clothing and accessories inspired by Bates Motel. The merchandise, including items such as bathrobes and bloody shower curtains, became available at Hot Topic's website and select stores on March 18, 2014. As of 2018, the merchandise is no longer available through Hot Topic.
