= Scott Kosar =

American screenwriter

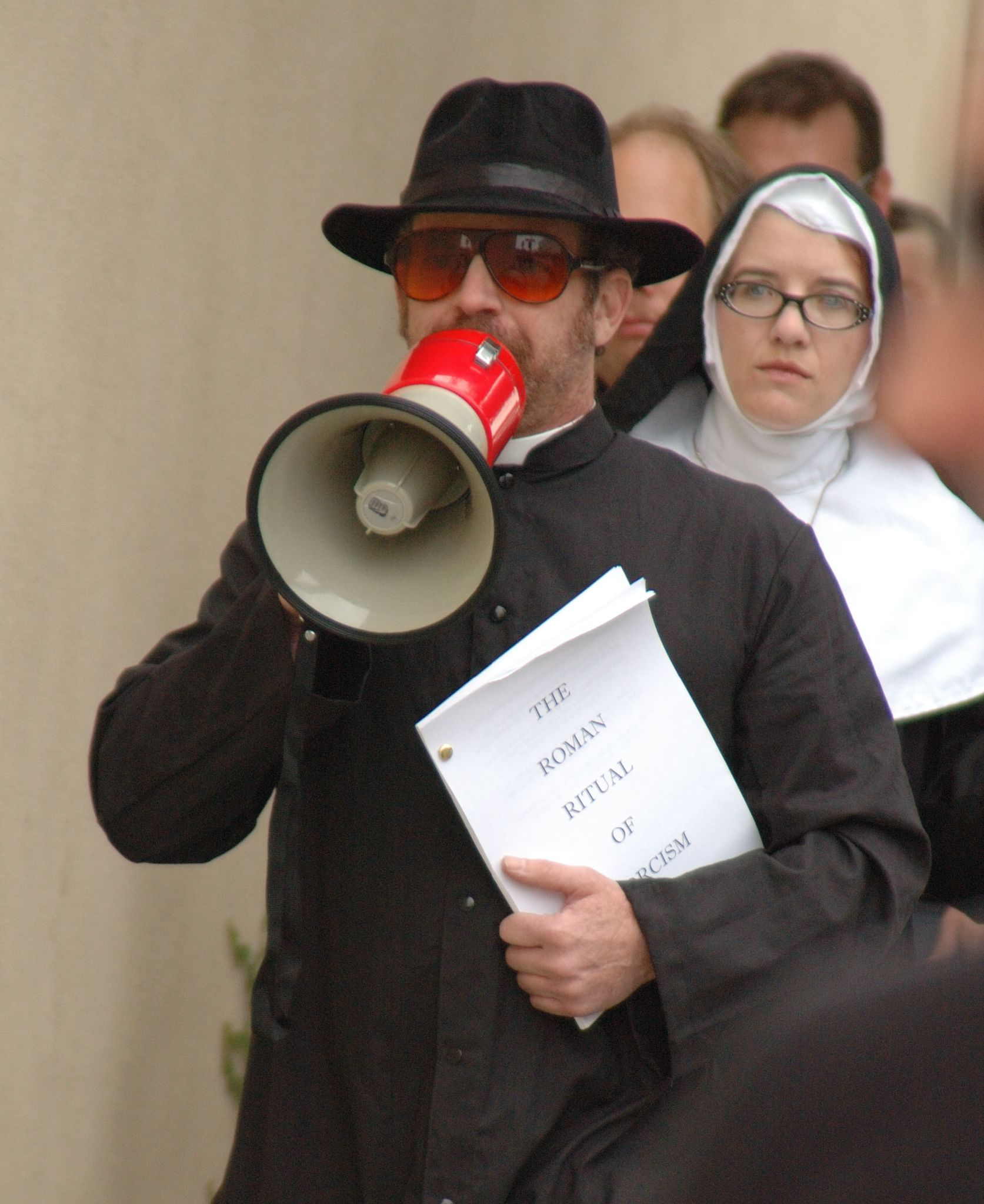
- Kosar during the 2007 Writers Guild of America strike
- Occupation: Screenwriter
- Period: 2003–present
- Genre: Horror

Scott Kosar is an American screenwriter whose films include The Machinist, the 2003 remake of the classic horror film The Texas Chain Saw Massacre, and the 2005 remake of The Amityville Horror. In June 2006, he was presented with the Distinguished Achievement in Screenwriting Award by the UCLA School of Theater, Film and Television. Kosar was appointed the Hunter/Zakin screenwriting chair at UCLA for 2009–2010.

== Career ==
Kosar wrote the script for The Machinist while attending the graduate screenwriting program at the UCLA School of Theater, Film and Television. The movie became notorious for actor Christian Bale's dramatic weight loss (Bale dropped his weight to 120 pounds for the film) and was described by Stephen Holden of The New York Times as "one of the few movies to scale the barrier between chilly fantasy and authentic cinematic nightmare."

During the years that it took for The Machinist to be produced, the script attracted the attention of producer-director Michael Bay, who hired Kosar to write The Texas Chain Saw Massacre remake. It was directed by Marcus Nispel. The Texas Chainsaw Massacre was released in North America on October 17, 2003, in 3,018 theaters. It grossed $10,620,000 on its opening day and concluded its North America opening weekend with $28,094,014, ranking No. 1 at the box office. The film opened in various other countries and grossed $26,500,000, while the North American gross stands at $80,571,655, bringing the worldwide gross to $107,071,655. The film's budget was $9.5 million, making it the highest-grossing film of the franchise even when adjusted for inflation.

The box office success of that remake led Kosar to another collaboration with Bay's company with the remake of The Amityville Horror, directed by Andrew Douglas. The film grossed $65,233,369 domestically and $42,813,762 in foreign markets for a total worldwide box office of $108,047,131. Ruthe Stein of the San Francisco Chronicle thought "the truly shocking thing about the new version is that it's not bloody awful... The decision to use minimal computer-generated effects, made for monetary rather than artistic reasons, works to Amityville's advantage. It retains the cheesy look of the 1979 original, pure schlock not gussied up to appear to be anything else."

In February 2010, he began re-writing a Dracula prequel entitled Vlad for Summit Entertainment. That same year, he wrote the remake of The Crazies, directed by Breck Eisner. He has written and served as a supervising producer on the television series Bates Motel, a prequel to Psycho, as well as on the Netflix horror series The Haunting of Hill House.
