= Humble Pie (Friday Night Lights) =

- Friday Night Lights episode
- Episode no.: Season 2 Episode 13
- Directed by: Jeffrey Reiner
- Written by: Carter Harris
- Cinematography by: Todd McMullen
- Editing by: Peter B. Ellis
- Original release date: January 25, 2008
- Running time: 43 minutes

Guest appearances
- Brad Leland as Buddy Garrity; Matt Czuchry as Chris Kennedy; Kevin Rankin as Herc; Benny Ciaramello as Santiago Herrera; Jana Kramer as Noelle Davenport

Episode chronology
← Previous "Who Do You Think You Are?"	Next → "Leave No One Behind"
- Friday Night Lights (season 2)

"Humble Pie" is the thirteenth episode of the second season of the American sports drama television series Friday Night Lights, inspired by the 1990 nonfiction book by H. G. Bissinger. It is the 35th overall episode of the series and was written by supervising producer Carter Harris, and directed by executive producer Jeffrey Reiner. It originally aired on NBC on January 25, 2008.

The series is set in the fictional town of Dillon, a small, close-knit community in rural West Texas. It follows a high school football team, the Dillon Panthers. It features a set of characters, primarily connected to Coach Eric Taylor, his wife Tami, and their daughter Julie. In the episode, Smash faces charges over the assault, impacting his role in the season. Meanwhile, Tim and Billy try to pay their debt, while Jason starts working at the dealership.

According to Nielsen Media Research, the episode was seen by an estimated 5.37 million household viewers and gained a 1.9/5 ratings share among adults aged 18–49. The episode received generally positive reviews from critics, although some criticized the resolution to Tim's and Smash's storylines.

== Plot ==
Jason (Scott Porter) is told that his car needs repairs, which cost $4,000, half of his savings. As he shares his frustrations with Buddy (Brad Leland), he is offered a job at the dealership. Tim (Taylor Kitsch) is confronted by his former roommate, who demands that he gets his money back. Smash (Gaius Charles) is arrested on charges of assault, due to his encounter at the theater.

As Tim and Billy (Derek Phillips) fail to find the money, Tim visits Lyla (Minka Kelly) at church for help. She reluctantly visits him at home, where he confesses his feelings for her. Lyla states that nothing will ever happen between them and leaves. Later, Lyla mentions this to Chris (Matt Czuchry), but promises that she feels nothing for Tim and that she wants to be with Chris. At night, Lyla once again visits the Riggins, giving them an envelope with $3,000 to pay back. She also tells Tim that she won't visit him anymore, wanting to be with Chris.

Tami (Connie Britton) has been assigned as the new coach of Dillon's volleyball team. When the team fails to show any progress, Tami convinces Tyra (Adrianne Palicki) in joining them. Tyra has been struggling in seeing Landry (Jesse Plemons), who is now hanging out with a classmate named Jean (Brea Grant). Inspired by Tami's advice in imagining punching Tim, Tyra leads her team to a victory. Meanwhile, Jason faces problems at his new job, as his co-workers feel intimidated by his presence, and he even has to help a man who often visits to just see a car. Motivated by Buddy, he finally manages to convince the man to buy the car, which marks his first successful sale.

Eric (Kyle Chandler) and Corrina (Liz Mikel) attend Smash's encounter with his lawyer. The lawyer states that the best way to avoid legal action is through an apology and plead guilty to a misdemeanor. Smash refuses to do it, but is forced when his mother mentions his future could be in jeopardy. Smash issues a statement, but the man later appears on TV, claiming that he doesn't believe in his apology and that he attacked him without motive. Immediately questioned by the press, Smash angrily tells his version of the events and even claims he would've punched him even harder. Later, Eric visits Smash, telling him that the board has decided to suspend Smash for three games, which mark the final games of the regular season.

== Production ==
=== Development ===
In January 2008, NBC announced that the thirteenth episode of the season would be titled "Humble Pie". The episode was written by supervising producer Carter Harris, and directed by executive producer Jeffrey Reiner. This was Harris' fifth writing credit, and Reiner's 13th directing credit.

== Reception ==
=== Viewers ===
In its original American broadcast, "Humble Pie" was seen by an estimated 5.37 million household viewers with a 1.9/5 in the 18–49 demographics. This means that 1.9 percent of all households with televisions watched the episode, while 5 percent of all of those watching television at the time of the broadcast watched it. This was a slight increase in viewership from the previous episode, which was watched by an estimated 5.33 million household viewers with a 1.9 in the 18–49 demographics.

=== Critical reviews ===
"Humble Pie" received generally positive reviews from critics. Eric Goldman of IGN gave the episode a "good" 7.8 out of 10 and wrote, "This messy season of Friday Night Lights continued with an installment that had some pretty big events continue in the lives of many of the main characters."

Scott Tobias of The A.V. Club gave the episode a "B–" grade and wrote, "Coming off possibly the worst episode of the season, Friday Night Lights had dug itself quite a hole heading into 'Humble Pie.' And for much of tonight's hour, the solution seemed to be to keep on digging. Subplots that I'd hoped would go away quietly, like Riggins and his brother running off with $3,000 in Ferret Guy's meth money and Smash slugging a white guy for hurling racial epithets at his sister, were front and center, and neither one ended with a clean resolution. Sometimes you just wish certain storylines would pack up and ship off suddenly to Guatemala, but they can't all be Carlotta, I suppose." Ken Tucker of Entertainment Weekly wrote, "This week, we got another excellent episode of Friday Night Lights, even if it was not exactly the one I'd press upon a newbie I want to recruit for the FNL-watching team. You had to be hardcore to relish all the troubles and woes that rendered this one of the more downbeat editions of the series. Me, I pretty much loved it."

Alan Sepinwall wrote, "I've had lots of problems with FNL season two, but none moreso than the way the show has completely lost track of the damn team. We've seen, what, six games in 13 episodes? And now there are only three more before the playoffs start? And we spend an entire episode with zero football action or practice, but with a subplot devoted to the girls' volleyball team?" Leah Friedman of TV Guide wrote, "First, I need to say that I loved this episode overall. Second, I need to give a big fat TV GUIDE Jeer to FNL, Chevrolet and NBC for pouring that commercial disguised as drama down our throats and then making us watch it again 3 minutes later in an effort to promote a truck. We often say that whatever this show needs to do to stay alive should be done, but I have to wonder about that when I see things like this."

Andrew Johnston of Slant Magazine wrote, "On the heels of the season's biggest turkey, Friday Night Lights makes a notable return to form with an episode that sees a number of storylines converging as the writers' plan for the rest of the season starts to come into focus." Rick Porter of Zap2it wrote, "One possible upside to Friday Night Lights ending its season in a couple weeks is this: At least we will be spared further silliness from the world of Tim Riggins."

Brett Love of TV Squad wrote, "All in all, a very good episode. The crappy Tahoe advertising was out of line, but that falls on the doorstep of NBC, not FNL. With just two more episodes to go, I like where the show is." Television Without Pity gave the episode a "B" grade.

Scott Porter submitted this episode for consideration for Outstanding Supporting Actor in a Drama Series, while Minka Kelly submitted it for Outstanding Supporting Actress in a Drama Series at the 60th Primetime Emmy Awards.
