= Jumping the Gun (Friday Night Lights) =

- Friday Night Lights episode
- Episode no.: Season 2 Episode 11
- Directed by: Dan Attias
- Written by: Patrick Massett; John Zinman
- Cinematography by: Todd McMullen
- Editing by: Stephen Michael
- Original release date: January 11, 2008
- Running time: 43 minutes

Guest appearances
- Jessalyn Gilsig as Shelley Hayes; Brad Leland as Buddy Garrity; Jana Kramer as Noelle Davenport; Brooke Langton as Jackie Miller; Glenn Morshower as Chad Clarke; Daniella Alonso as Carlotta Alonso

Episode chronology
← Previous "There Goes the Neighborhood"	Next → "Who Do You Think You Are?"
- Friday Night Lights (season 2)

"Jumping the Gun" is the eleventh episode of the second season of the American sports drama television series Friday Night Lights, inspired by the 1990 nonfiction book by H. G. Bissinger. It is the 33rd overall episode of the series and was written by consulting producers Patrick Massett and John Zinman, and directed by Dan Attias. It originally aired on NBC on January 11, 2008.

The series is set in the fictional town of Dillon, a small, close-knit community in rural West Texas. It follows a high school football team, the Dillon Panthers. It features a set of characters, primarily connected to Coach Eric Taylor, his wife Tami, and their daughter Julie. In the episode, Smash faces pressure from colleges who are looking for a verbal commitment. Meanwhile, Eric faces problems with both Tim and Shelley, while the Panthers prepare to face Laribee.

According to Nielsen Media Research, the episode was seen by an estimated 5.80 million household viewers and gained a 2.0 ratings share among adults aged 18–49. The episode received mixed reviews from critics, who praised the performances (particularly Kyle Chandler), but criticized the writing and rushed storylines.

== Plot ==
Smash (Gaius Charles) starts receiving National Letter of Intent offers from many colleges, and consults with Noelle (Jana Kramer) to consider the best possible options. Eric (Kyle Chandler) tells an awake Julie (Aimee Teegarden) that he is sorry for letting Tim (Taylor Kitsch) move in with them.

Shelley (Jessalyn Gilsig) is delighted when she officially gets her real estate licence, but the Taylors are not happy when she plans to use the house's phone line to make calls. When she accidentally tapes an episode of The Office over a game film Eric intended to study, Eric scolds her and asks her when she plans to leave. A devastated Shelley decides to leave the house, apologizing to Tami (Connie Britton) for her behavior. Eric also has to deal with Smash's ambitions, as he feels he is prioritizing his football career over his education, and asks him to consider what his mother believes is better for himself.

Tim goes back home, finding the place trashed. He finds Jackie (Brooke Langton), revealing that she broke up with Billy (Derek Phillips) as he lost his job, and she cannot deal with two mortgages. Tim meets up with Billy, who apologizes for getting involved with Jackie and failing him as his brother. Tim accepts this, and both reconcile. Julie also visits Tim, apologizing for everything that happened at her house, as she is frightened of angering her parents. Nevertheless, Julie confesses the events of the party to Eric, telling him that Tim was saving her. That night, Tim and Billy go to his roommate's house to get his stuff back. During this, Tim discovers $3,000 stashed, and decides to take it to pay the mortgage, despite Billy's concern that they are stealing from a drug dealer.

The game between Dillon and Laribee turns aggressive, culminating with Donald (Billy Thornton) gets into the field to tackle Tim. The game is suspended, with the Panthers receiving the win for Donald's behavior. When Eric angrily confronts Donald, he finds that Donald's wife only has three months to live, which has been consuming him. Tami reconciles with Shelley, who says she will move to Dallas for a new beginning. Smash decides to accept an offer from TMU, which is one of his dreams. Eric apologizes to Tim for misjudging him, as well as his harsh treatment for the past weeks. After Eric talks with Julie over her actions at the party, they join Tami in watching Foul Play at home.

== Production ==
=== Development ===
In December 2007, NBC announced that the eleventh episode of the season would be titled "Jumping the Gun". The episode was written by consulting producers Patrick Massett and John Zinman, and directed by Dan Attias. This was Massett's fifth writing credit, Zinman's fifth writing credit, and Attias' first directing credit.

== Reception ==
=== Viewers ===
In its original American broadcast, "Jumping the Gun" was seen by an estimated 5.80 million household viewers with a 2.0 in the 18–49 demographics. This means that 2.0 percent of all households with televisions watched the episode. It finished 61st out of 95 programs airing from January 7–13, 2008. This was a 4% increase in viewership from the previous episode, which was watched by an estimated 5.53 million household viewers with a 1.8 in the 18–49 demographics.

=== Critical reviews ===
"Jumping the Gun" received mixed reviews from critics. Eric Goldman of IGN gave the episode a "good" 7 out of 10 and wrote, "This was a hit and miss Friday Night Lights, combining strong moments that served as a reminder of the show's numerous strengths with some questionable plot points that had echoes of the Landry/murder plotline in the way they took the show into a place it just doesn't naturally fit."

Scott Tobias of The A.V. Club gave the episode a "B" grade and wrote, "Even ardent Friday Night Lights fans like myself can agree that the show has its peaks and occasional valleys, but if there's one reliable thing about the show, it's that you can never go wrong by keeping the focus on Kyle Chandler and Connie Britton. Now, there have been plenty of opportunities this season, particularly early on, to appreciate the wonders Britton offers up on a weekly basis. Tonight might have been a solid, boilerplate FNL episode overall, but it's the best chance we've had this season to see what Chandler can do." Ken Tucker of Entertainment Weekly wrote, "If Friday Night Lights was a big ol’ ratings hit, Kyle Chandler would be Fed-Ex'ing this week's episode to the Emmy committee for the showcase he had and the performance he gave with that opportunity."

Alan Sepinwall wrote, "They still do beautiful work much of the time, but they've proven themselves to be very fallible this year. As for the non-larcenous portion of 'Jumping the Gun,' it was the usual mixed bag we've gotten from FNL season two: some good ideas, some erratic execution and the usual stellar performances." Leah Friedman of TV Guide wrote, "let me be the first to pardon Coach Dickie of Laribee for his completely unprofessional on-field behavior. If my husband were given three months to live, I'd probably knock out Tim Riggins too. Then again, if one is getting paid a boatload of money to coach, one has probably learned to compartmentalize. The bright side is that the Laribee Lions are out of our hair."

Andrew Johnston of Slant Magazine wrote, "Perhaps in part because 'Jumping the Gun' is one of the few episodes this season that I've had the opportunity to see twice before writing about it, this weeks's installment of Friday Night Lights seemed particularly meaty. Although lots of characters turn up incidentally, the script keeps a tight focus on three of the series's central figures and the exclusion of Matt, Landry, Jason, Tyra, etc., allows for a somewhat deeper exploration of the issues du jour." Rick Porter of Zap2it wrote, "The first 50 minutes or so of this week's Friday Night Lights? Pretty strong, with only a quibble or two about Smash's recruiting. The last 10 minutes, though? Oy."

Brett Love of TV Squad wrote, "This was my favorite episode of season two so far. That does, of course, have more than a little to do with the fact that the murder was completely off the radar. With just four episodes to go, I think the show has found its stride." Television Without Pity gave the episode a "D+" grade.
