= Anthony Cipriano =

American film producer

- Born: August 1, 1975 (age 50); Providence, Rhode Island, U.S.
- Occupations: Writer; film producer

Anthony S. Cipriano (born August 1, 1975), an American-born writer and producer, currently based in Los Angeles. Best known for creating the A&E drama-thriller series Bates Motel. Cipriano is also an Independent Spirit John Cassavetes Award nominee for his film 12 and Holding, directed by Michael Cuesta and starring Jeremy Renner.

Although he was born in Providence, Rhode Island, Cipriano spent most of his childhood in North Attleborough, Massachusetts. In 1997, he received a bachelor's degree from Westfield State University where he studied mass communications.

Cipriano began his career in Los Angeles in the late 1990s as a director's assistant on The Rosie O'Donnell Show. He quickly transitioned to scripted television, landing a job as a writer on Nickelodeon's sci-fi comedy series The Journey of Allen Strange. Cipriano then went on to serve as a development executive for The Tom Lynch Company and penned episodes for Sk8 on TNBC, 100 Deeds for Eddie McDowd on Nickelodeon, and The Jersey on Disney Channel.

In 2005, Cipriano developed and wrote 12 and Holding, a coming of age drama film, directed by Michael Cuesta and starring Jeremy Renner. The film was distributed by IFC Films and released on May 19, 2005 in limited theaters.

His recent work includes the creation of the acclaimed series Bates Motel, for A&E. The series, a prequel to Alfred Hitchcock's 1960 film Psycho (based on Robert Bloch's novel of the same name), depicts the lives of Norman Bates (Freddie Highmore) and his mother Norma (Vera Farmiga) prior to the events portrayed in the film, albeit in a different fictional town (White Pine Bay, Oregon, as opposed to the film's Fairvale, California) and in a modern setting.
