= Kerry Ehrin =

Television screenwriter, showrunner, and producer (born 1960)

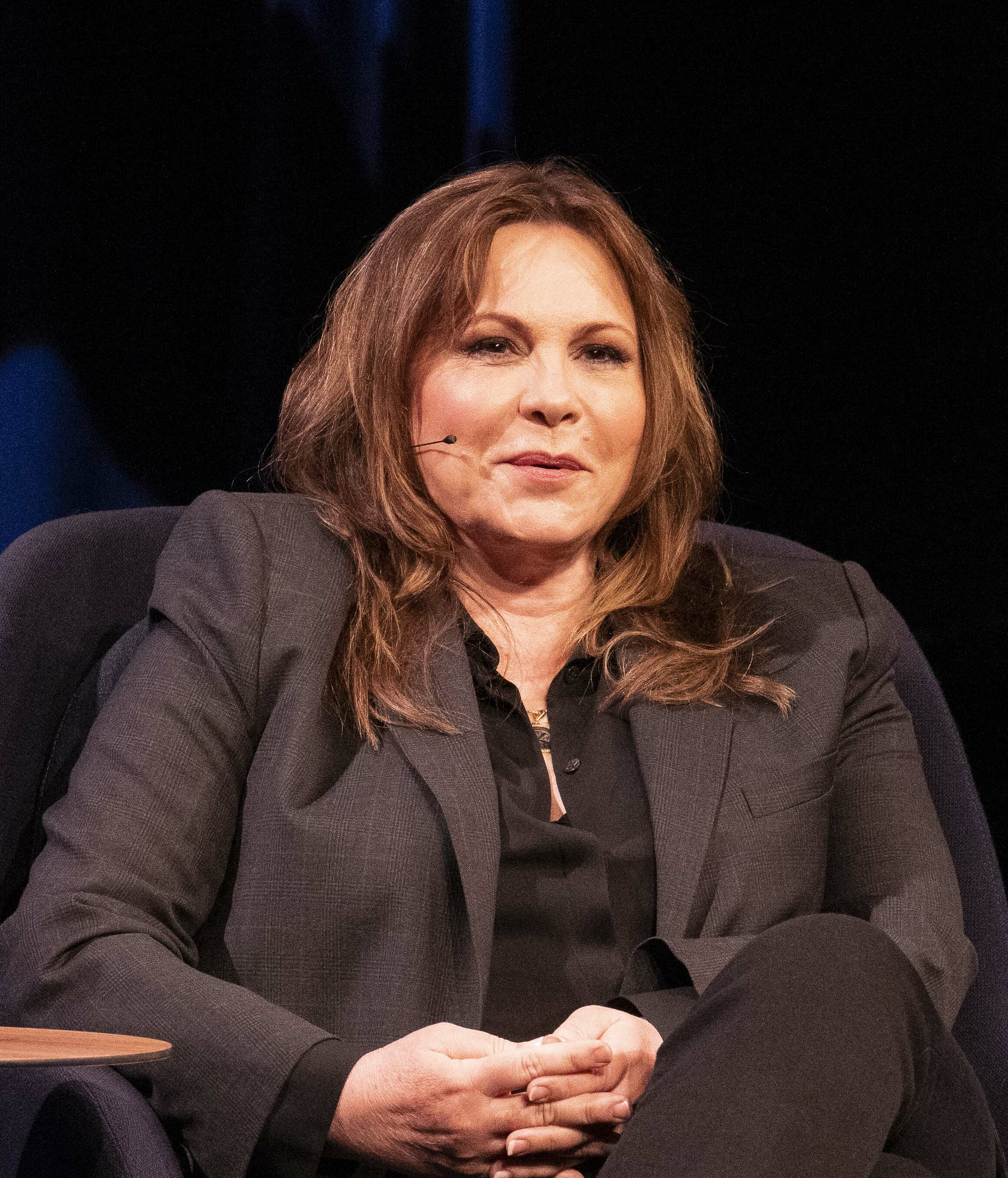
- Ehrin in May 2023
- Born: Kerry Anne Ehrin; October 8, 1960 (age 65); Los Angeles, California, U.S.
- Education: University of California, Los Angeles
- Occupations: Screenwriter; producer
- Years active: 1984–present
- Children: 3

Kerry Anne Ehrin (born October 8, 1960) is an American screenwriter, showrunner, and producer. The first writer with whom Apple TV+ signed an overall deal, Kerry Ehrin developed and ran the first two seasons of the Apple TV+ series The Morning Show starring Jennifer Aniston and Reese Witherspoon, which led the streaming service's launch. Ehrin was also the co-creator, executive producer, and co-showrunner of the Emmy-nominated and critically acclaimed A&E drama series Bates Motel which featured Vera Farmiga and Freddie Highmore in the iconic roles of Norma and Norman Bates, and aired for five seasons on A&E. Prior to that, she was a writer and producer on Friday Night Lights and Parenthood and has received numerous Emmy and WGA nominations, as well as four AFI Awards.

== Personal life ==
Ehrin was born in Los Angeles, California, and grew up in the Woodland Hills neighborhood with her sister, Mary. She was educated at Agoura High School, from which she graduated in 1978. Ehrin studied literature, specializing in playwriting, at the University of California, Los Angeles, and wrote her thesis on the work of Lewis Carroll.

She resides in Hidden Hills, California, with her three children, daughter Shane and twin sons Alex and Nicky. The children's father is Mr. Wrong co-writer, Craig Munson.

== Career ==
=== Beginnings (1989–2005) ===
In 1989, Ehrin began her career as a writer and co-producer on the ABC comedy-drama mystery series Moonlighting and the ABC comedy-drama series The Wonder Years. For the latter, she was nominated for the Primetime Emmy Award for Outstanding Comedy Series in 1990. She next served as a consulting producer and writer on the Fox drama series Boston Public from 2003 to 2004, and on the ABC legal drama series Boston Legal from 2004 to 2005.

Ehrin also co-wrote the screenplays of the 1996 comedy film Mr. Wrong and the 1999 action adventure film Inspector Gadget.

=== Friday Night Lights (2006–2011) ===
Ehrin was nominated for the Writers Guild of America Award for Television: New Series at the 2007 ceremony, for her work as a consulting producer and writer on the first season of Friday Night Lights. She was subsequently nominated for the Writers Guild of America Award for Television: Dramatic Series for three consecutive years: at the 2008 ceremony, the 2009 ceremony, and at the 2010 ceremony. She was also nominated for the Primetime Emmy Award for Outstanding Drama Series in 2011.

=== Parenthood (2011–2012) ===
From 2011 to 2012, Ehrin served as a co-executive producer and writer on the NBC drama series Parenthood.

=== Bates Motel (2013–2017) ===
Ehrin, alongside Carlton Cuse and Anthony Cipriano, developed the Psycho contemporary prequel series Bates Motel for the American cable network A&E. The series began airing in March 2013 and concluded its run in April 2017. Ehrin served as showrunner, lead writer, and an executive producer for the series. In 2014, she was nominated for Best Drama Series Produced by a Woman at the Women's Image Network Awards for her work on the series.

=== The Morning Show (2019-2022) ===
In November 2017, Apple ordered two seasons of the comedy-drama series The Morning Show, which stars Jennifer Aniston and Reese Witherspoon. Ehrin served as showrunner and executive producer alongside Aniston, Witherspoon, Michael Ellenberg, Mimi Leder, Lauren Levy Neustadter and Kristin Hahn. Ehrin also signed a multi-year deal with Apple to produce original content.

After she left the series, she signed an overall deal with Sony Pictures Television.

== Filmography ==
Year	Title	Functioned as			Writing credits
Year	Title	Writer	Producer	Showrunner	Writing credits
1984	Fame	Yes			Episode: "Appearances"
1985	M.A.S.K.	Yes			
1985	The Jetsons	Yes			Episode: "Little Bundle of Trouble"
1985	Growing Pains	Yes			Episode: "Dirt Bike"
1987	Newhart	Yes			Episode: "It's My Party and I'll Die If I Want To"
1985–1989	Moonlighting	Yes			13 episodes
1989–1990	The Wonder Years	Yes	Co-producer		Episode: "She, My Friend and I"
1996	Mr. Wrong	Yes			
1999	Inspector Gadget	Yes			
1999	Cold Feet	Yes	Executive producer	Yes	4 episodes
2000	Young Americans	Yes			Episode: "Kiss and Tell"
2003–2004	Boston Public	Yes	Consulting producer		6 episodes
2004–2005	Boston Legal	Yes	Consulting producer		Episode: "Still Crazy After All These Years"
2006–2011	Friday Night Lights	Yes	Consulting producer		12 episodes
2007	Bionic Woman	Yes			Episode: "Trust Issues"
2010–2012	Parenthood	Yes	Co-executive producer		7 episodes
2013–2017	Bates Motel	Yes	Executive producer	Yes	23 episodes
2018	Rise	Yes	Consulting producer		Episode: "What Flowers May Bloom"
2019-2022	The Morning Show	Yes	Yes	Yes	

== Awards and nominations ==
Year	Award	Work	Result	Ref.
1990	Primetime Emmy Award for Outstanding Comedy Series	The Wonder Years	Nominated	
2007	Writers Guild of America Award for Television: New Series	Friday Night Lights	Nominated	
2008	Writers Guild of America Award for Television: Dramatic Series	Friday Night Lights	Nominated	
2009	Writers Guild of America Award for Television: Dramatic Series	Friday Night Lights	Nominated	
2010	Writers Guild of America Award for Television: Dramatic Series	Friday Night Lights	Nominated	
2011	Writers Guild of America Award for Television: Dramatic Series	Friday Night Lights	Nominated	
2011	Primetime Emmy Award for Outstanding Drama Series	Friday Night Lights	Nominated	
2011	Online Film and Television Association Award for Best Writing in a Drama Series	Friday Night Lights	Nominated	
2012	Humanitas Prize for Best 60 Minute Network or Syndicated Television	Parenthood	Nominated	
2014	Women's Image Network Award for Best Drama Series Produced by a Woman	Bates Motel	Nominated	
2020	Golden Globe Award: Best Television Series, Drama	The Morning Show	Nominated	
2020	Television Critics' Association Awards: Outstanding New Program	The Morning Show	Nominated	
2022	Golden Globe Awards: Best Television Series, Drama	The Morning Show	Nominated	
2022	Hollywood Critics Association TV Awards: Best Streaming Series, Drama	The Morning Show	Nominated	
2022	Writers Guild of America Awards: Dramatic Series	The Morning Show	Nominated	
2022	Writers Guild of America Awards: Episodic Drama, Kerry Ehrin & Scott Troy (for "La Amara Vita")	The Morning Show	Nominated	
