= Primetime Emmy Award for Outstanding Lead Actress in a Limited or Anthology Series or Movie =

American television award

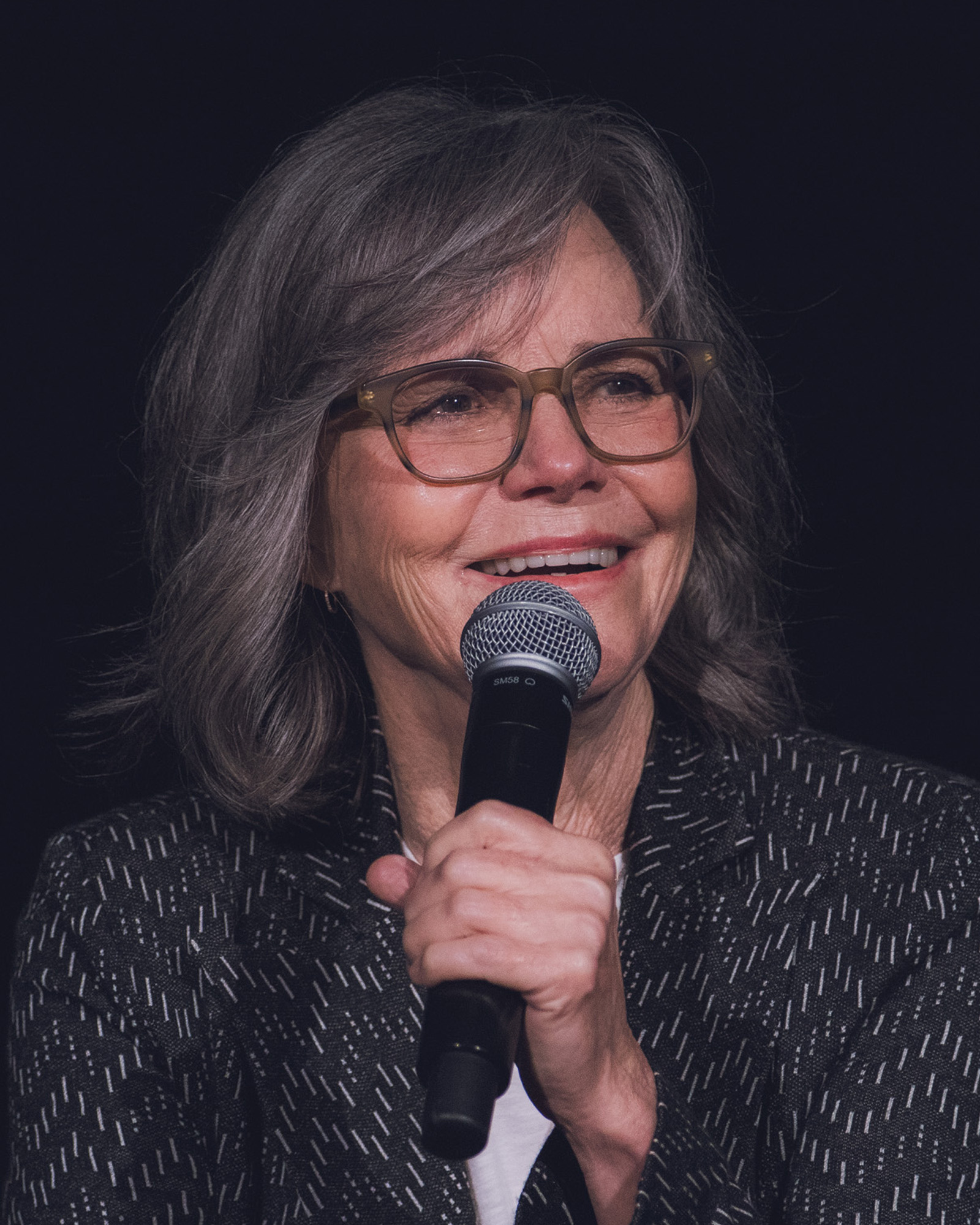
- The 2026 recipient: Sally Field
- Awarded for: Outstanding Lead Actress in a Limited or Anthology Series or Movie
- Country: United States
- Presented by: Academy of Television Arts & Sciences
- First award: 1955
- Currently held by: Sally Field, Remarkably Bright Creatures (2026)
- Website: emmys.com

The Primetime Emmy Award for Outstanding Lead Actress in a Limited or Anthology Series or Movie is an award presented annually by the Academy of Television Arts & Sciences (ATAS). It is given in honor of an actress who has delivered an outstanding performance in a leading role on a television limited series or television movie for the primetime network season.

The award was first presented at the 7th Primetime Emmy Awards on March 7, 1955, to Judith Anderson, for her performance as Lady Macbeth on the Hallmark Hall of Fame episode "Macbeth". It has undergone several name changes, with the category split into two categories at the 25th Primetime Emmy Awards: Outstanding Lead Actress in a Special Program – Drama or Comedy; and Outstanding Lead Actress in a Limited Series. By the 31st Primetime Emmy Awards, the categories were merged into one, and it has since undergone several name changes, leading to its current title.

Since its inception, the award has been given to 54 actresses. Sally Field is the current recipient of the award, for her portrayal of Tova Sullivan on Remarkably Bright Creatures. Helen Mirren has won the most awards in this category, with four.

== Winners and nominations ==
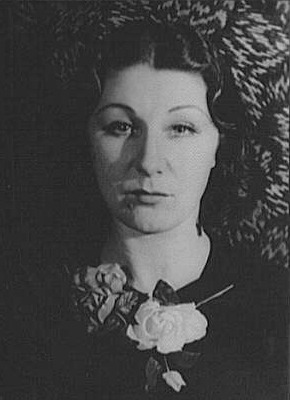
Judith Anderson won for: Hallmark Hall of Fame: Macbeth (1955).

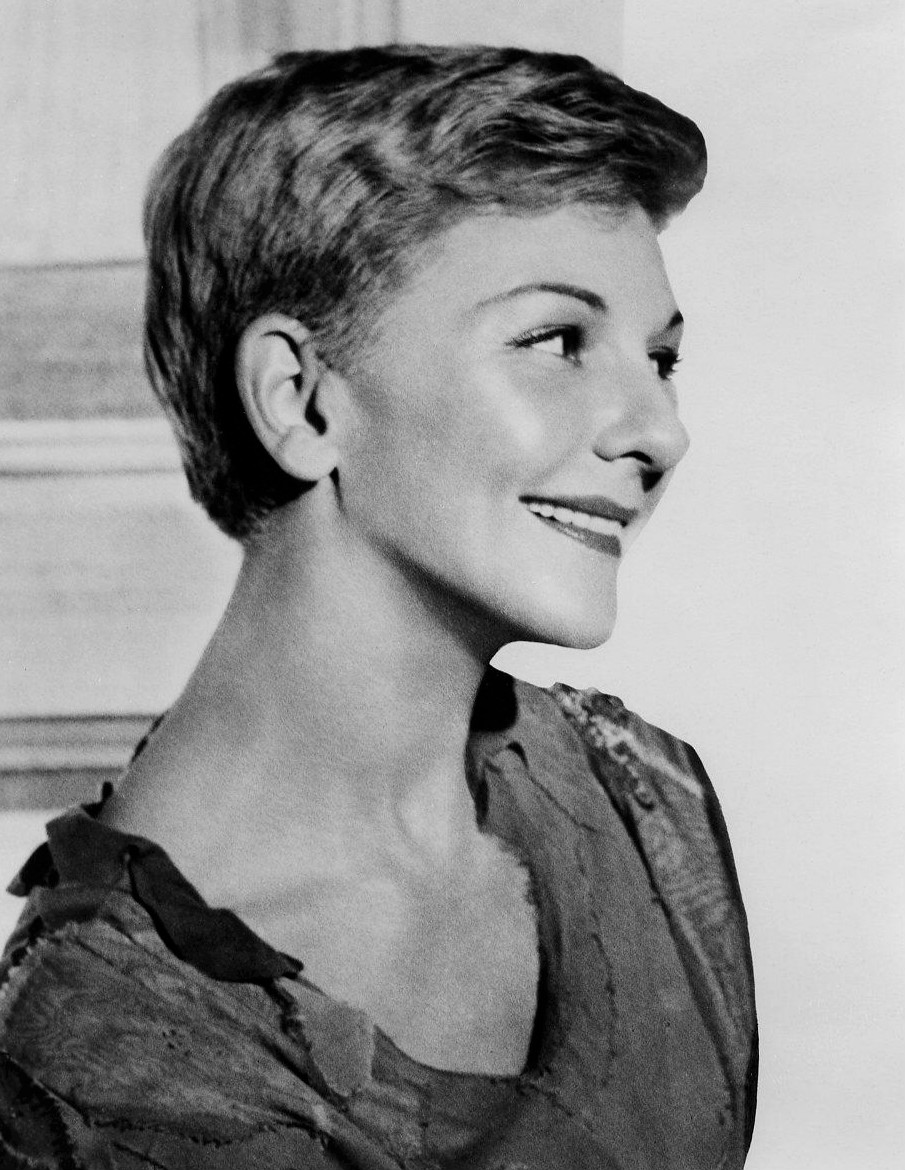
Mary Martin won playing Peter Pan in the Producers' Showcase (1956).

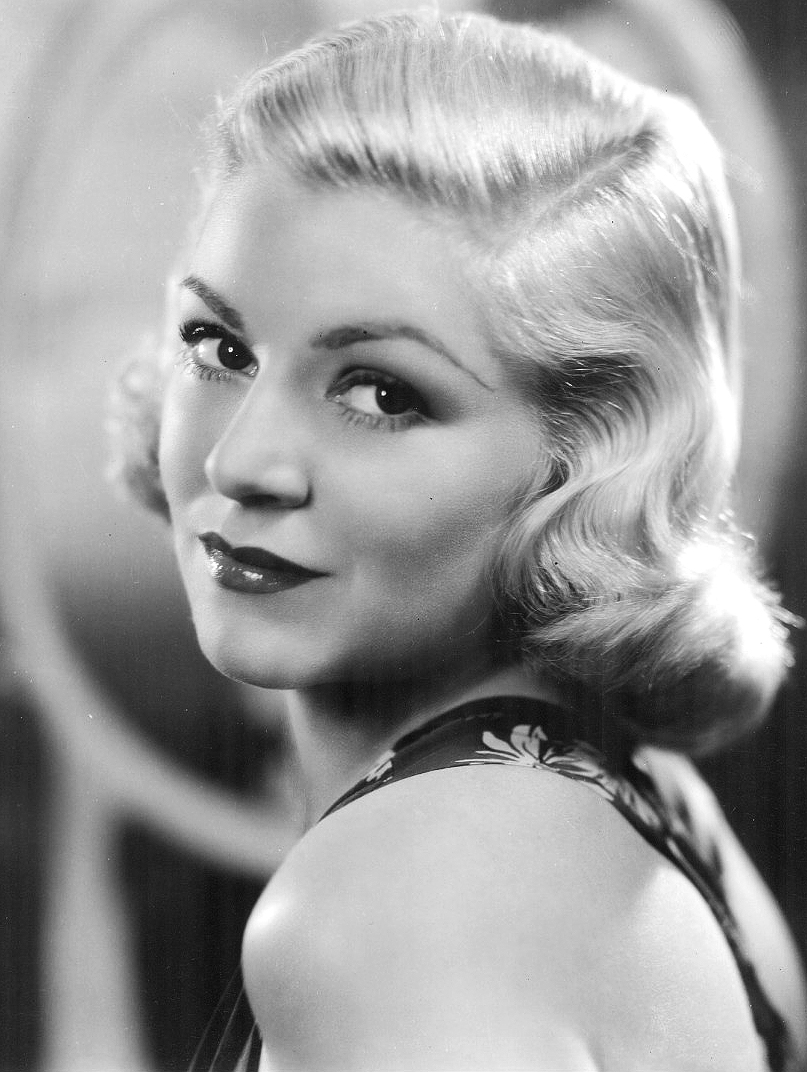
Claire Trevor won for Producers' Showcase (1957)

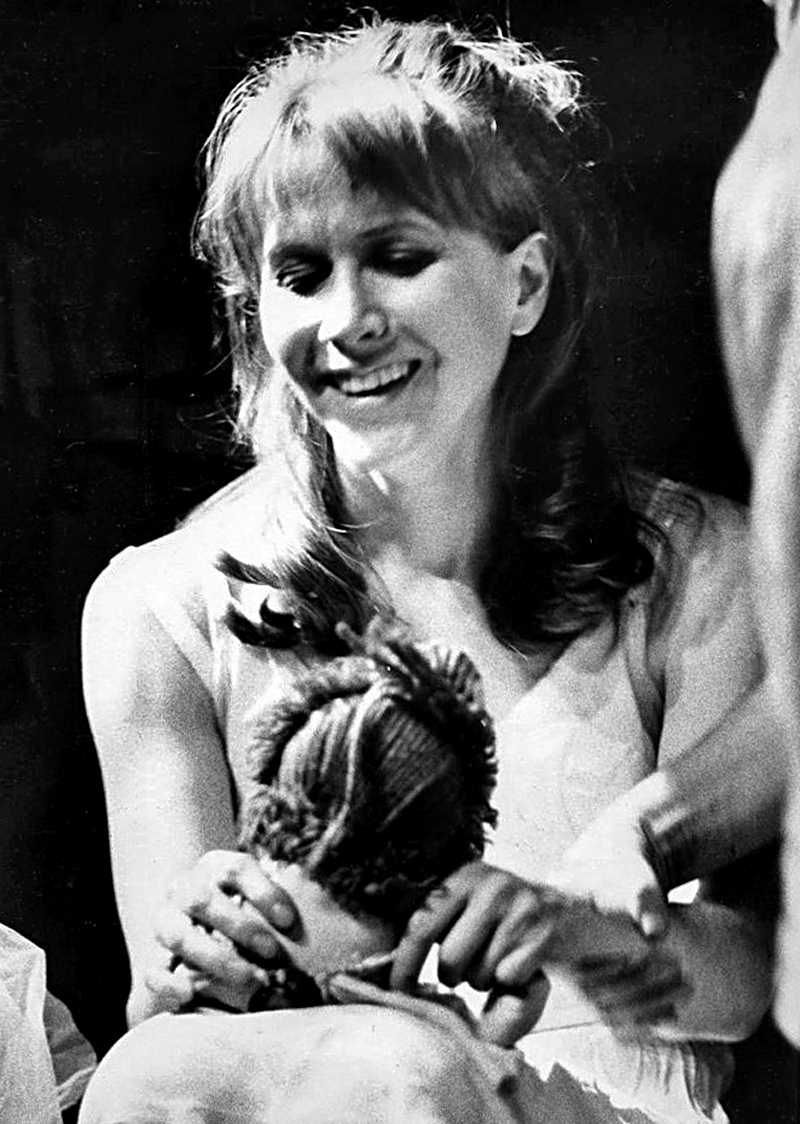
Julie Harris won twice for Hallmark Hall of Fame in 1959 and 1962.

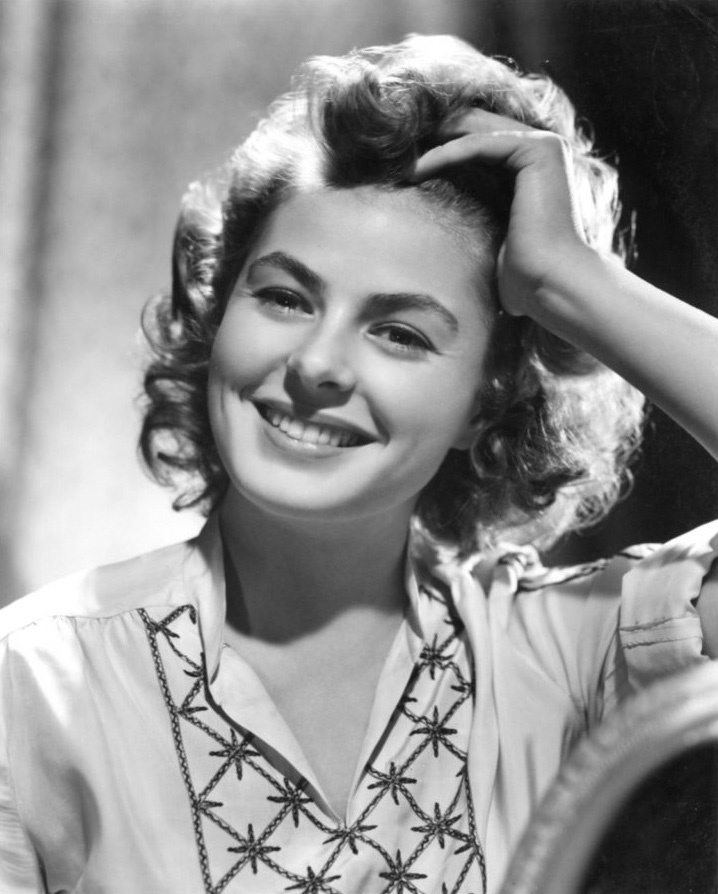
Ingrid Bergman won twice for Startime (1960) and A Woman Called Golda (1982).

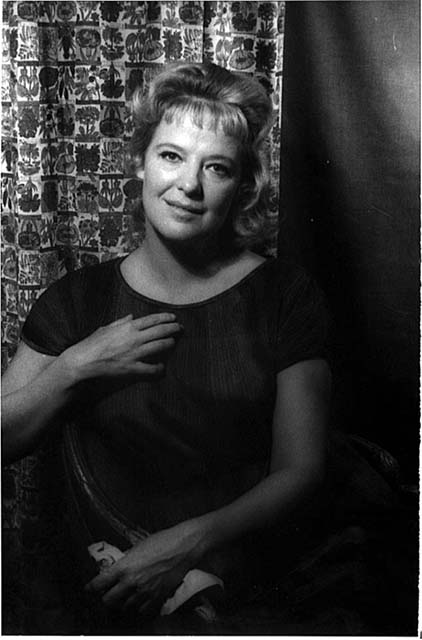
Kim Stanley won for Ben Casey (1963).

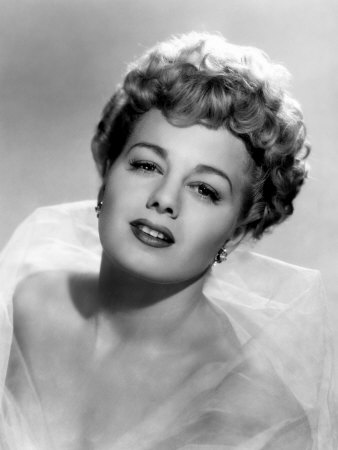
Shelley Winters won for Bob Hope Presents the Chrysler Theatre (1964).

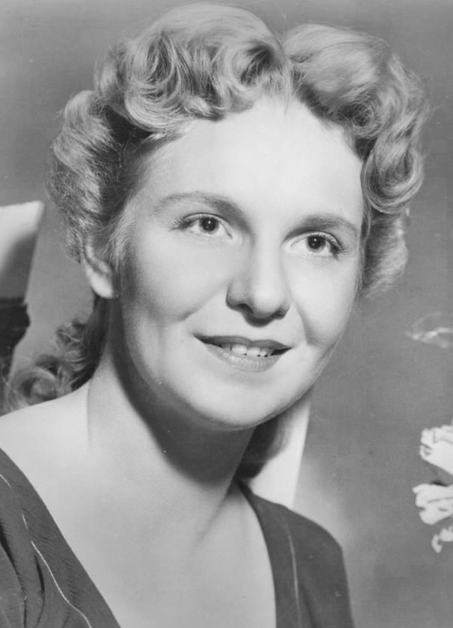
Geraldine Page won for ABC Stage 67 (1967) and The Thanksgiving Visitor (1969).

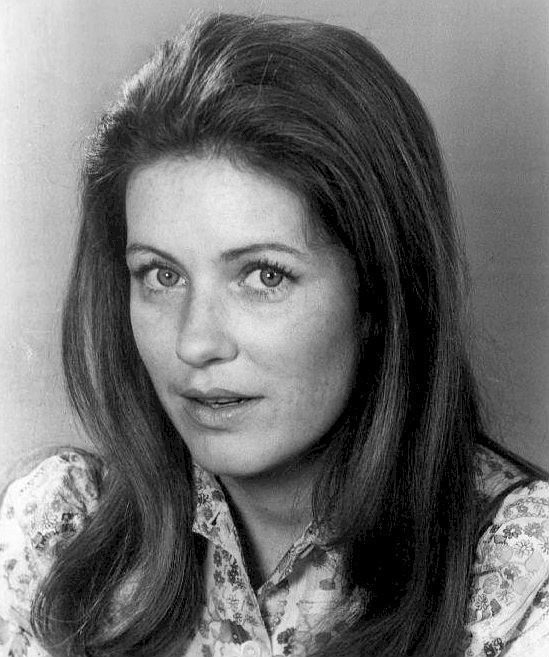
Patty Duke won thrice for her roles in My Sweet Charlie (1970), Captains and the Kings (1976), and The Miracle Worker (1979).

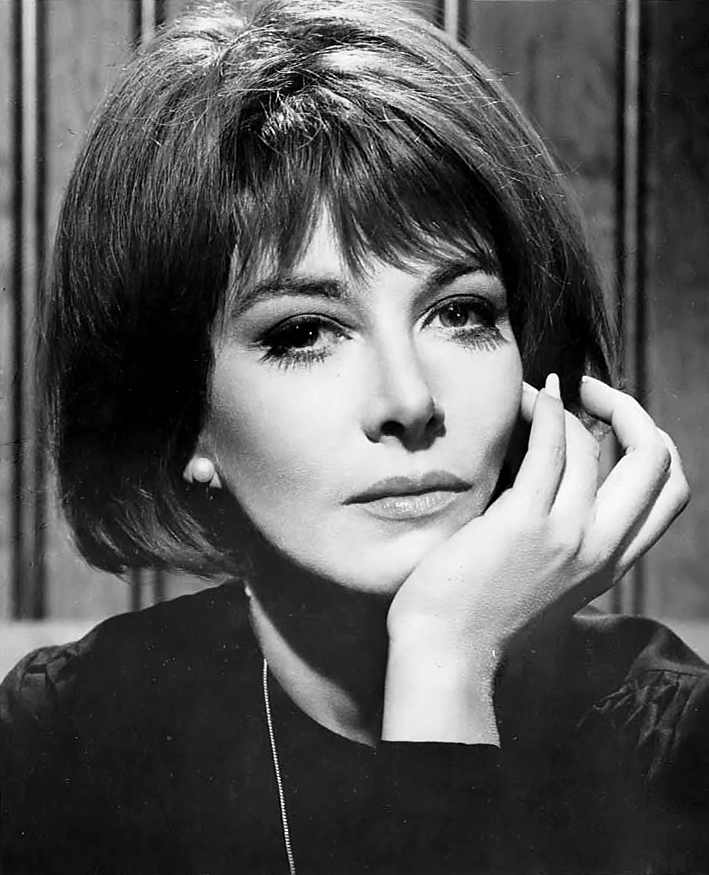
Lee Grant won for The Neon Ceiling (1971).

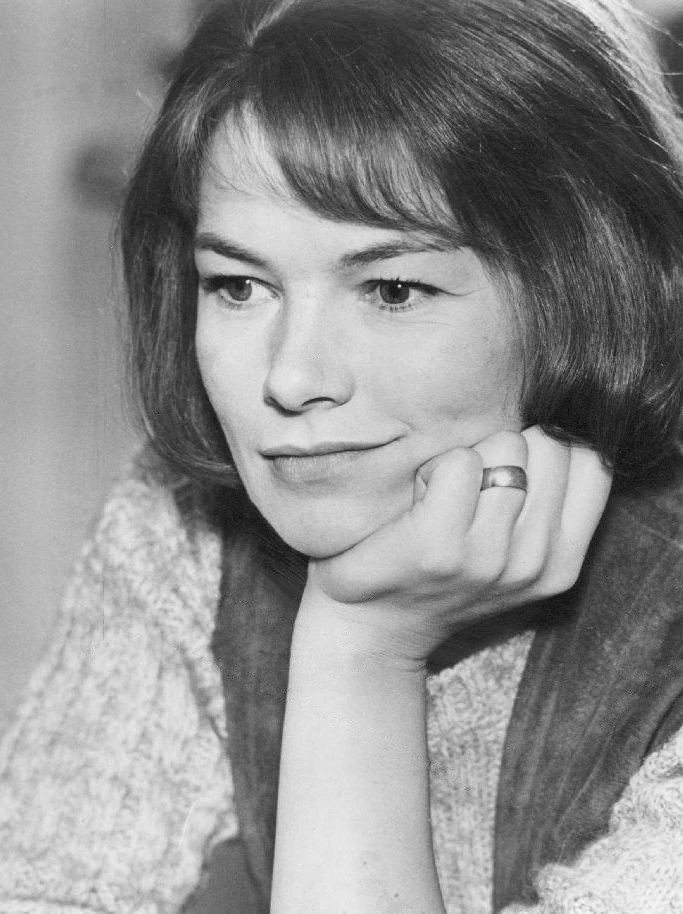
Glenda Jackson won for playing Queen Elizabeth I in Elizabeth R (1972).

Cloris Leachman won for A Brand New Life (1973).

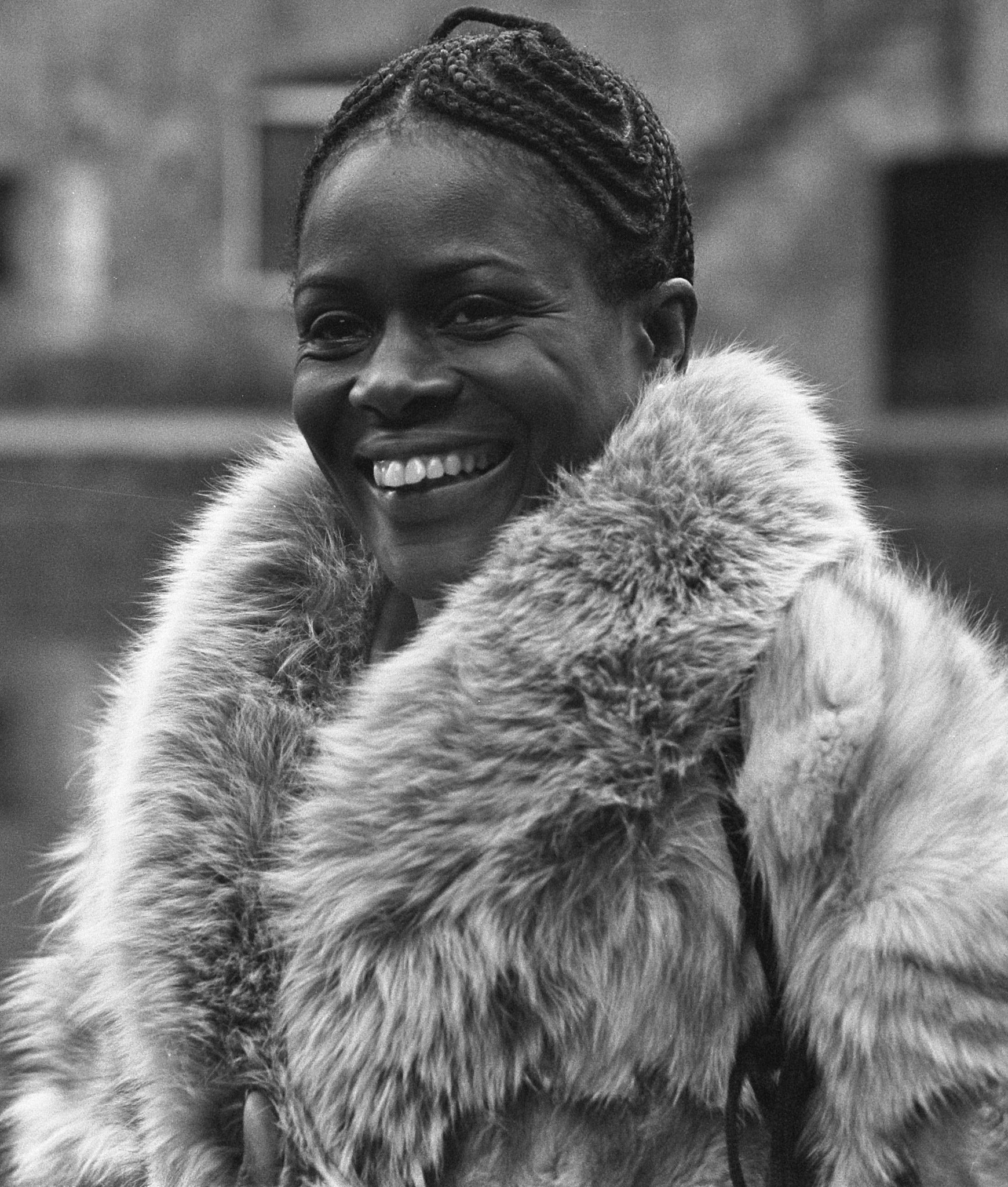
Cicely Tyson won playing Jane Pittman in The Autobiography of Miss Jane Pittman (1974).

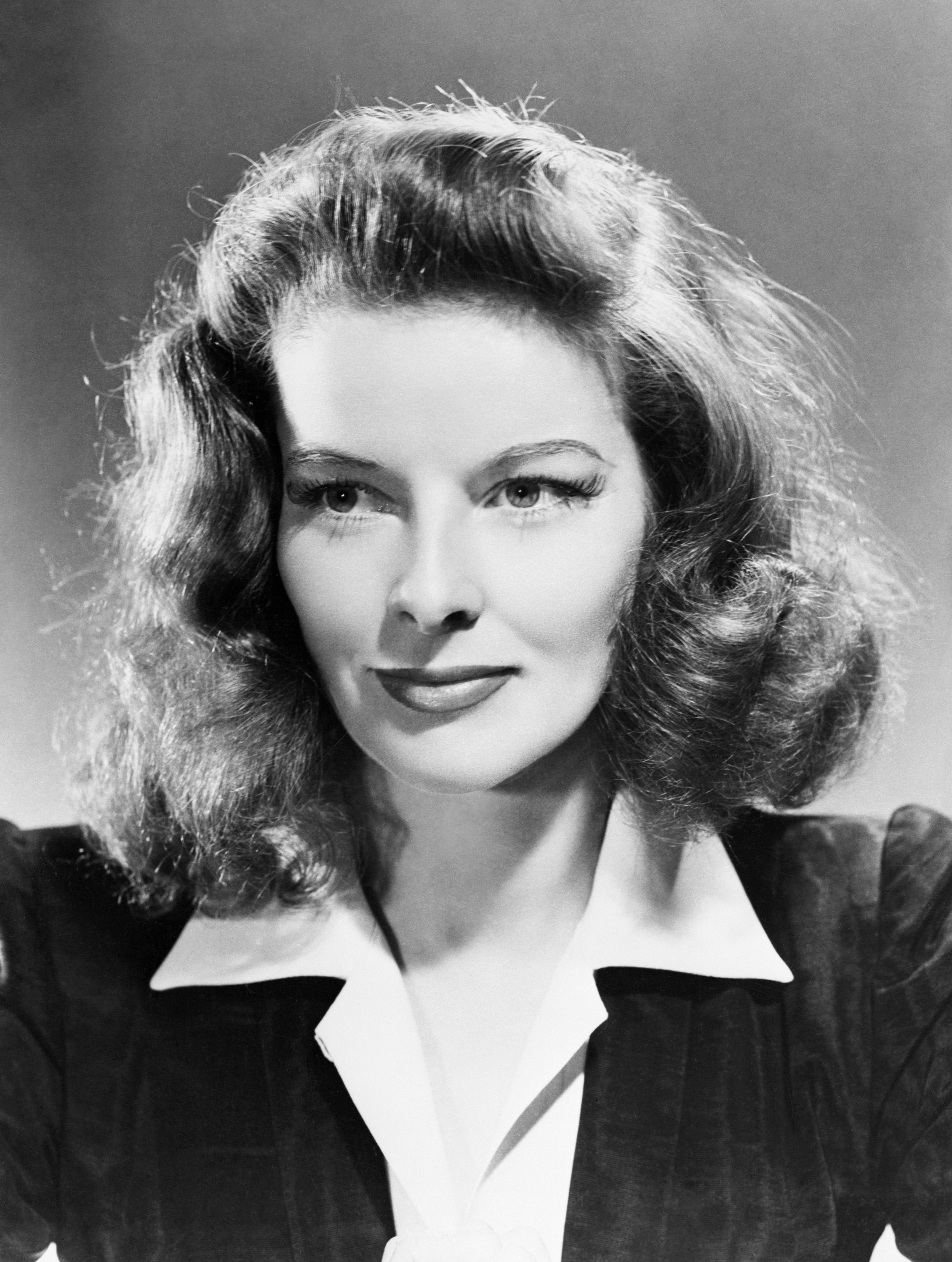
Katharine Hepburn won for Love Among the Ruins (1975).

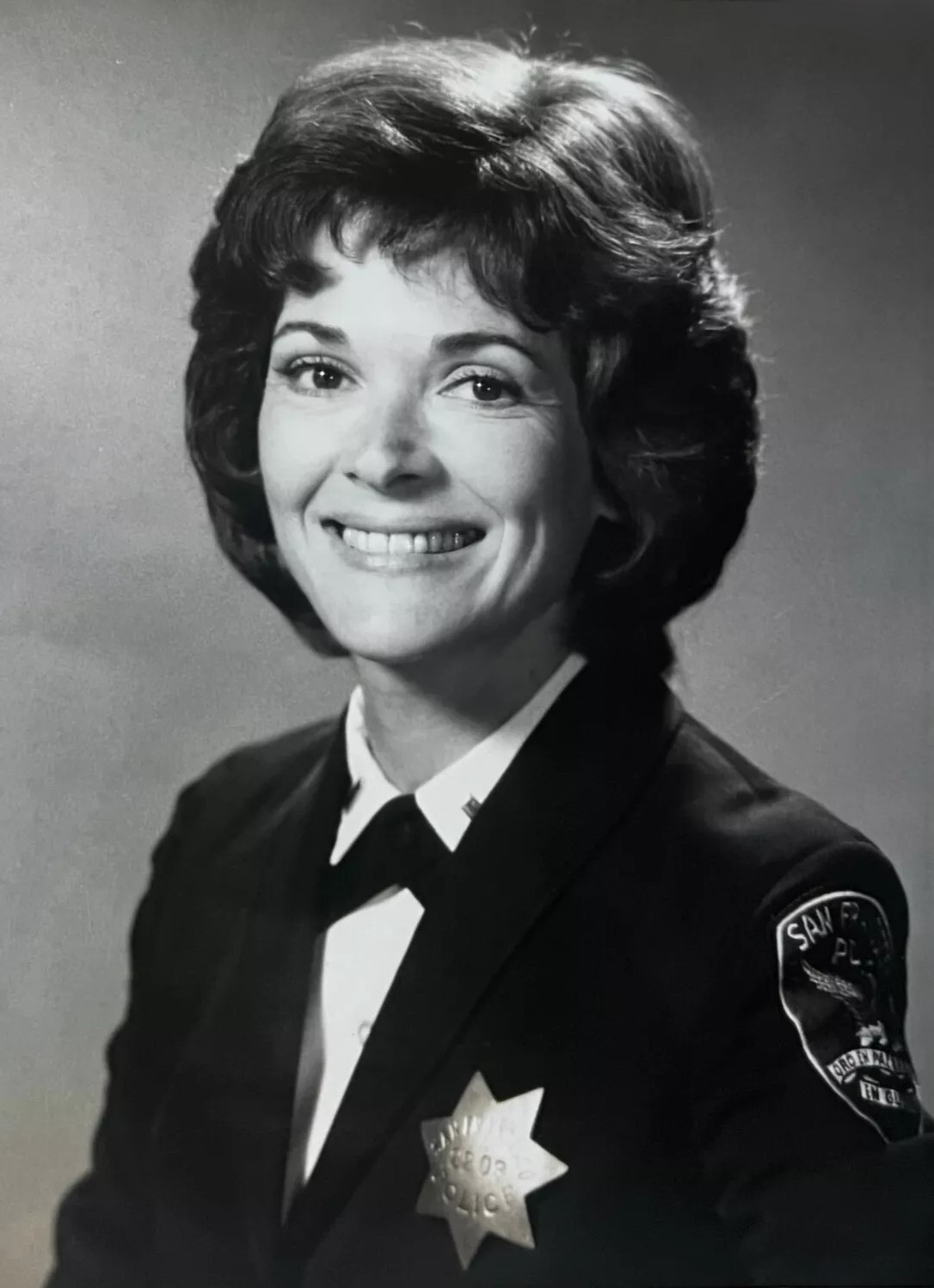
Jessica Walter won for Amy Prentiss (1975).

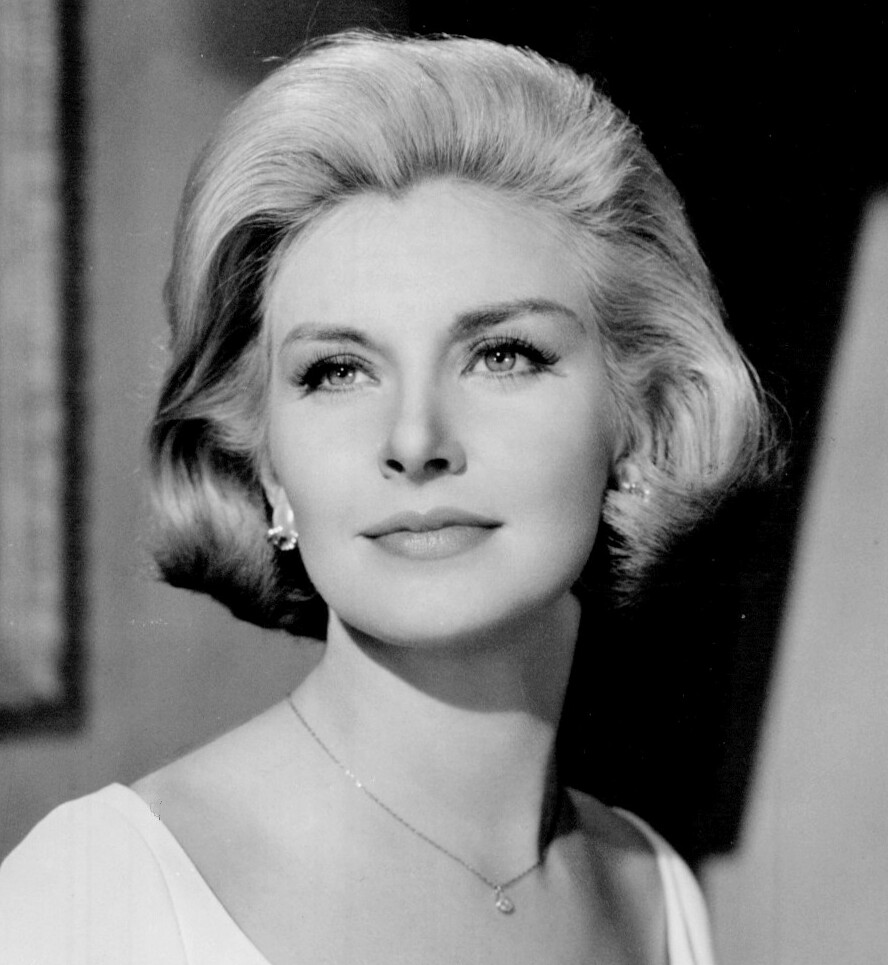
Joanne Woodward won for See How She Runs (1978) and Do You Remember Love (1985).

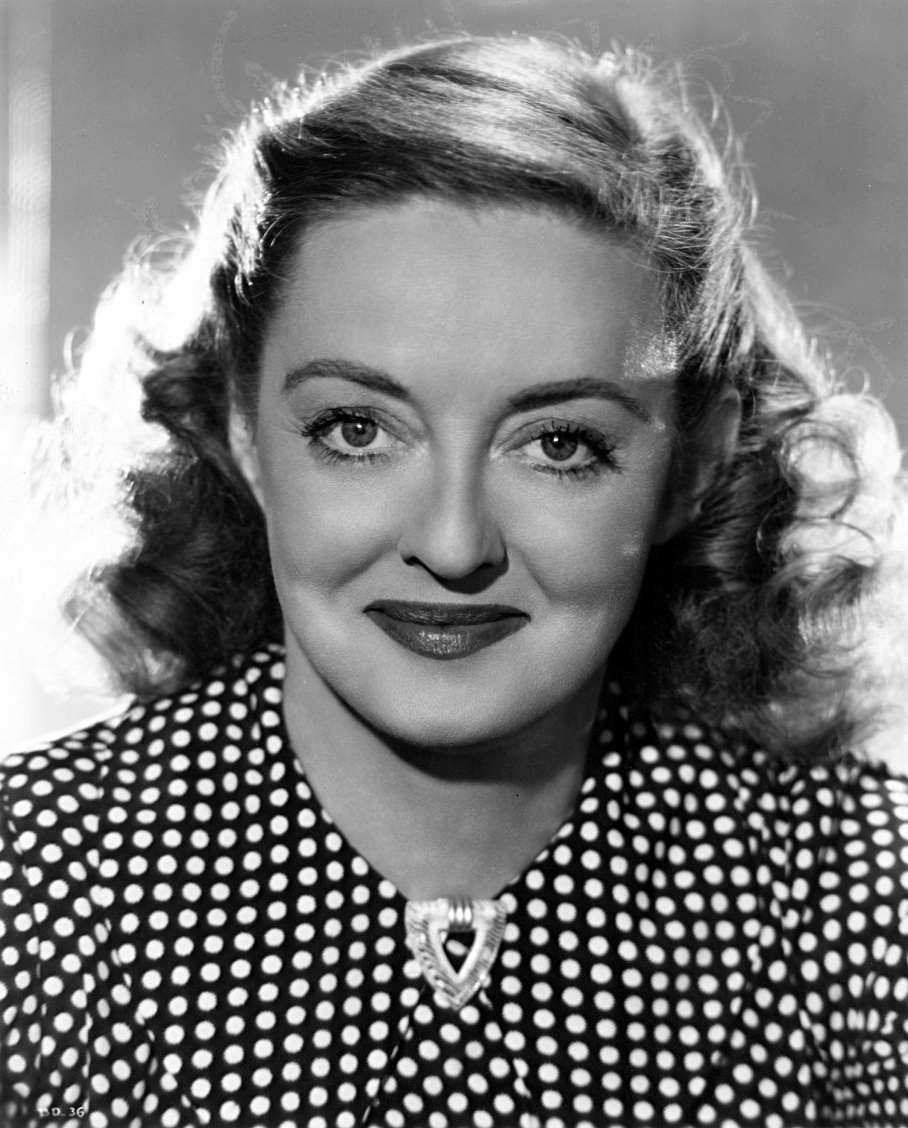
Bette Davis won for Strangers: The Story of a Mother and Daughter (1979).

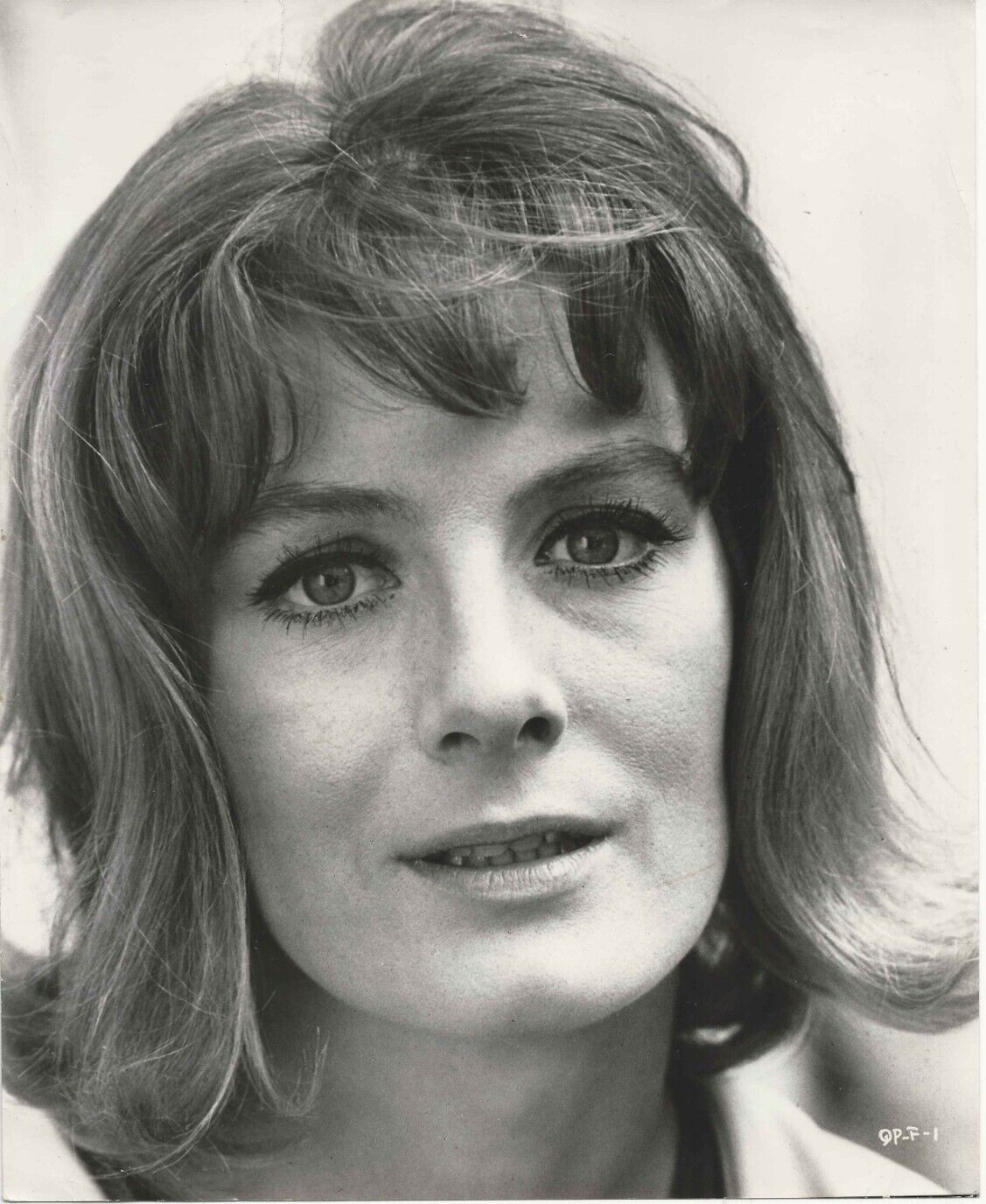
Vanessa Redgrave won for Playing for Time (1980).

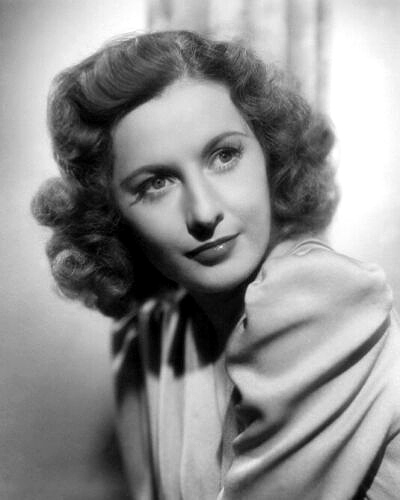
Barbara Stanwyck won for The Thorn Birds (1983).

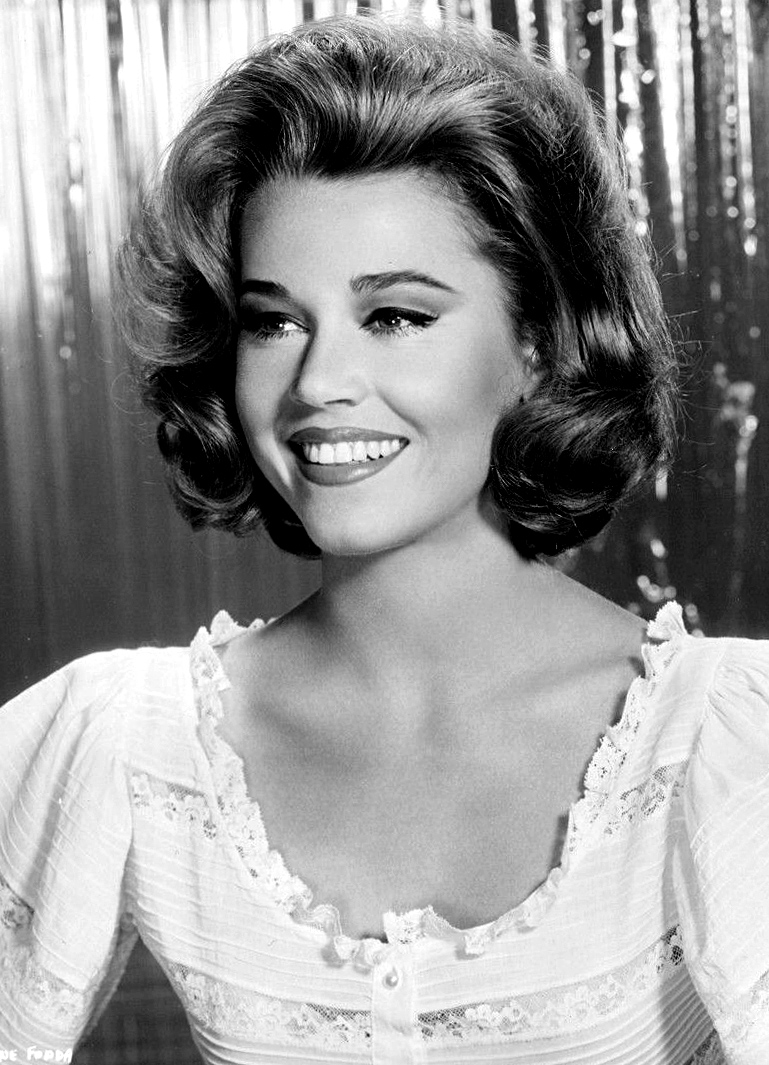
Jane Fonda won for The Dollmaker (1984).

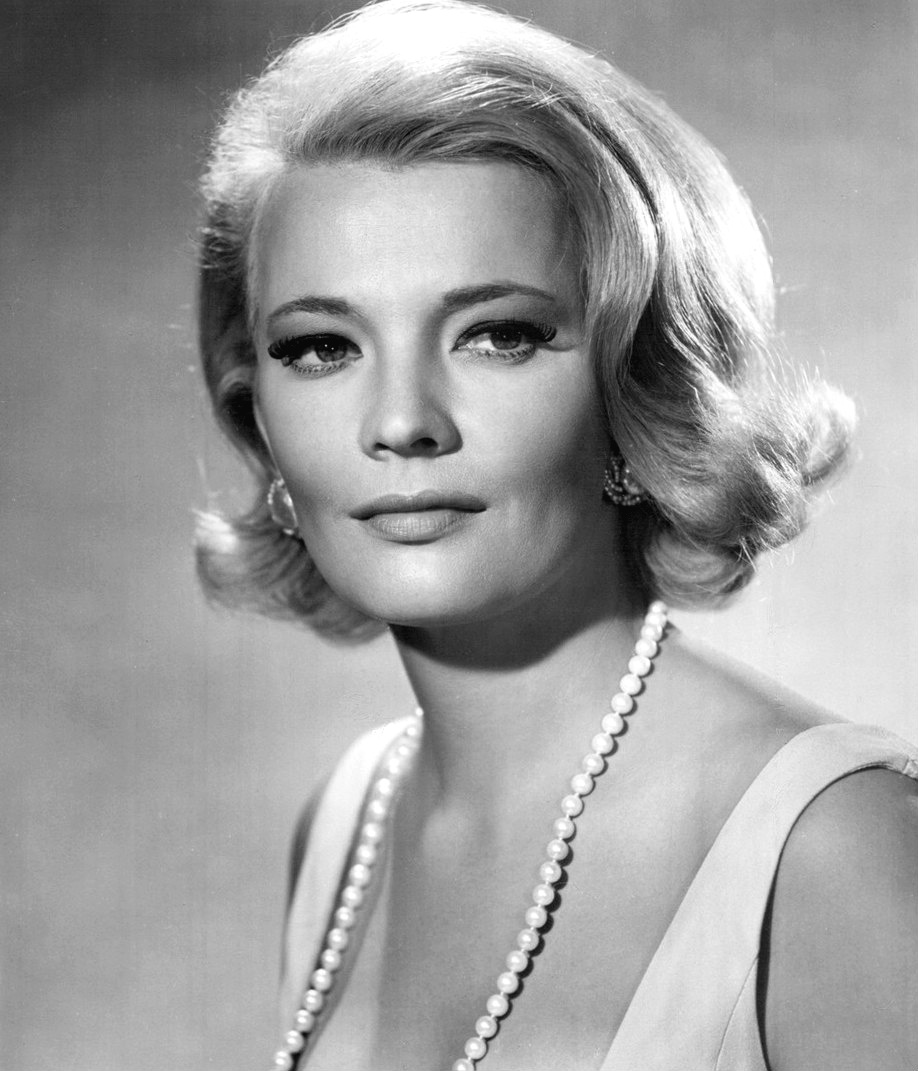
Gena Rowlands won twice for The Betty Ford Story (1987)a and Face of a Stranger (1992).

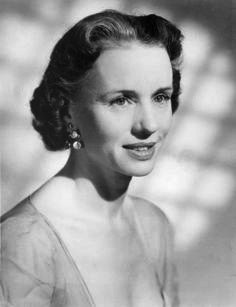
Jessica Tandy won for Foxfire (1987).

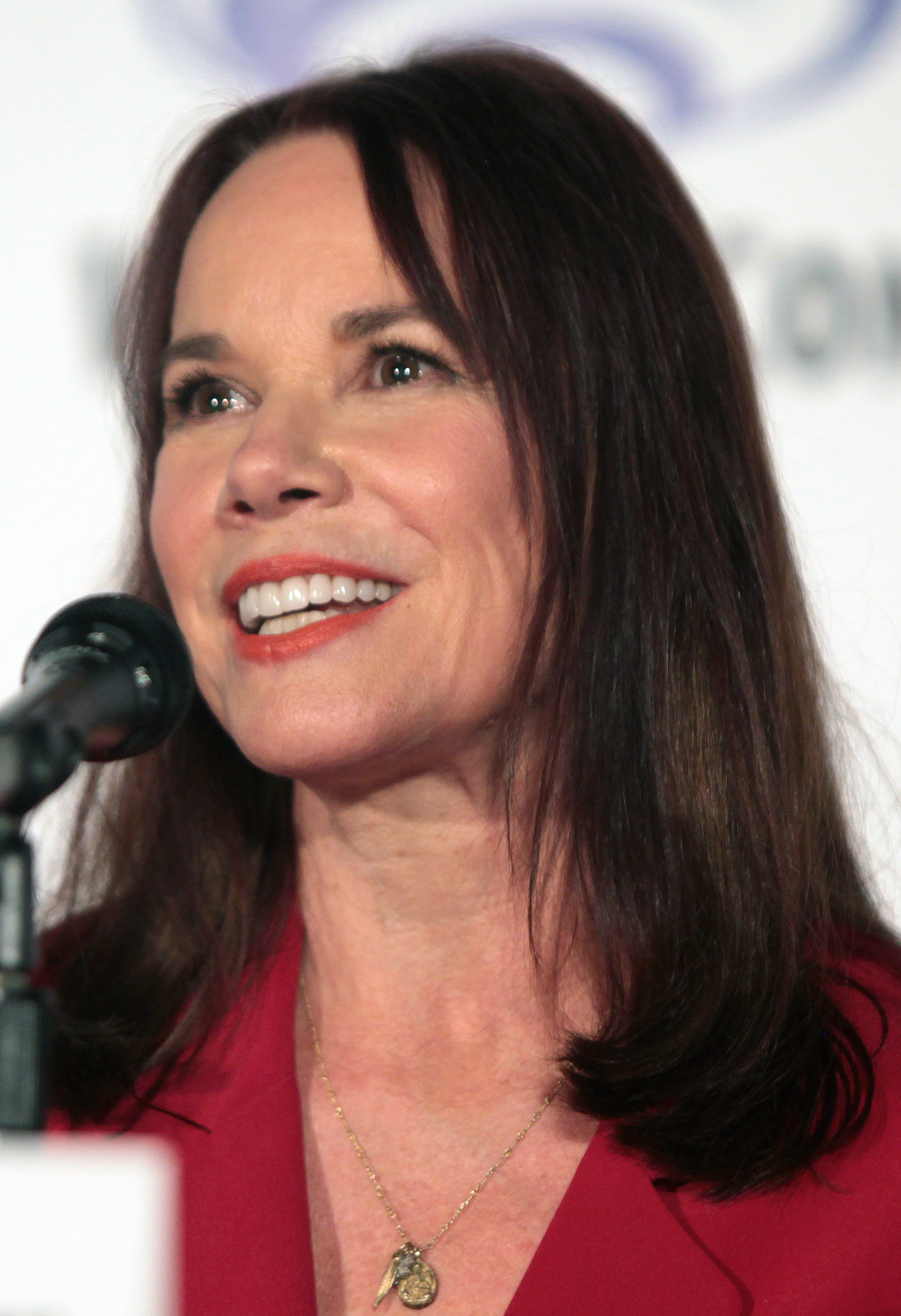
Barbara Hershey won for A Killing in a Small Town (1990).

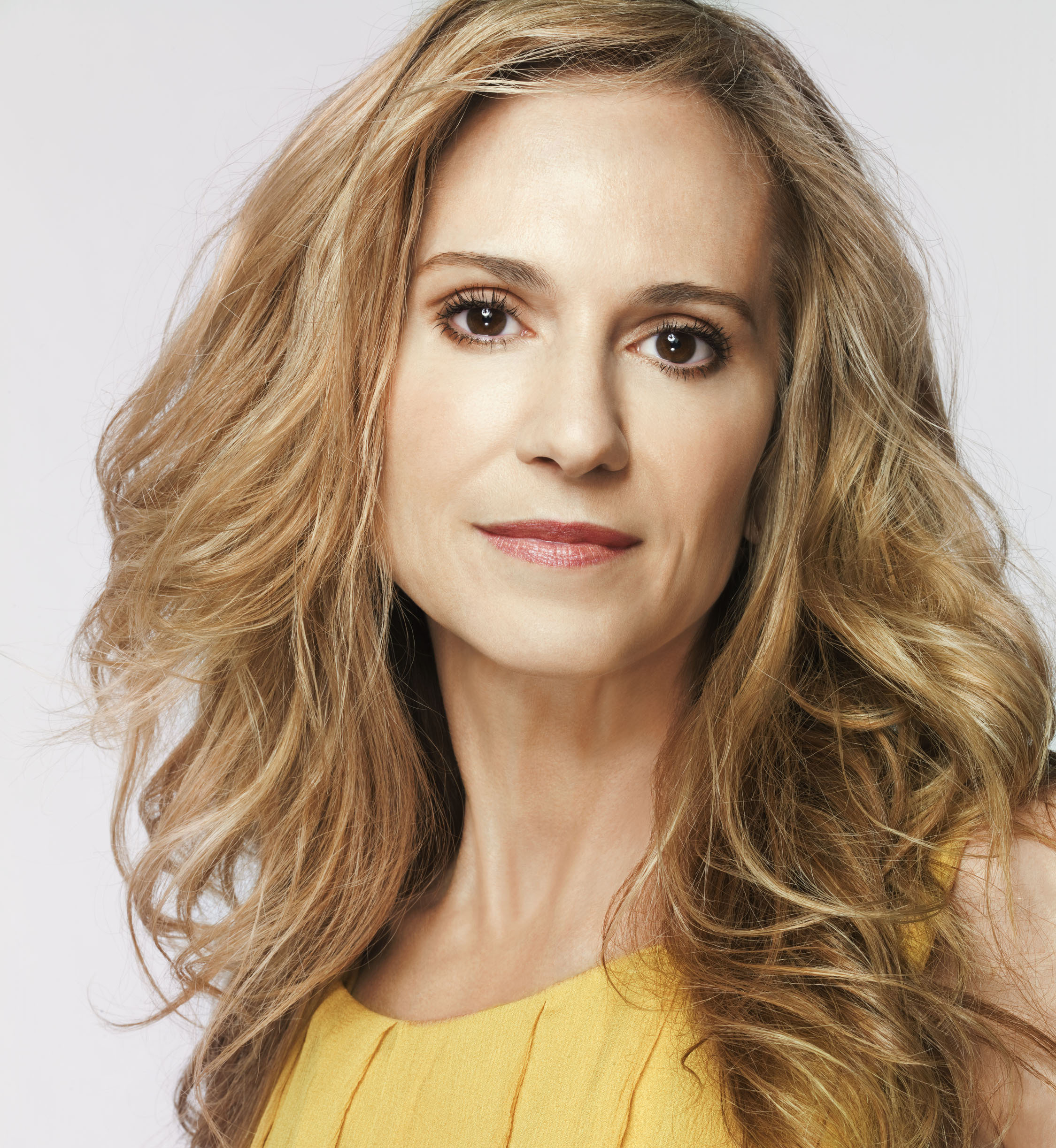
Holly Hunter won for The Positively True Adventures of the Alleged Texas Cheerleader-Murdering Mom (1993).

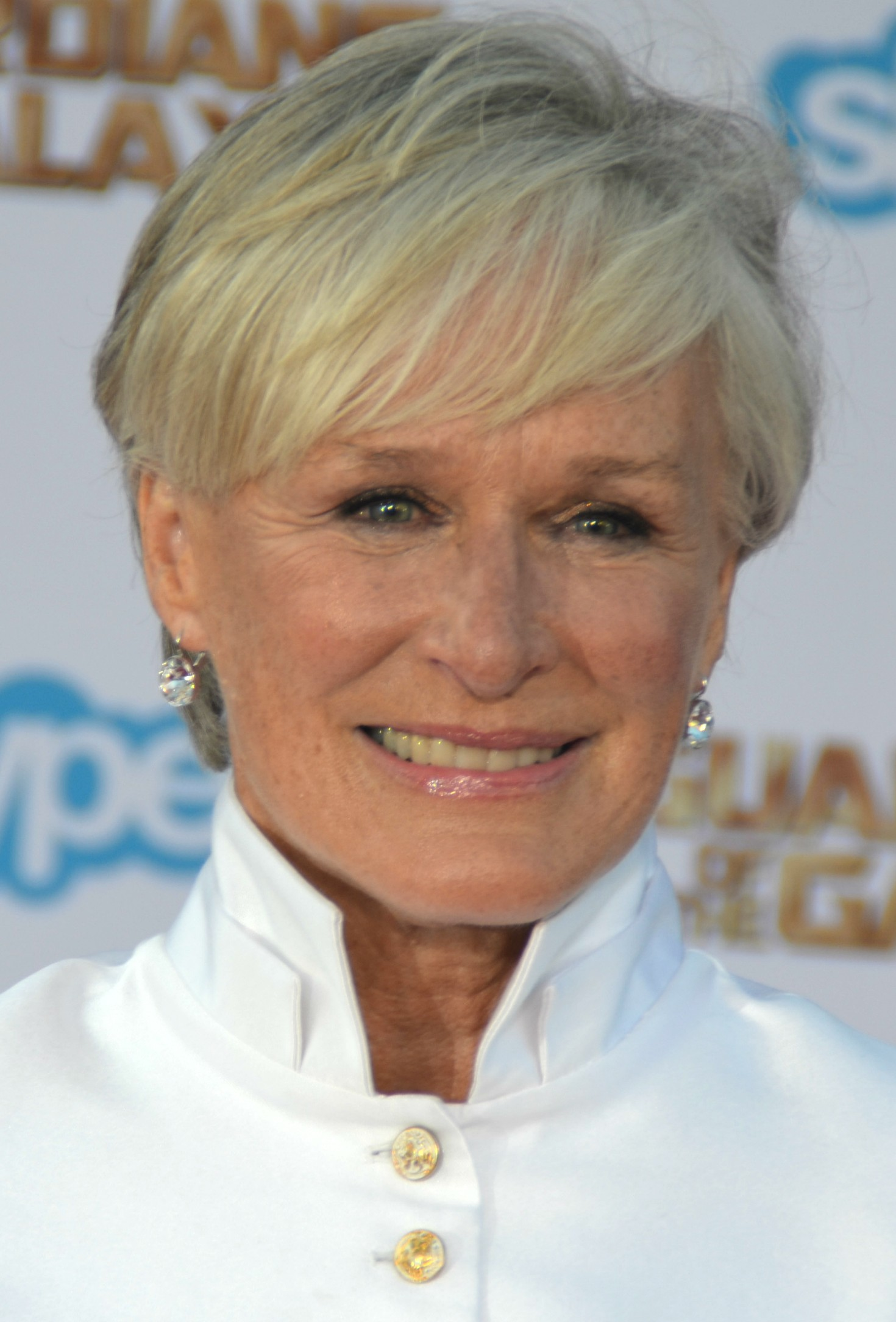
Glenn Close won for Serving in Silence: The Margarethe Cammermeyer Story (1995)

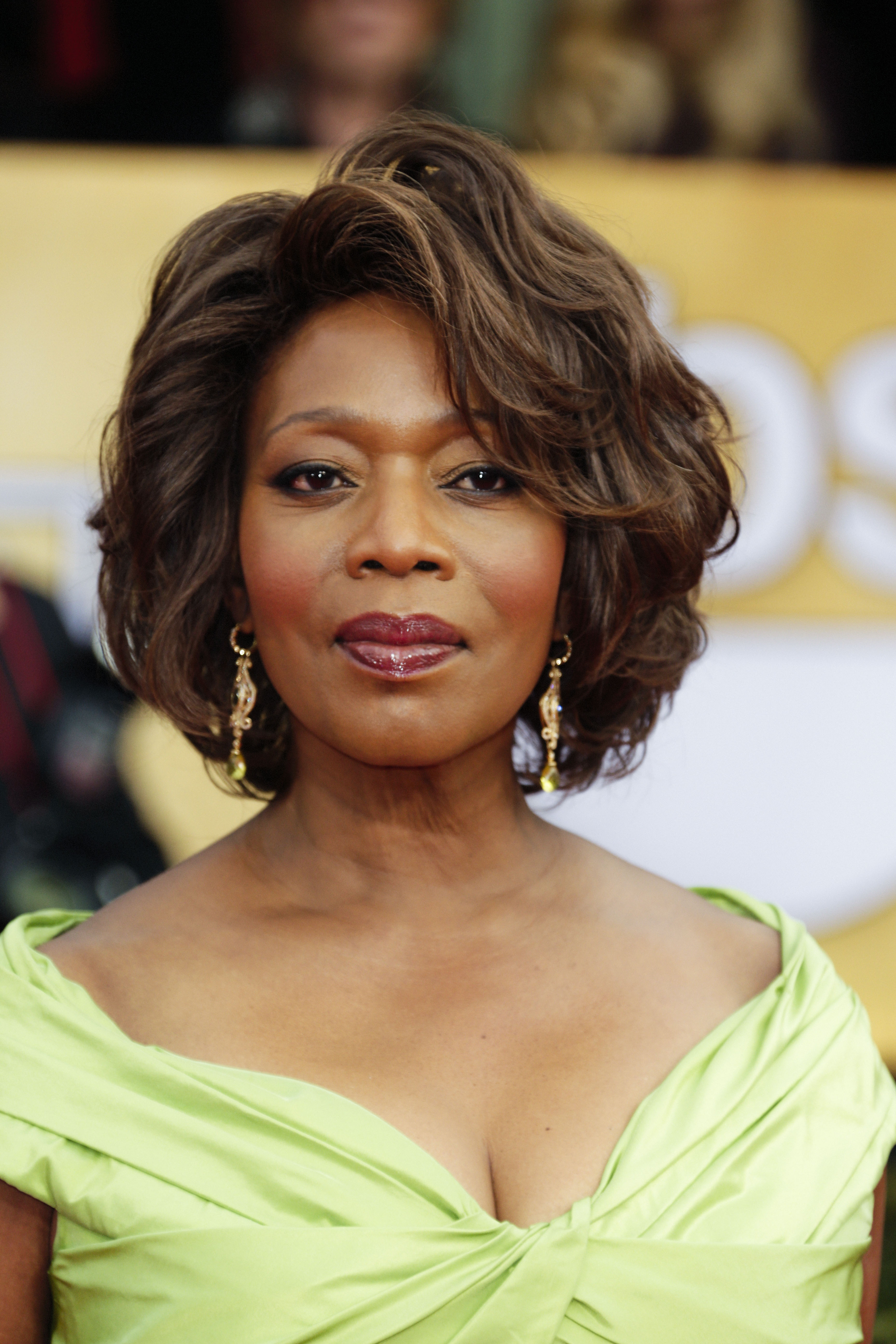
Alfre Woodard won for Miss Evers' Boys (1997).

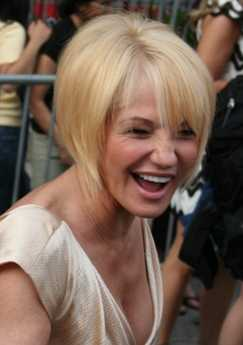
Ellen Barkin won for Before Women Had Wings (1998).

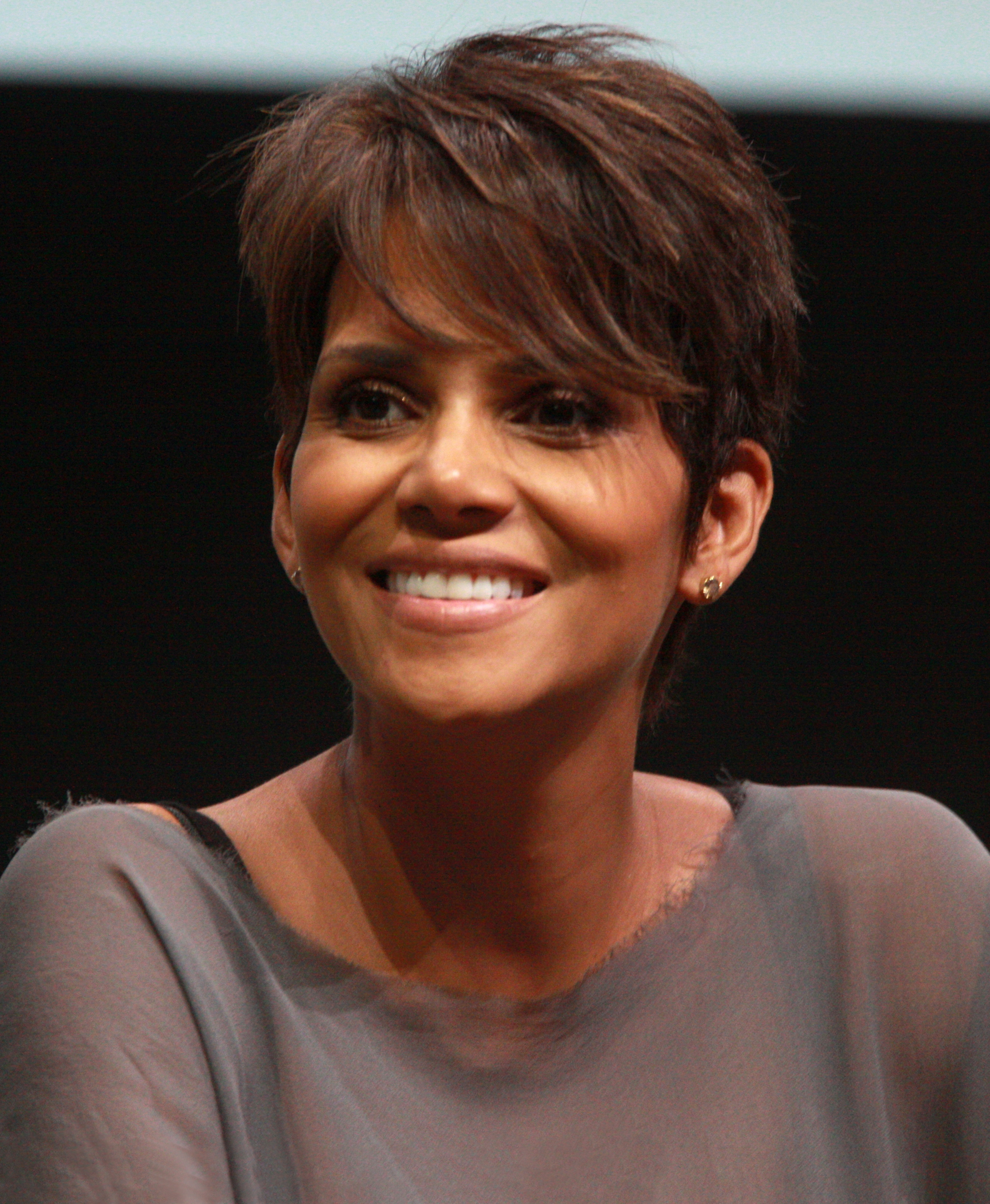
Halle Berry won for Introducing Dorothy Dandridge (2000)

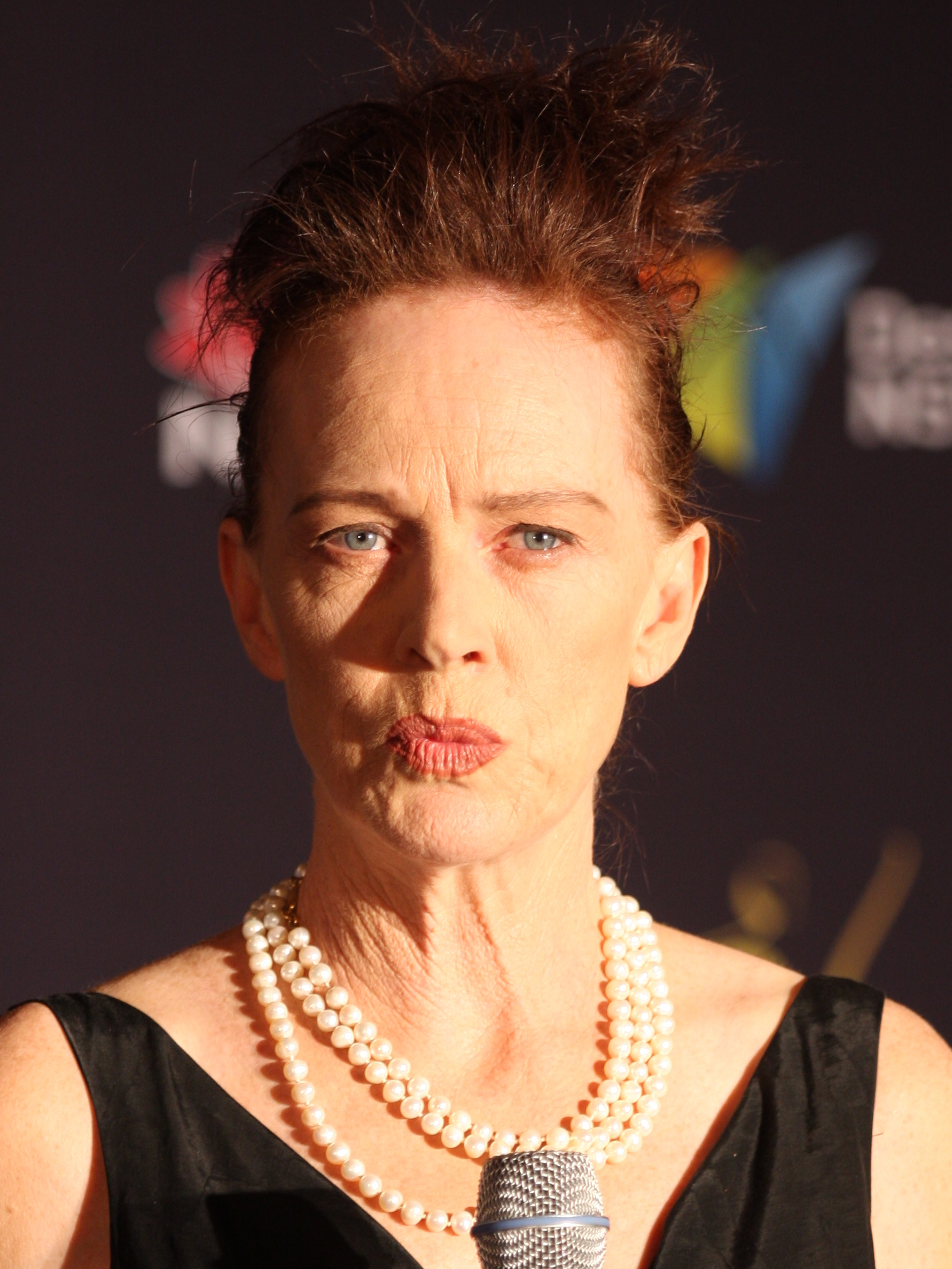
Judy Davis won for Life with Judy Garland: Me and My Shadows (2001)

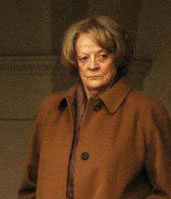
Maggie Smith won for My House in Umbria (2003).

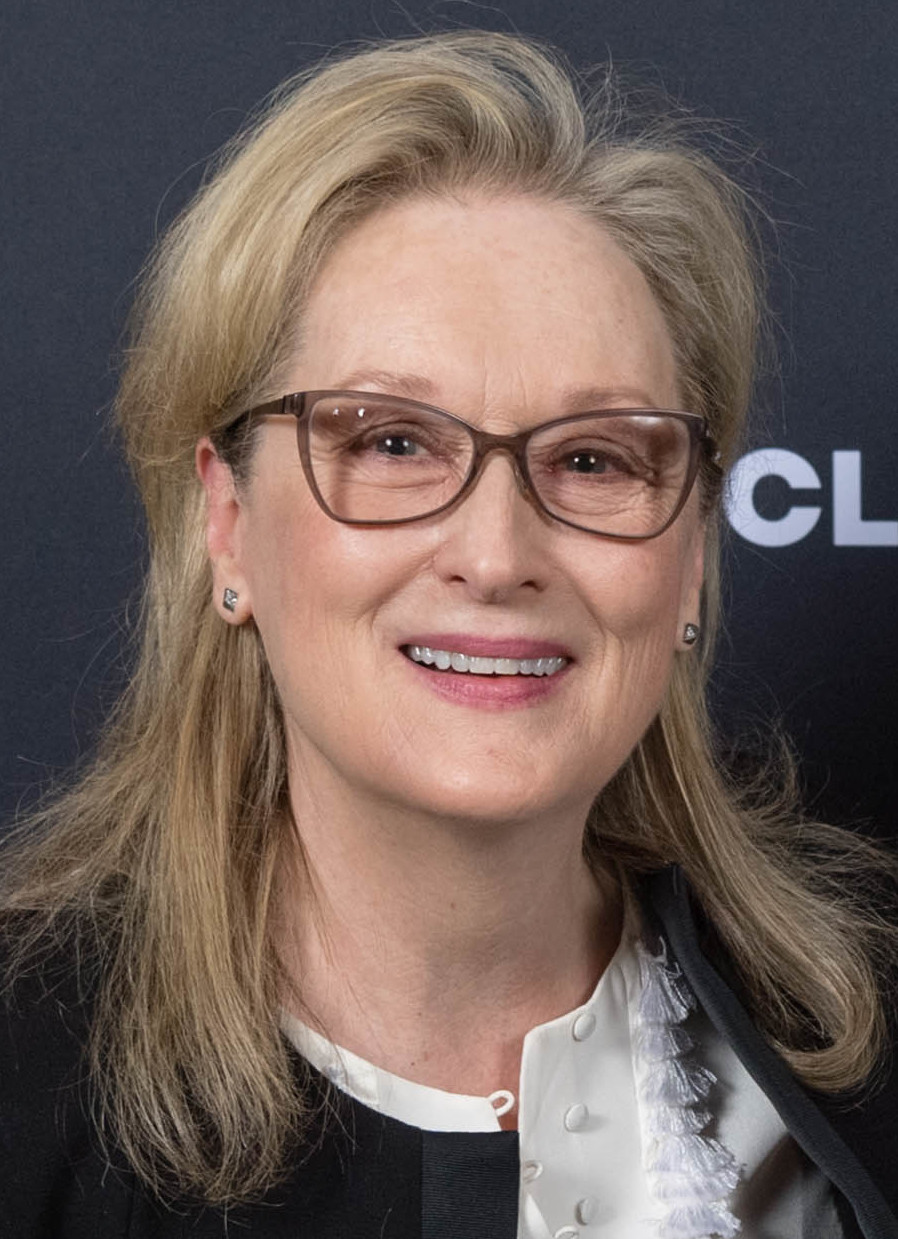
Meryl Streep won twice for Holocaust (1978) and Angels in America (2004).

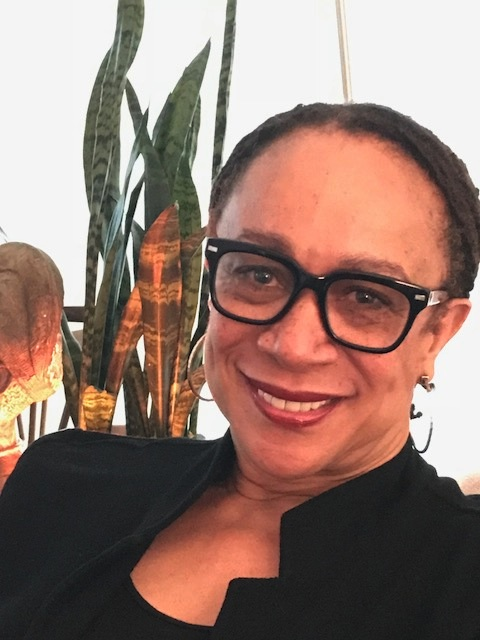
S. Epatha Merkerson won for Lackawanna Blues (2005).

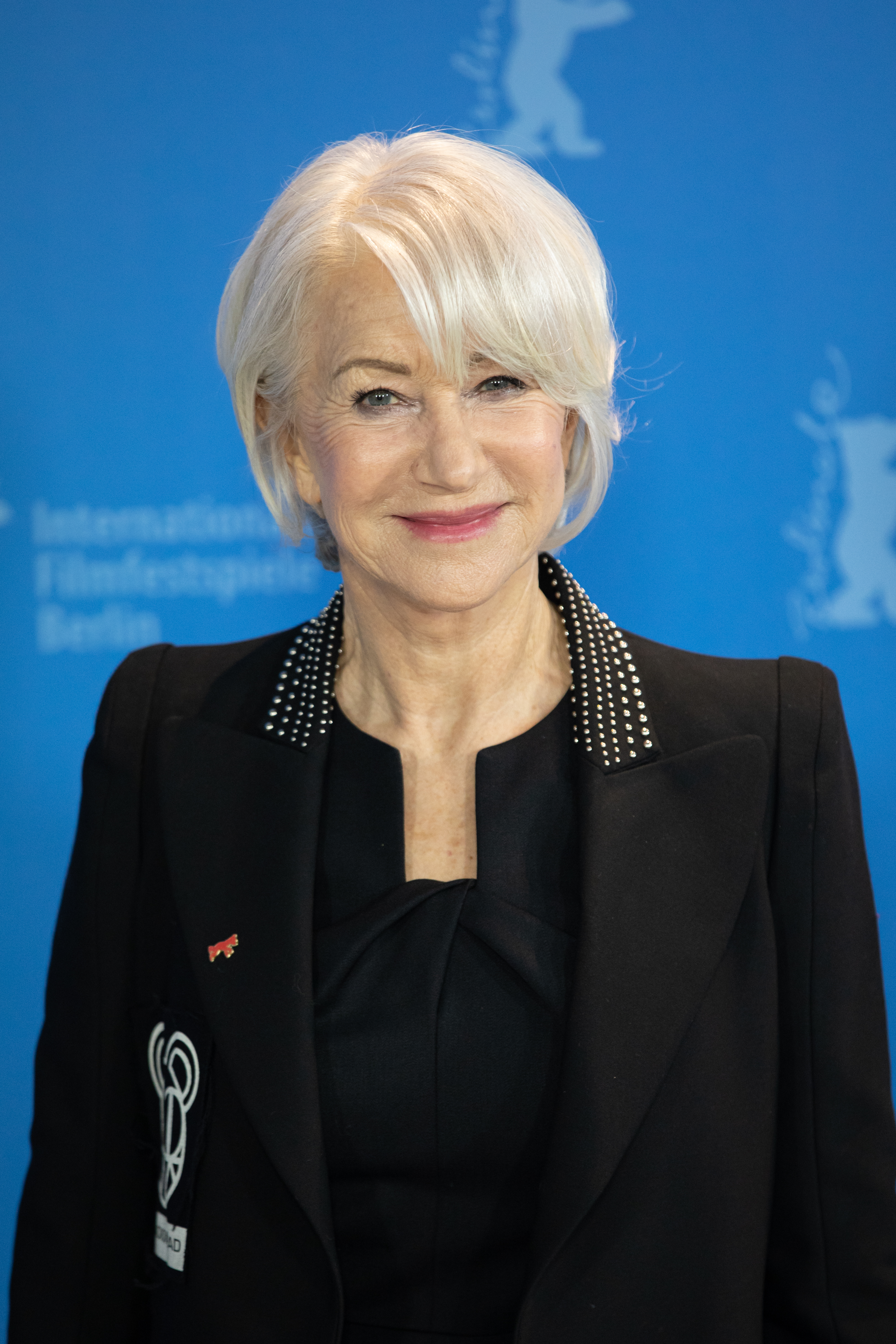
Helen Mirren won the award four times for Prime Suspect: Scent of Darkness (1996), The Passion of Ayn Rand (1999), Elizabeth I (2006), and Prime Suspect: The Final Act (2007)

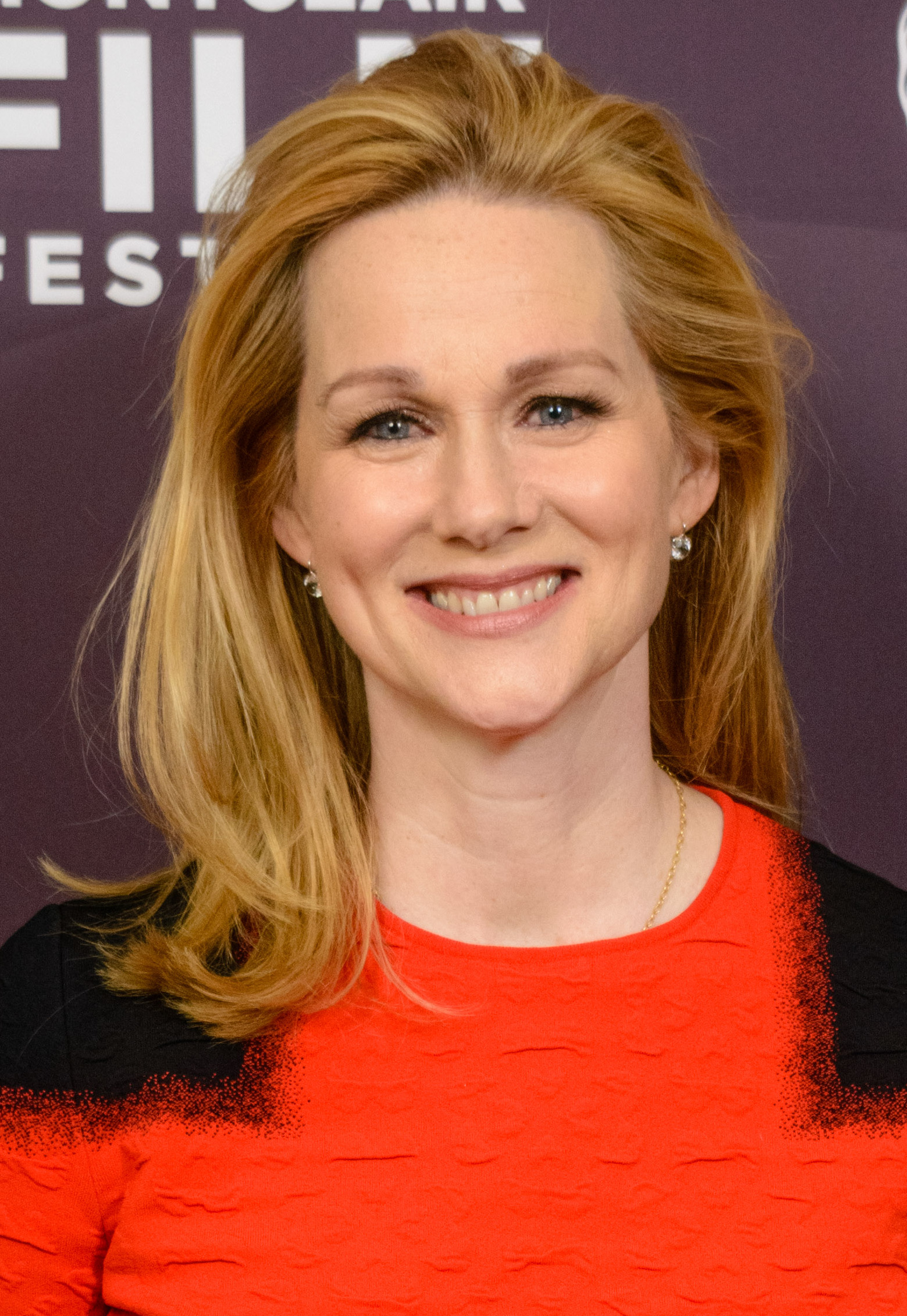
Laura Linney won thrice for Wild Iris (2001), John Adams, and The Big C: Hereafter (2013).

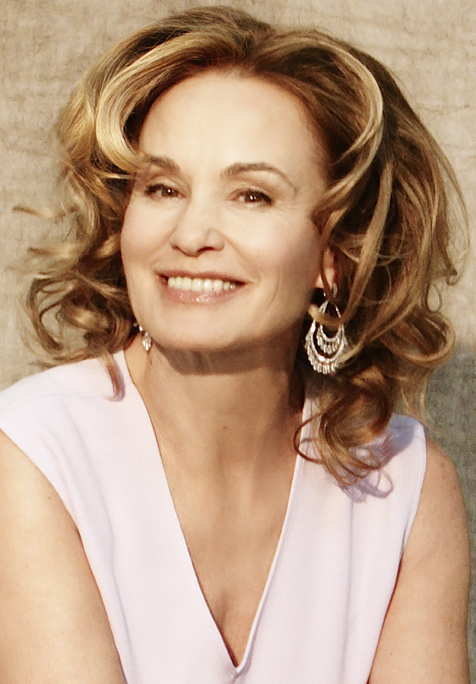
Jessica Lange won the award twice: for her performances in Grey Gardens (2009) and American Horror Story: Coven (2014).

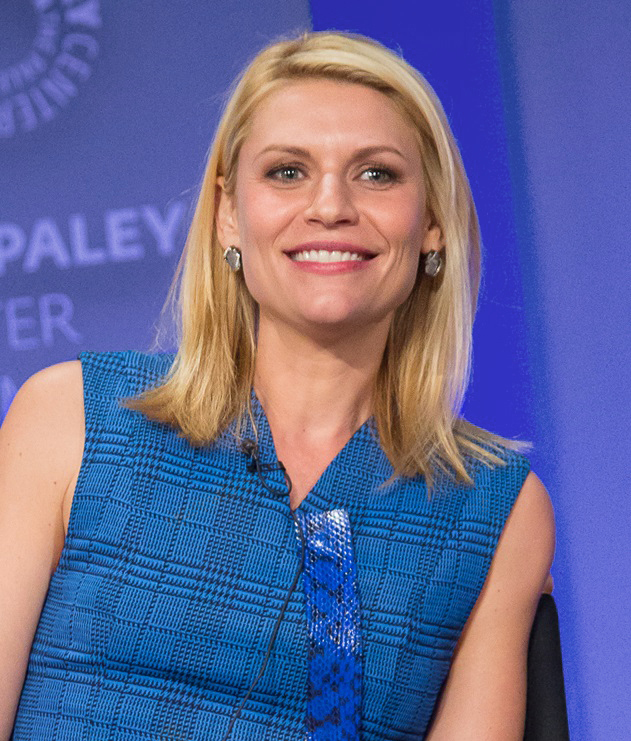
Claire Danes won in 2010 for her portrayal of Temple Grandin in the eponymous film.

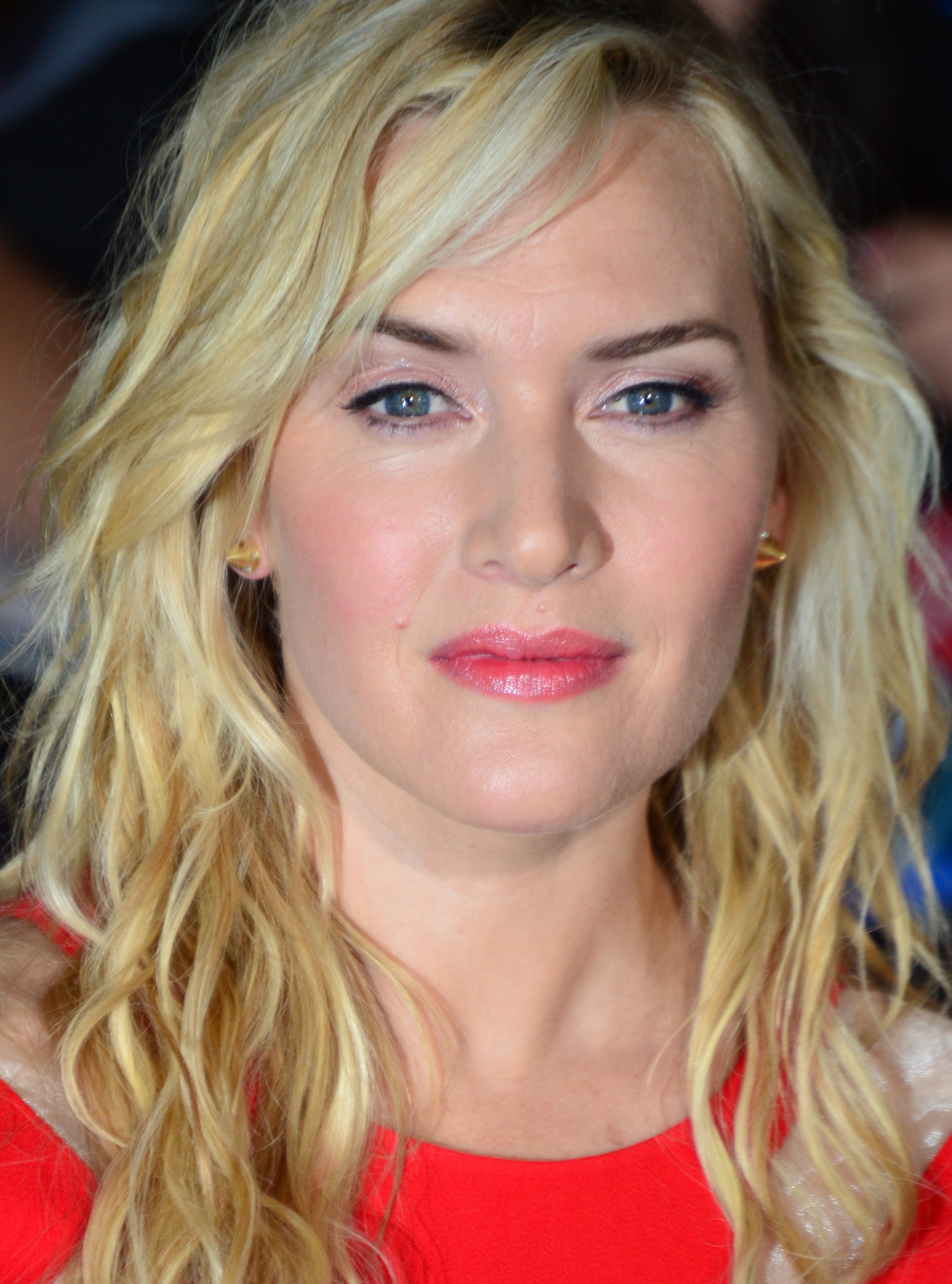
Kate Winslet won twice for her roles in Mildred Pierce (2011) and Mare of Easttown (2021)

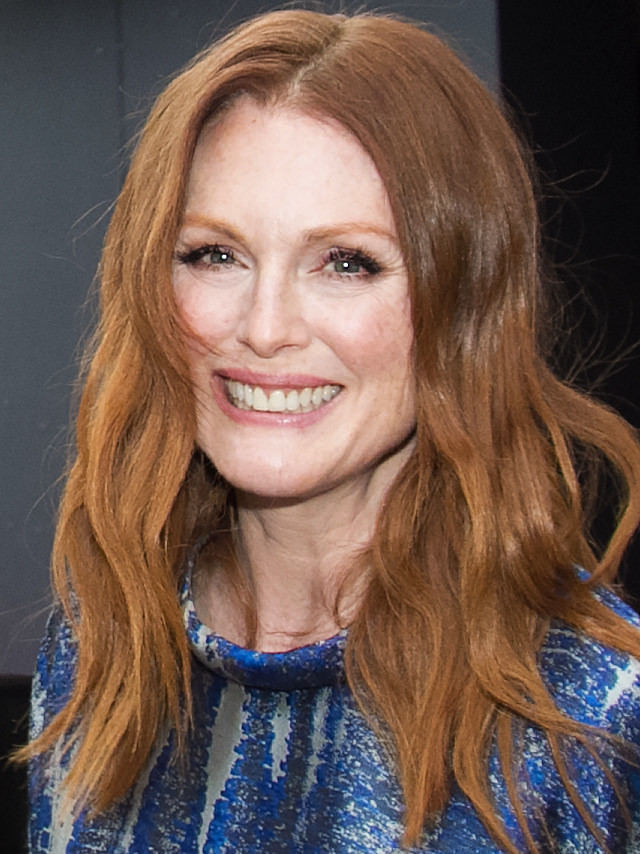
Julianne Moore won for her portrayal of Sarah Palin in Game Change (2012)

Frances McDormand won for Olive Kitteridge (2015)

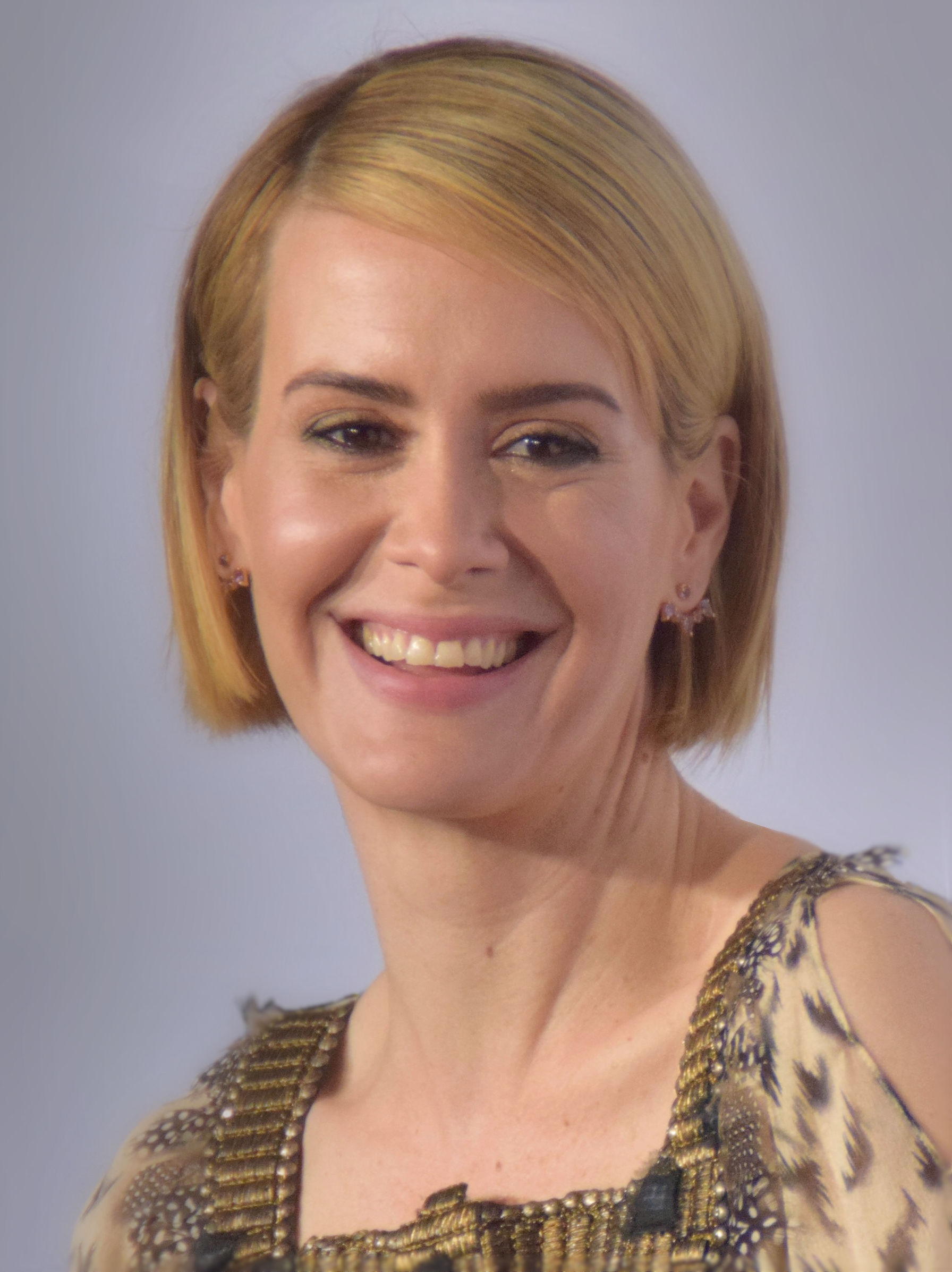
Sarah Paulson won in 2016 for her portrayal of Marcia Clark in the limited mini-series The People v. O. J. Simpson: American Crime Story.

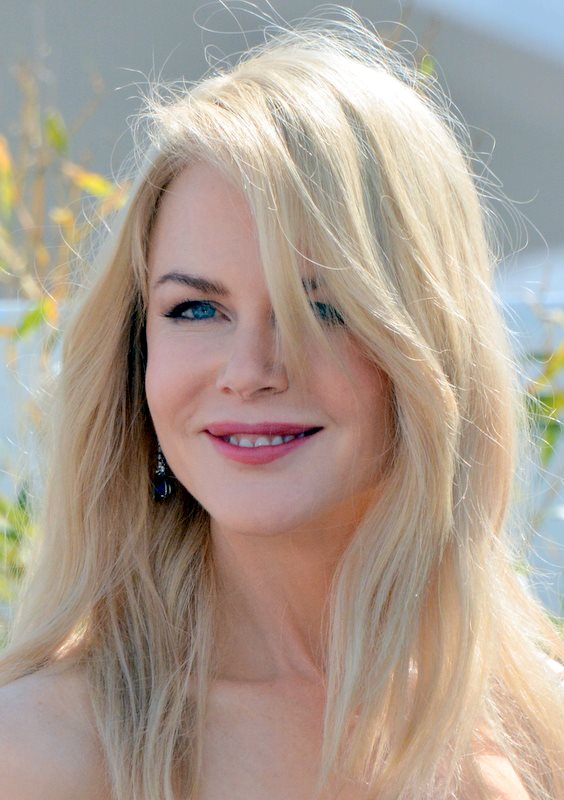
Nicole Kidman won for Big Little Lies (2017)

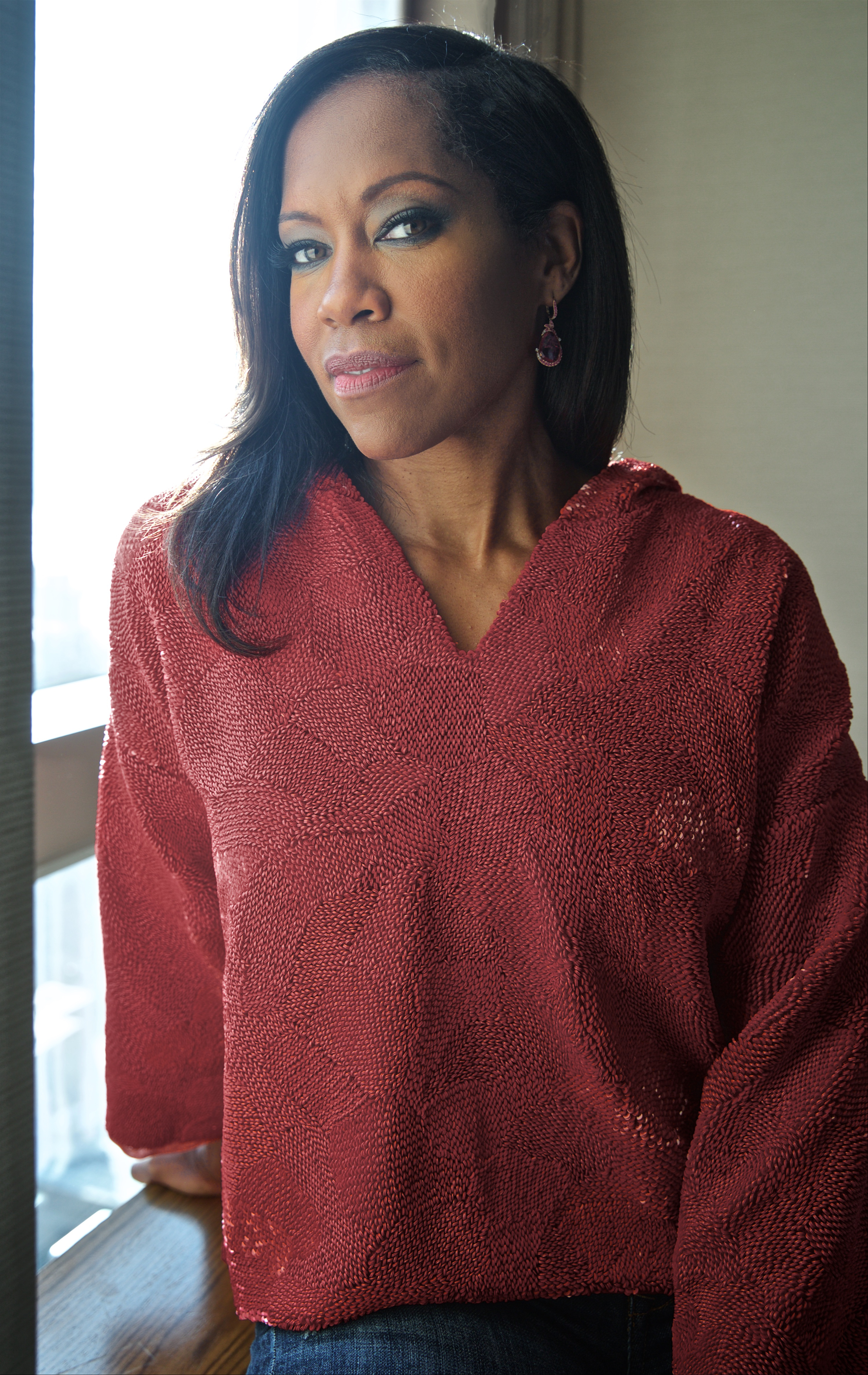
Regina King won twice for Seven Seconds (2018) and Watchmen (2020)

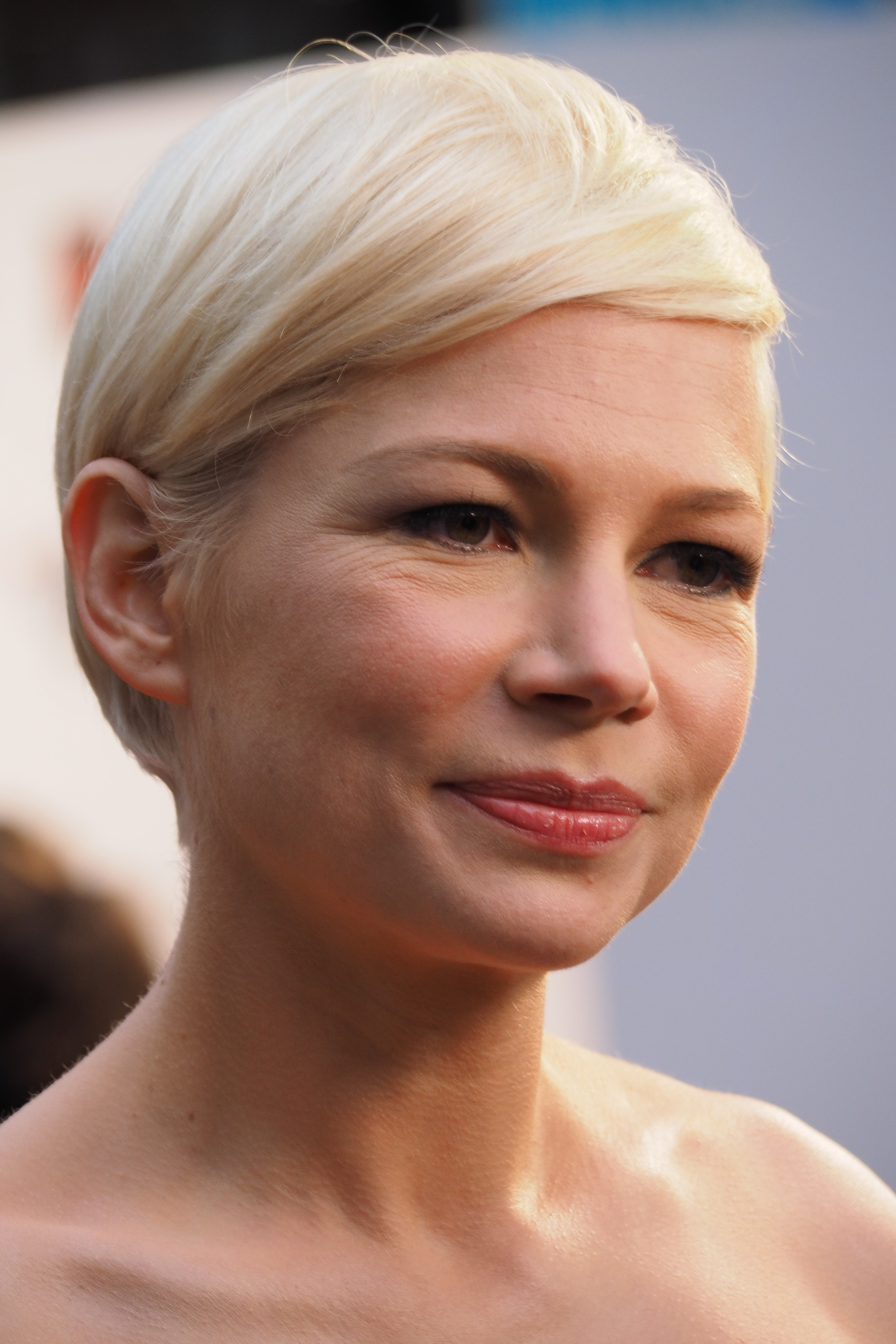
Michelle Williams won for Fosse/Verdon (2019)

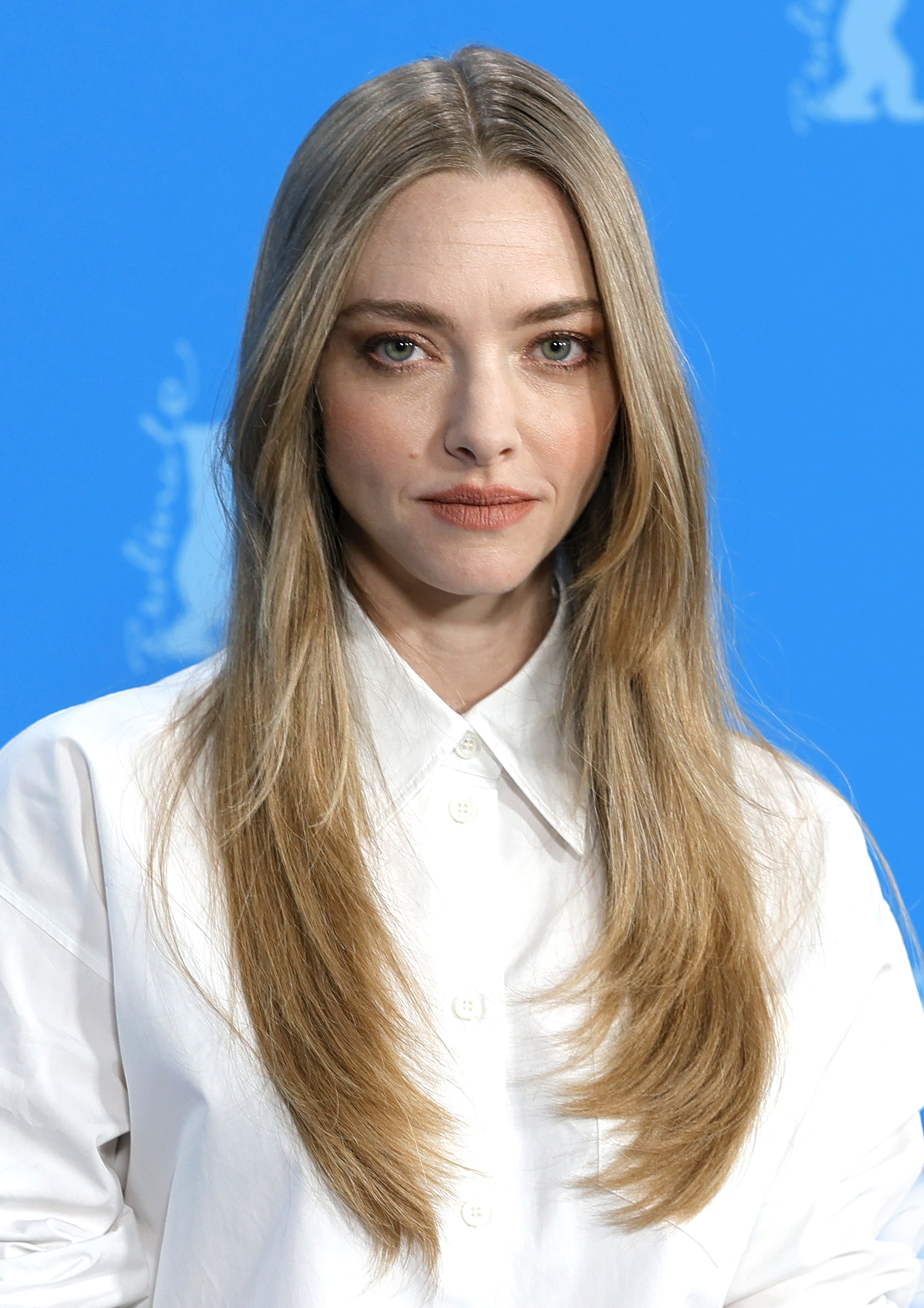
Amanda Seyfried won for playing Elizabeth Holmes in The Dropout (2022)

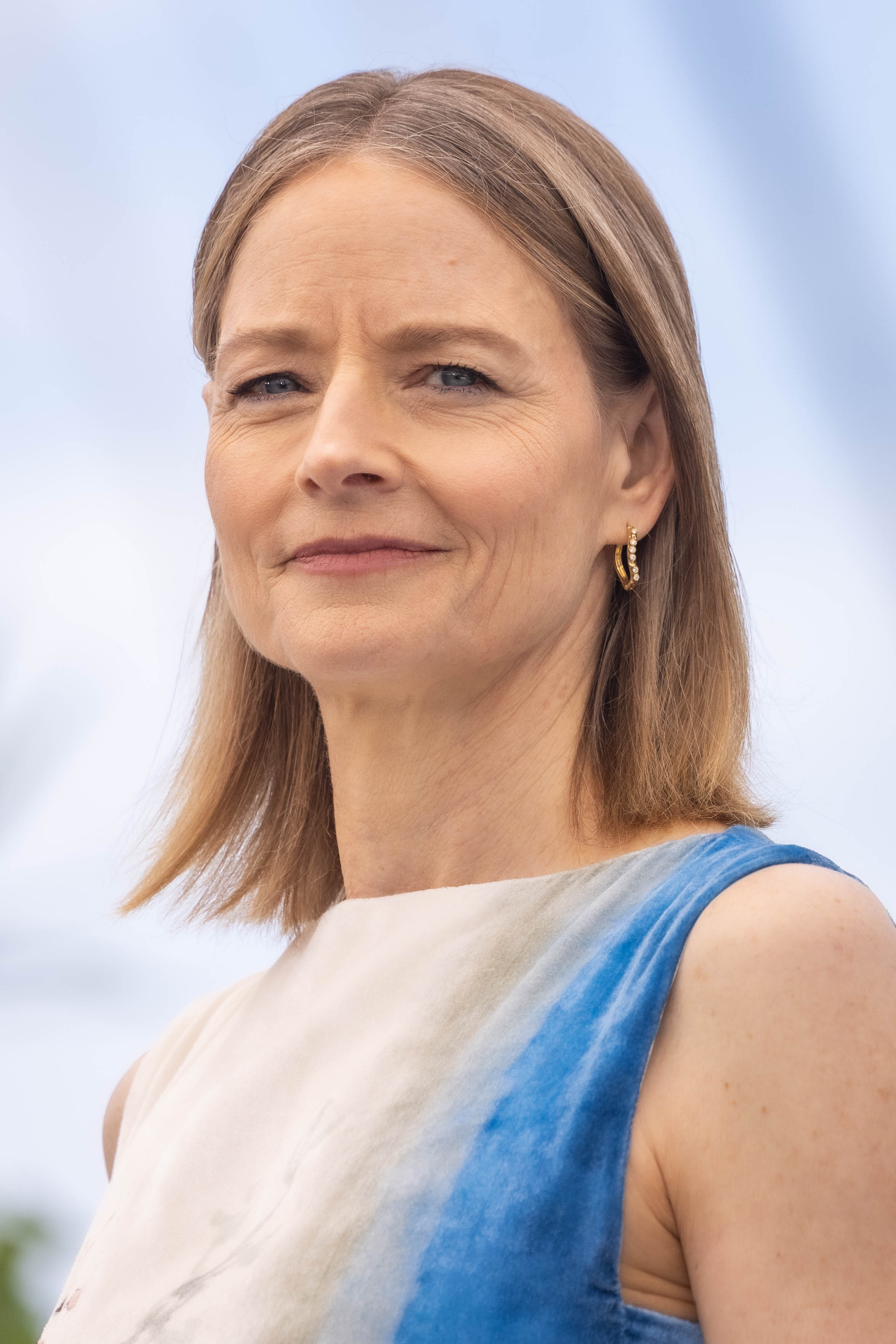
Jodie Foster won for True Detective: Night Country (2024)

Table key
| Indicates the winner |

=== 1950s ===
| Year | Actress | Role | Program | Episode | Network |
Best Actress in a Single Performance
1955 (7th)
| 1955 (7th) | Judith Anderson | Lady Macbeth | Hallmark Hall of Fame | "Macbeth" | NBC |
| 1955 (7th) | Ethel Barrymore | Mme. Rosalie La Grange | Climax! | "The Thirteenth Chair" | CBS |
| 1955 (7th) | Beverly Garland | Estelle Collins | Medic | "White Is the Color" | NBC |
| 1955 (7th) | Ruth Hussey | Harriet Craig | Lux Video Theater | "Craig's Wife" | CBS |
| 1955 (7th) | Dorothy McGuire | Janet Spence | Climax! | "The Gioconda Smile" | CBS |
| 1955 (7th) | Eva Marie Saint | Betty | The Philco Television Playhouse | "Middle of the Night" | NBC |
| 1955 (7th) | Claire Trevor | Ellen Creed | Lux Video Theater | "Ladies in Retirement" | CBS |
1956 (8th)
| 1956 (8th) | Mary Martin | Peter Pan | Producers' Showcase | "Peter Pan" | NBC |
| 1956 (8th) | Julie Harris | Shevawn | The United States Steel Hour | "A Wind from the South" | CBS |
| 1956 (8th) | Eva Marie Saint | Emily | Producers' Showcase | "Our Town" | NBC |
| 1956 (8th) | Jessica Tandy | The Wife | Producers' Showcase | "The Fourposter" | NBC |
| 1956 (8th) | Loretta Young | Sadie | The Loretta Young Show | "Christmas Stopover" | NBC |
1957 (9th)
| 1957 (9th) | Claire Trevor | Fran Dodsworth | Producers' Showcase | "Dodsworth" | NBC |
| 1957 (9th) | Edna Best | Ethel Gibbons | Ford Star Jubilee | "This Happy Breed" | CBS |
| 1957 (9th) | Gracie Fields | Sarah Dowey | The United States Steel Hour | "The Old Lady Shows Her Medals" | CBS |
| 1957 (9th) | Nancy Kelly | Sister M. Aquinas | Studio One | "The Pilot" | CBS |
| 1957 (9th) | Evelyn Rudie | Eloise | Playhouse 90 | "Eloise" | CBS |
Best Single Performance by an Actress – Lead or Support
1958 (10th)
| 1958 (10th) | Polly Bergen | Helen Morgan | Playhouse 90 | "The Helen Morgan Story" | CBS |
| 1958 (10th) | Julie Andrews | Cinderella | Cinderella | | CBS |
| 1958 (10th) | Helen Hayes | Mrs. Gilling | The Alcoa Hour | "Mrs. Gilling and the Skyscraper" | NBC |
| 1958 (10th) | Piper Laurie | Ruth Cornelius | Studio One | "The Deaf Heart" | CBS |
| 1958 (10th) | Teresa Wright | Annie Sullivan | Playhouse 90 | "The Miracle Worker" | CBS |
Best Single Performance by an Actress
1959 (11th)
| 1959 (11th) | Julie Harris | Bridgid Mary | Hallmark Hall of Fame | "Little Moon of Alban" | CBS |
| 1959 (11th) | Judith Anderson | Marquesa de Montemayor | The DuPont Show of the Month | "The Bridge of San Luis Rey" | CBS |
| 1959 (11th) | Helen Hayes | Mother Seraphim | The United States Steel Hour | "One Red Rose for Christmas" | CBS |
| 1959 (11th) | Piper Laurie | Kirsten Clay | Playhouse 90 | "Days of Wine and Roses" | CBS |
| 1959 (11th) | Geraldine Page | The Young Woman | Playhouse 90 | "The Old Man" | CBS |
| 1959 (11th) | Maureen Stapleton | Sadie Burke | Kraft Television Theatre | "All the Kings Men" | NBC |

=== 1960s ===
| Year | Actress | Role | Program | Episode | Network |
Outstanding Single Performance by an Actress (Lead or Support)
1960 (12th)
| 1960 (12th) | Ingrid Bergman | The Governess | Startime | "The Turn of the Screw" | NBC |
| 1960 (12th) | Julie Harris | Mattie Silver | DuPont Show of the Month | "Ethan Frome" | CBS |
| 1960 (12th) | Teresa Wright | Margaret Bourke-White | NBC Sunday Showcase | "The Margaret Bourke-White Story" | NBC |
Outstanding Single Performance by an Actress in a Leading Role
1961 (13th)
| 1961 (13th) | Judith Anderson | Lady Macbeth | Hallmark Hall of Fame | "Macbeth" | NBC |
| 1961 (13th) | Ingrid Bergman | Clare Lester | Twenty-Four Hours in a Woman's Life | | CBS |
| 1961 (13th) | Elizabeth Montgomery | Rusty Heller | The Untouchables | "The Rusty Heller Story" | NBC |
1962 (14th)
| 1962 (14th) | Julie Harris | Queen Victoria | Hallmark Hall of Fame | "Victoria Regina" | NBC |
| 1962 (14th) | Geraldine Brooks | Katherine Barnes | Bus Stop | "Call Back Yesterday" | ABC |
| 1962 (14th) | Suzanne Pleshette | Julie Lawler | Dr. Kildare | "Shining Image" | NBC |
| 1962 (14th) | Inger Stevens | Anna Beza | The Dick Powell Theatre | "The Price of Tomatoes" | NBC |
| 1962 (14th) | Ethel Waters | Jenny Henderson | Route 66 | "Goodnight, Sweet Blues" | CBS |
1963 (15th)
| 1963 (15th) | Kim Stanley | Faith Parsons | Ben Casey | "A Cardinal Act of Mercy" | ABC |
| 1963 (15th) | Diahann Carroll | Ruby Jay | Naked City | "A Horse Has a Big Head, Let Him Worry" | ABC |
| 1963 (15th) | Diana Hyland | Liza Laurents | Alcoa Premiere | "The Voice of Charlie Point" | ABC |
| 1963 (15th) | Eleanor Parker | Connie Folson | The Eleventh Hour | "Why Am I Grown So Cold?" | NBC |
| 1963 (15th) | Sylvia Sidney | Adela | The Defenders | "The Madman" | CBS |
1964 (16th)
| 1964 (16th) | Shelley Winters | Jenny Dworak | Bob Hope Presents the Chrysler Theatre | "Two is the Number" | NBC |
| 1964 (16th) | Ruby Dee | Jenny Bishop | The Doctors and the Nurses | "Express Stop from Lennox Avenue" | CBS |
| 1964 (16th) | Bethel Leslie | Ellen Dudley | The Richard Boone Show | "Statement of Fact" | NBC |
| 1964 (16th) | Jeanette Nolan | Jessie McCoony | The Richard Boone Show | "Vote No on 11!" | NBC |
| 1964 (16th) | Diana Sands | Ruth | East Side/West Side | "Who Do You Kill?" | CBS |
Outstanding Individual Achievements in Entertainment - Actors and Performers
1965 (17th)
| 1965 (17th) | Lynn Fontanne | Fanny Bowditch Holmes | Hallmark Hall of Fame | "The Magnificent Yankee" | NBC |
Outstanding Single Performance by an Actress in a Leading Role in a Drama
1966 (18th)
| 1966 (18th) | Simone Signoret | Sara Lescault | Bob Hope Presents the Chrysler Theatre | "A Small Rebellion" | NBC |
| 1966 (18th) | Eartha Kitt | Angel | I Spy | "The Loser" | NBC |
| 1966 (18th) | Margaret Leighton | Chris Becker | Dr. Kildare | "A Life for a Life" | NBC |
| 1966 (18th) | Shelley Winters | Edith | Bob Hope Presents the Chrysler Theatre | "Back to Back" | NBC |
1967 (19th)
| 1967 (19th) | Geraldine Page | Sook | ABC Stage 67 | "Truman Capote's A Christmas Memory" | ABC |
| 1967 (19th) | Shirley Booth | Amanda Wingfield | CBS Playhouse | "The Glass Menagerie" | CBS |
| 1967 (19th) | Mildred Dunnock | Linda Loman | Death of a Salesman | | CBS |
| 1967 (19th) | Lynn Fontanne | Grand Duchess Marie | Hallmark Hall of Fame | "Anastasia" | NBC |
| 1967 (19th) | Julie Harris | Anastasia | Hallmark Hall of Fame | "Anastasia" | NBC |
1968 (20th)
| 1968 (20th) | Maureen Stapleton | Mary O'Meaghan | Among the Paths to Eden | | ABC |
| 1968 (20th) | Judith Anderson | Queen Elizabeth I | Hallmark Hall of Fame | "Elizabeth the Queen" | NBC |
| 1968 (20th) | Geneviève Bujold | Joan of Arc | Hallmark Hall of Fame | "Saint Joan" | NBC |
| 1968 (20th) | Colleen Dewhurst | Elizabeth Proctor | The Crucible | | CBS |
| 1968 (20th) | Anne Jackson | Vivian Spears | CBS Playhouse | "Dear Friends" | CBS |
Outstanding Single Performance by an Actress in a Leading Role
1969 (21st)
| 1969 (21st) | Geraldine Page | Sook | The Thanksgiving Visitor | | ABC |
| 1969 (21st) | Anne Baxter | Betty-Jean Currier | The Name of the Game | "The Bobby Currier Story" | NBC |
| 1969 (21st) | Lee Grant | Kay Gould | Judd, for the Defense | "The Gates of Cerberus" | ABC |

=== 1970s ===
| Year | Actress | Role | Program | Network |
Outstanding Single Performance by an Actress in a Leading Role
1970 (22nd)
| 1970 (22nd) | Patty Duke | Marlene Chambers | My Sweet Charlie | NBC |
| 1970 (22nd) | Edith Evans | Aunt Betsy Trotwood | David Copperfield | NBC |
| 1970 (22nd) | Shirley Jones | Katherine Johnson | Silent Night, Lonely Night | NBC |
1971 (23rd)
| 1971 (23rd) | Lee Grant | Carrie Miller | The Neon Ceiling | NBC |
| 1971 (23rd) | Colleen Dewhurst | Mrs. Franz | The Price | NBC |
| 1971 (23rd) | Lee Grant | Leslie Williams | Ransom for a Dead Man | NBC |
1972 (24th)
| 1972 (24th) | Glenda Jackson | Queen Elizabeth I | Elizabeth R: The Shadow in the Sun | PBS |
| 1972 (24th) | Helen Hayes | Sophie Tate Curtis | Do Not Fold, Spindle or Mutilate | ABC |
| 1972 (24th) | Glenda Jackson | Queen Elizabeth I | Elizabeth R: The Lion's Cub | PBS |
| 1972 (24th) | Patricia Neal | Olivia Walton | The Homecoming: A Christmas Story | CBS |
| 1972 (24th) | Susannah York | Jane Eyre | Jane Eyre | NBC |
1973 (25th)
| 1973 (25th) | Cloris Leachman | Victoria Douglas | A Brand New Life | ABC |
| 1973 (25th) | Lauren Bacall | Margo Channing | Applause | CBS |
| 1973 (25th) | Hope Lange | Janet Salter | That Certain Summer | ABC |
| 1973 (25th) | Outstanding Continued Performance by an Actress in a Leading Role (Drama/Comedy - Limited Episodes) | | | |
| 1973 (25th) | Susan Hampshire | Becky Sharp | Vanity Fair | PBS |
| 1973 (25th) | Vivien Heilbron | Rachel Verinder | The Moonstone | PBS |
| 1973 (25th) | Margaret Tyzack | Bette | Cousin Bette | PBS |
1974 (26th)
| 1974 (26th) | Best Lead Actress in a Drama | | | |
| 1974 (26th) | Cicely Tyson | Jane Pittman | The Autobiography of Miss Jane Pittman | CBS |
| 1974 (26th) | Carol Burnett | Anne Miller | 6 Rms Riv Vu | CBS |
| 1974 (26th) | Katharine Hepburn | Amanda Wingfield | The Glass Menagerie | ABC |
| 1974 (26th) | Cloris Leachman | Viola Barlow | The Migrants | CBS |
| 1974 (26th) | Elizabeth Montgomery | Ellen Harrod | A Case of Rape | PBS |
| 1974 (26th) | Best Lead Actress in a Limited Series | | | |
| 1974 (26th) | Mildred Natwick | Gwendolyn Snoop Nicholson | The Snoop Sisters | NBC |
| 1974 (26th) | Helen Hayes | Ernesta Snoop | The Snoop Sisters | NBC |
| 1974 (26th) | Lee Remick | Cassie Walters | The Blue Knight | NBC |
1975 (27th)
| 1975 (27th) | Outstanding Lead Actress in a Special Program – Drama or Comedy | | | |
| 1975 (27th) | Katharine Hepburn | Jessica Medlicott | Love Among the Ruins | ABC |
| 1975 (27th) | Jill Clayburgh | Wanda | Hustling | ABC |
| 1975 (27th) | Elizabeth Montgomery | Lizzie Borden | The Legend of Lizzie Borden | ABC |
| 1975 (27th) | Diana Rigg | Philippa | In This House of Brede | CBS |
| 1975 (27th) | Maureen Stapleton | Bea Asher | Queen of the Stardust Ballroom | CBS |
| 1975 (27th) | Outstanding Lead Actress in a Limited Series | | | |
| 1975 (27th) | Jessica Walter | Amy Prentiss | Amy Prentiss | NBC |
| 1975 (27th) | Susan Saint James | Sally McMillan | McMillan & Wife | NBC |
1976 (28th)
| 1976 (28th) | Outstanding Lead Actress in a Special Program – Drama or Comedy | | | |
| 1976 (28th) | Susan Clark | Babe Didrikson Zaharias | Babe | CBS |
| 1976 (28th) | Jane Alexander | Eleanor Roosevelt | Eleanor and Franklin | ABC |
| 1976 (28th) | Colleen Dewhurst | Josie Hogan | A Moon for the Misbegotten | ABC |
| 1976 (28th) | Sada Thompson | Phoebe Rice | The Entertainer | NBC |
| 1976 (28th) | Outstanding Lead Actress in a Limited Series | | | |
| 1976 (28th) | Rosemary Harris | George Sand | Notorious Woman | PBS |
| 1976 (28th) | Susan Blakely | Julie Prescott | Rich Man, Poor Man | ABC |
| 1976 (28th) | Jean Marsh | Rose | Upstairs, Downstairs | PBS |
| 1976 (28th) | Lee Remick | Lady Randolph Churchill | Jennie: Lady Randolph Churchill | PBS |
1977 (29th)
| 1977 (29th) | Outstanding Lead Actress in a Special Program – Drama or Comedy | | | |
| 1977 (29th) | Sally Field | Sybil | Sybil | NBC |
| 1977 (29th) | Jane Alexander | Eleanor Roosevelt | Eleanor and Franklin: The White House Years | ABC |
| 1977 (29th) | Susan Clark | Amelia Earhart | Amelia Earhart | NBC |
| 1977 (29th) | Julie Harris | Mary Todd Lincoln | The Last of Mrs. Lincoln | PBS |
| 1977 (29th) | Joanne Woodward | Dr. Cornelia Wilbur | Sybil | NBC |
| 1977 (29th) | Outstanding Lead Actress in a Limited Series | | | |
| 1977 (29th) | Patty Duke | Bernadette Hennessy Armagh | Captains and the Kings | NBC |
| 1977 (29th) | Dori Brenner | Rhoda Gold Blackman | Seventh Avenue | NBC |
| 1977 (29th) | Susan Flannery | Margot Bracken | The Moneychangers | NBC |
| 1977 (29th) | Eva Marie Saint | Katherine Macaran | How the West Was Won | ABC |
| 1977 (29th) | Jane Seymour | Marjorie Chisolm | Captains and the Kings | NBC |
1978 (30th)
| 1978 (30th) | Outstanding Lead Actress in a Drama or Comedy Special | | | |
| 1978 (30th) | Joanne Woodward | Betty Quinn | See How She Runs | CBS |
| 1978 (30th) | Helen Hayes | Emma Long | A Family Upside Down | NBC |
| 1978 (30th) | Eva Marie Saint | Passenger | Taxi!!! | NBC |
| 1978 (30th) | Maureen Stapleton | Kate | The Gathering | ABC |
| 1978 (30th) | Sada Thompson | Mrs. Gibbs | Our Town | NBC |
| 1978 (30th) | Outstanding Lead Actress in a Limited Series | | | |
| 1978 (30th) | Meryl Streep | Inga Helms-Weiss | Holocaust | NBC |
| 1978 (30th) | Rosemary Harris | Berta Palitz Weiss | Holocaust | NBC |
| 1978 (30th) | Elizabeth Montgomery | Sayward Luckett Wheeler | The Awakening Land | NBC |
| 1978 (30th) | Lee Remick | Erica Trenton | Wheels | NBC |
| 1978 (30th) | Cicely Tyson | Coretta Scott King | King | NBC |
Outstanding Lead Actress in a Limited Series or Special
1979 (31st)
| 1979 (31st) | Bette Davis | Lucy Mason | Strangers: The Story of a Mother and Daughter | CBS |
| 1979 (31st) | Carol Burnett | Peg Mullen | Friendly Fire | ABC |
| 1979 (31st) | Olivia Cole | Maggie Rogers | Backstairs at the White House | NBC |
| 1979 (31st) | Katharine Hepburn | Miss Lily Moffat | The Corn Is Green | CBS |
| 1979 (31st) | Mary Tyler Moore | Betty Rollin | First, You Cry | CBS |

=== 1980s ===
| Year | Actress | Role | Program | Network |
Outstanding Lead Actress in a Limited Series or Special
1980 (32nd)
| 1980 (32nd) | Patty Duke | Annie Sullivan | The Miracle Worker | NBC |
| 1980 (32nd) | Bette Davis | Estelle Malone | White Mama | CBS |
| 1980 (32nd) | Melissa Gilbert | Helen Keller | The Miracle Worker | NBC |
| 1980 (32nd) | Lee Remick | Margaret Sullivan | Haywire | CBS |
1981 (33rd)
| 1981 (33rd) | Vanessa Redgrave | Fania Fénelon | Playing for Time | CBS |
| 1981 (33rd) | Ellen Burstyn | Jean Harris | The People vs. Jean Harris | NBC |
| 1981 (33rd) | Catherine Hicks | Marilyn Monroe | Marilyn: The Untold Story | ABC |
| 1981 (33rd) | Yoko Shimada | Lady Toda Buntaro | Shōgun | NBC |
| 1981 (33rd) | Joanne Woodward | Elizabeth Huckaby | Crisis at Central High | CBS |
1982 (34th)
| 1982 (34th) | Ingrid Bergman (post-humously) | Golda Meir | A Woman Called Golda | Syndicated |
| 1982 (34th) | Glenda Jackson | Patricia Neal | The Patricia Neal Story | CBS |
| 1982 (34th) | Ann Jillian | Mae West | Mae West | ABC |
| 1982 (34th) | Jean Stapleton | Eleanor Roosevelt | Eleanor, First Lady of the World | CBS |
| 1982 (34th) | Cicely Tyson | Marva Collins | The Marva Collins Story | CBS |
1983 (35th)
| 1983 (35th) | Barbara Stanwyck | Mary Carson | The Thorn Birds: Part 1 | ABC |
| 1983 (35th) | Ann-Margret | Lucile Fray | Who Will Love My Children? | ABC |
| 1983 (35th) | Rosanna Arquette | Nicole Baker | The Executioner's Song | NBC |
| 1983 (35th) | Mariette Hartley | Candy Lightner | M.A.D.D.: Mothers Against Drunk Drivers | NBC |
| 1983 (35th) | Angela Lansbury | Gertrude Vanderbilt Whitney | Little Gloria... Happy at Last | NBC |
1984 (36th)
| 1984 (36th) | Jane Fonda | Gertie Nevels | The Dollmaker | ABC |
| 1984 (36th) | Jane Alexander | Calamity Jane | Calamity Jane | CBS |
| 1984 (36th) | Ann-Margret | Blanche DuBois | A Streetcar Named Desire | ABC |
| 1984 (36th) | Glenn Close | Gail Bennett | Something About Amelia | ABC |
| 1984 (36th) | JoBeth Williams | Reve Walsh | Adam | NBC |
1985 (37th)
| 1985 (37th) | Joanne Woodward | Barbara Wyatt-Hollis | Do You Remember Love | CBS |
| 1985 (37th) | Jane Alexander | Hedda Hopper | Malice in Wonderland | CBS |
| 1985 (37th) | Peggy Ashcroft | Barbie Batchelor | The Jewel in the Crown | PBS |
| 1985 (37th) | Farrah Fawcett | Francine Hughes | The Burning Bed | NBC |
| 1985 (37th) | Mary Tyler Moore | Martha Weinman Lear | Heartsounds | ABC |
Outstanding Lead Actress in a Miniseries or Special
1986 (38th)
| 1986 (38th) | Marlo Thomas | Marie Balter | Nobody's Child | CBS |
| 1986 (38th) | Katharine Hepburn | Margaret Delafield | Mrs. Delafield Wants to Marry | CBS |
| 1986 (38th) | Vanessa Redgrave | Richard Radley and Renée Richards | Second Serve | CBS |
| 1986 (38th) | Gena Rowlands | Katherine Pierson | An Early Frost | NBC |
| 1986 (38th) | Mare Winningham | Margaret Ryder | Love Is Never Silent | NBC |
1987 (39th)
| 1987 (39th) | Gena Rowlands | Betty Ford | The Betty Ford Story | ABC |
| 1987 (39th) | Ann-Margret | Ann Arden Grenville | The Two Mrs. Grenvilles | NBC |
| 1987 (39th) | Ellen Burstyn | Barbara Jackson | Pack of Lies | CBS |
| 1987 (39th) | Lee Remick | Frances Schrueder | Nutcracker: Money, Madness and Murder | NBC |
| 1987 (39th) | Alfre Woodard | Maude DeVictor | Unnatural Causes | NBC |
1988 (40th)
| 1988 (40th) | Jessica Tandy | Annie Nations | Foxfire | CBS |
| 1988 (40th) | Ann Jillian | Herself | The Ann Jillian Story | NBC |
| 1988 (40th) | Mary Tyler Moore | Mary Todd Lincoln | Lincoln | NBC |
| 1988 (40th) | Mary Steenburgen | Miep Gies | The Attic: The Hiding of Anne Frank | CBS |
| 1988 (40th) | JoBeth Williams | Marybeth Whitehead | Baby M | ABC |
1989 (41st)
| 1989 (41st) | Holly Hunter | Ellen Russell | Roe vs. Wade | NBC |
| 1989 (41st) | Anjelica Huston | Clara Allen | Lonesome Dove | CBS |
| 1989 (41st) | Diane Lane | Lorena Wood | Lonesome Dove | CBS |
| 1989 (41st) | Amy Madigan | Sarah Weddington | Roe vs. Wade | NBC |
| 1989 (41st) | Jane Seymour | Natalie Henry | War and Remembrance | ABC |

=== 1990s ===
| Year | Actress | Role | Program | Network |
Outstanding Lead Actress in a Miniseries or Special
1990 (42nd)
| 1990 (42nd) | Barbara Hershey | Candy Morrison | A Killing in a Small Town | CBS |
| 1990 (42nd) | Farrah Fawcett | Diane Downs | Small Sacrifices | ABC |
| 1990 (42nd) | Christine Lahti | Zan Cooper | No Place Like Home | CBS |
| 1990 (42nd) | Annette O'Toole | Rose Kennedy | The Kennedys of Massachusetts | ABC |
| 1990 (42nd) | Lesley Ann Warren | Barbara Walker | Family of Spies | CBS |
| 1990 (42nd) | Alfre Woodard | Mary Thomas | A Mother's Courage: The Mary Thomas Story | NBC |
1991 (43rd)
| 1991 (43rd) | Lynn Whitfield | Josephine Baker | The Josephine Baker Story | HBO |
| 1991 (43rd) | Glenn Close | Sarah Wheaton | Sarah, Plain and Tall | CBS |
| 1991 (43rd) | Barbara Hershey | Hanna Trout | Paris Trout | Showtime |
| 1991 (43rd) | Suzanne Pleshette | Leona Helmsley | Leona Helmsley: The Queen of Mean | CBS |
| 1991 (43rd) | Lee Purcell | Bessie Robertson | Long Road Home | NBC |
1992 (44th)
| 1992 (44th) | Gena Rowlands | Pat Foster | Face of a Stranger | CBS |
| 1992 (44th) | Anne Bancroft | Mrs. Cage | Mrs. Cage | PBS |
| 1992 (44th) | Meredith Baxter | Betty Broderick | A Woman Scorned: The Betty Broderick Story | CBS |
| 1992 (44th) | Judy Davis | Mary Lindell | One Against the Wind | CBS |
| 1992 (44th) | Laura Dern | Janet Harduvel | Afterburn | HBO |
1993 (45th)
| 1993 (45th) | Holly Hunter | Wanda Holloway | The Positively True Adventures of the Alleged Texas Cheerleader-Murdering Mom | HBO |
| 1993 (45th) | Glenn Close | Sarah Wheaton | Skylark | CBS |
| 1993 (45th) | Helen Mirren | DCI Jane Tennison | Prime Suspect 2 | PBS |
| 1993 (45th) | Maggie Smith | Mrs. Venable | Suddenly, Last Summer | PBS |
| 1993 (45th) | Joanne Woodward | Nell Harrington | Blind Spot | CBS |
1994 (46th)
| 1994 (46th) | Kirstie Alley | Sally Goodson | David's Mother | CBS |
| 1994 (46th) | Bette Midler | Mama Rose | Gypsy | CBS |
| 1994 (46th) | Helen Mirren | DCI Jane Tennison | Prime Suspect 3 | PBS |
| 1994 (46th) | Jessica Tandy | Cora Peek | To Dance with the White Dog | CBS |
| 1994 (46th) | Joanne Woodward | Maggie Moran | Breathing Lessons | CBS |
1995 (47th)
| 1995 (47th) | Glenn Close | Margarethe Cammermeyer | Serving in Silence: The Margarethe Cammermeyer Story | NBC |
| 1995 (47th) | Sally Field | Bess Garner Steed | A Woman of Independent Means | NBC |
| 1995 (47th) | Anjelica Huston | Calamity Jane | Buffalo Girls | CBS |
| 1995 (47th) | Diane Keaton | Amelia Earhart | Amelia Earhart: The Final Flight | TNT |
| 1995 (47th) | Alfre Woodard | Berniece Charles | The Piano Lesson | CBS |
1996 (48th)
| 1996 (48th) | Helen Mirren | DCI Jane Tennison | Prime Suspect: Scent of Darkness | PBS |
| 1996 (48th) | Ashley Judd | Norma Jean Dougherty | Norma Jean & Marilyn | HBO |
| 1996 (48th) | Jessica Lange | Blanche DuBois | A Streetcar Named Desire | CBS |
| 1996 (48th) | Mira Sorvino | Marilyn Monroe | Norma Jean & Marilyn | HBO |
| 1996 (48th) | Sela Ward | Jessica Savitch | Almost Golden: The Jessica Savitch Story | Lifetime |
1997 (49th)
| 1997 (49th) | Alfre Woodard | Nurse Eunice Evers | Miss Evers' Boys | HBO |
| 1997 (49th) | Stockard Channing | Barbara Whitney | An Unexpected Family | USA |
| 1997 (49th) | Glenn Close | Janet | In the Gloaming | HBO |
| 1997 (49th) | Helen Mirren | DCI Jane Tennison | Prime Suspect 5: Errors of Judgement | PBS |
| 1997 (49th) | Meryl Streep | Lori Reimuller | ...First Do No Harm | ABC |
Outstanding Lead Actress in a Miniseries or Movie
1998 (50th)
| 1998 (50th) | Ellen Barkin | Glory Marie | Before Women Had Wings | ABC |
| 1998 (50th) | Jamie Lee Curtis | Maggie Green | Nicholas' Gift | CBS |
| 1998 (50th) | Judy Davis | Gladwyn | The Echo of Thunder | CBS |
| 1998 (50th) | Olympia Dukakis | Anna Madrigal | More Tales of the City | Showtime |
| 1998 (50th) | Angelina Jolie | Gia Carangi | Gia | HBO |
| 1998 (50th) | Sigourney Weaver | Claudia Hoffman | Snow White: A Tale of Terror | Showtime |
1999 (51st)
| 1999 (51st) | Helen Mirren | Ayn Rand | The Passion of Ayn Rand | Showtime |
| 1999 (51st) | Ann-Margret | Pamela Harriman | Life of the Party: The Pamela Harriman Story | Lifetime |
| 1999 (51st) | Stockard Channing | Rachel Luckman | The Baby Dance | Showtime |
| 1999 (51st) | Judy Davis | Lillian Hellman | Dash and Lilly | A&E |
| 1999 (51st) | Leelee Sobieski | Joan of Arc | Joan of Arc | CBS |

=== 2000s ===
| Year | Actress | Role | Program | Network |
Outstanding Lead Actress in a Miniseries or Movie
2000 (52nd)
| 2000 (52nd) | Halle Berry | Dorothy Dandridge | Introducing Dorothy Dandridge | HBO |
| 2000 (52nd) | Judy Davis | Paula Tanner | A Cooler Climate | Showtime |
| 2000 (52nd) | Sally Field | Iris Prue | A Cooler Climate | Showtime |
| 2000 (52nd) | Holly Hunter | Ruby Kincaid | Harlan County War | Showtime |
| 2000 (52nd) | Gena Rowlands | Georgia Porter | The Color of Love: Jacey's Story | CBS |
2001 (53rd)
| 2001 (53rd) | Judy Davis | Judy Garland | Life with Judy Garland: Me and My Shadows | ABC |
| 2001 (53rd) | Judi Dench | Elizabeth Harman | The Last of the Blonde Bombshells | HBO |
| 2001 (53rd) | Holly Hunter | Billie Jean King | When Billie Beat Bobby | ABC |
| 2001 (53rd) | Hannah Taylor-Gordon | Anne Frank | Anne Frank: The Whole Story | ABC |
| 2001 (53rd) | Emma Thompson | Vivian Bearing | Wit | HBO |
2002 (54th)
| 2002 (54th) | Laura Linney | Iris Bravard | Wild Iris | Showtime |
| 2002 (54th) | Angela Bassett | Rosa Parks | The Rosa Parks Story | CBS |
| 2002 (54th) | Blythe Danner | Corinne Mulvaney | We Were the Mulvaneys | Lifetime |
| 2002 (54th) | Vanessa Redgrave | Clementine Churchill | The Gathering Storm | HBO |
| 2002 (54th) | Gena Rowlands | Minnie Brinn | Wild Iris | Showtime |
2003 (55th)
| 2003 (55th) | Maggie Smith | Emily Delahunty | My House in Umbria | HBO |
| 2003 (55th) | Thora Birch | Liz Murray | Homeless to Harvard: The Liz Murray Story | Lifetime |
| 2003 (55th) | Helena Bonham Carter | Ingrid Formanek | Live from Baghdad | HBO |
| 2003 (55th) | Jessica Lange | Irma Applewood | Normal | HBO |
| 2003 (55th) | Helen Mirren | Karen Stone | The Roman Spring of Mrs. Stone | Showtime |
2004 (56th)
| 2004 (56th) | Meryl Streep | Hannah Pitt / Ethel Rosenberg / Rabbi Chemelwitz / The Angel Australia | Angels in America | HBO |
| 2004 (56th) | Glenn Close | Eleanor of Aquitaine | The Lion in Winter | Showtime |
| 2004 (56th) | Judy Davis | Nancy Reagan | The Reagans | Showtime |
| 2004 (56th) | Helen Mirren | DCI Jane Tennison | Prime Suspect 6: The Last Witness | PBS |
| 2004 (56th) | Emma Thompson | Nurse Emily / Homeless Woman / The Angel America | Angels in America | HBO |
2005 (57th)
| 2005 (57th) | S. Epatha Merkerson | Rachel "Nanny" Crosby | Lackawanna Blues | HBO |
| 2005 (57th) | Halle Berry | Janie Crawford | Their Eyes Were Watching God | ABC |
| 2005 (57th) | Blythe Danner | Rebecca Davitch | Back When We Were Grownups | CBS |
| 2005 (57th) | Cynthia Nixon | Eleanor Roosevelt | Warm Springs | HBO |
| 2005 (57th) | Debra Winger | Dawn Anna | Dawn Anna | Lifetime |
2006 (58th)
| 2006 (58th) | Helen Mirren | Queen Elizabeth I | Elizabeth I | HBO |
| 2006 (58th) | Gillian Anderson | Lady Dedlock | Bleak House | PBS |
| 2006 (58th) | Kathy Bates | Jane Stern | Ambulance Girl | Lifetime |
| 2006 (58th) | Annette Bening | Jean Harris | Mrs. Harris | HBO |
| 2006 (58th) | Judy Davis | Sante Kimes | A Little Thing Called Murder | Lifetime |
2007 (59th)
| 2007 (59th) | Helen Mirren | DCI Jane Tennison | Prime Suspect: The Final Act | PBS |
| 2007 (59th) | Queen Latifah | Ana Wallace | Life Support | HBO |
| 2007 (59th) | Debra Messing | Molly Kagan | The Starter Wife | USA |
| 2007 (59th) | Mary-Louise Parker | Zenia Arden | The Robber Bride | Oxygen |
| 2007 (59th) | Gena Rowlands | Melissa Eisenbloom | What If God Were the Sun? | Lifetime |
2008 (60th)
| 2008 (60th) | Laura Linney | Abigail Adams | John Adams | HBO |
| 2008 (60th) | Judi Dench | Miss Matty Jenkyns | Cranford | PBS |
| 2008 (60th) | Catherine Keener | Gertrude Baniszewski | An American Crime | Showtime |
| 2008 (60th) | Phylicia Rashad | Lena Younger | A Raisin in the Sun | ABC |
| 2008 (60th) | Susan Sarandon | Doris Duke | Bernard and Doris | HBO |
2009 (61st)
| 2009 (61st) | Jessica Lange | Edith "Big Edie" Beale | Grey Gardens | HBO |
| 2009 (61st) | Drew Barrymore | Edith "Little Edie" Beale | Grey Gardens | HBO |
| 2009 (61st) | Shirley MacLaine | Coco Chanel | Coco Chanel | Lifetime |
| 2009 (61st) | Sigourney Weaver | Mary Griffith | Prayers for Bobby | Lifetime |
| 2009 (61st) | Chandra Wilson | Yvonne Caldwell | Accidental Friendship | Hallmark |

=== 2010s ===
| Year | Actress | Role | Program | Network |
Outstanding Lead Actress in a Miniseries or Movie
2010 (62nd)
| 2010 (62nd) | Claire Danes | Temple Grandin | Temple Grandin | HBO |
| 2010 (62nd) | Joan Allen | Georgia O'Keeffe | Georgia O'Keeffe | Lifetime |
| 2010 (62nd) | Hope Davis | Hillary Clinton | The Special Relationship | HBO |
| 2010 (62nd) | Judi Dench | Matty Jenkyns | Return to Cranford | PBS |
| 2010 (62nd) | Maggie Smith | Mary Gilbert | Capturing Mary | HBO |
2011 (63rd)
| 2011 (63rd) | Kate Winslet | Mildred Pierce | Mildred Pierce | HBO |
| 2011 (63rd) | Taraji P. Henson | Tiffany Rubin | Taken from Me: The Tiffany Rubin Story | Lifetime |
| 2011 (63rd) | Diane Lane | Pat Loud | Cinema Verite | HBO |
| 2011 (63rd) | Jean Marsh | Rose Buck | Upstairs, Downstairs | PBS |
| 2011 (63rd) | Elizabeth McGovern | Cora, Countess of Grantham | Downton Abbey | PBS |
2012 (64th)
| 2012 (64th) | Julianne Moore | Sarah Palin | Game Change | HBO |
| 2012 (64th) | Connie Britton | Vivien Harmon | American Horror Story | FX |
| 2012 (64th) | Ashley Judd | Rebecca Winstone | Missing | ABC |
| 2012 (64th) | Nicole Kidman | Martha Gellhorn | Hemingway & Gellhorn | HBO |
| 2012 (64th) | Emma Thompson | She | The Song of Lunch | PBS |
2013 (65th)
| 2013 (65th) | Laura Linney | Cathy Jamison | The Big C: Hereafter | Showtime |
| 2013 (65th) | Jessica Lange | Sister Jude Martin | American Horror Story: Asylum | FX |
| 2013 (65th) | Helen Mirren | Linda Kenney Baden | Phil Spector | HBO |
| 2013 (65th) | Elisabeth Moss | Det. Robin Griffin | Top of the Lake | Sundance |
| 2013 (65th) | Sigourney Weaver | Elaine Barrish | Political Animals | USA |
2014 (66th)
| 2014 (66th) | Jessica Lange | Fiona Goode | American Horror Story: Coven | FX |
| 2014 (66th) | Helena Bonham Carter | Elizabeth Taylor | Burton & Taylor | BBC America |
| 2014 (66th) | Minnie Driver | Maggie Royal | Return to Zero | Lifetime |
| 2014 (66th) | Sarah Paulson | Cordelia Foxx | American Horror Story: Coven | FX |
| 2014 (66th) | Cicely Tyson | Carrie Watts | The Trip to Bountiful | Lifetime |
| 2014 (66th) | Kristen Wiig | Cynthia Morehouse | The Spoils of Babylon | IFC |
Outstanding Lead Actress in a Limited Series or Movie
2015 (67th)
| 2015 (67th) | Frances McDormand | Olive Kitteridge | Olive Kitteridge | HBO |
| 2015 (67th) | Maggie Gyllenhaal | Nessa Stein | The Honorable Woman | Sundance |
| 2015 (67th) | Felicity Huffman | Barbara Hanlon | American Crime | ABC |
| 2015 (67th) | Jessica Lange | Elsa Mars | American Horror Story: Freak Show | FX |
| 2015 (67th) | Queen Latifah | Bessie Smith | Bessie | HBO |
| 2015 (67th) | Emma Thompson | Mrs. Lovett | Sweeney Todd: The Demon Barber of Fleet Street (Live from Lincoln Center) | PBS |
2016 (68th)
| 2016 (68th) | Sarah Paulson | Marcia Clark | The People v. O. J. Simpson: American Crime Story | FX |
| 2016 (68th) | Kirsten Dunst | Peggy Blumquist | Fargo | FX |
| 2016 (68th) | Felicity Huffman | Leslie Graham | American Crime | ABC |
| 2016 (68th) | Audra McDonald | Billie Holiday | Lady Day at Emerson's Bar and Grill | HBO |
| 2016 (68th) | Lili Taylor | Anne Blaine | American Crime | ABC |
| 2016 (68th) | Kerry Washington | Anita Hill | Confirmation | HBO |
| 2017 (69th) | Nicole Kidman | Celeste Wright | Big Little Lies | HBO |
| 2017 (69th) | Carrie Coon | Gloria Burgle | Fargo | FX |
| 2017 (69th) | Felicity Huffman | Jeanette Hesby | American Crime | ABC |
| 2017 (69th) | Jessica Lange | Joan Crawford | Feud: Bette and Joan | FX |
| 2017 (69th) | Susan Sarandon | Bette Davis | Feud: Bette and Joan | FX |
| 2017 (69th) | Reese Witherspoon | Madeline Martha McKenzie | Big Little Lies | HBO |
2018 (70th)
| 2018 (70th) | Regina King | Latrice Butler | Seven Seconds | Netflix |
| 2018 (70th) | Jessica Biel | Cora Tannetti | The Sinner | USA |
| 2018 (70th) | Laura Dern | Jennifer Fox | The Tale | HBO |
| 2018 (70th) | Michelle Dockery | Alice Fletcher | Godless | Netflix |
| 2018 (70th) | Edie Falco | Leslie Abramson | Law & Order True Crime: The Menendez Murders | NBC |
| 2018 (70th) | Sarah Paulson | Ally Mayfair-Richards | American Horror Story: Cult | FX |
2019 (71st)
| 2019 (71st) | Michelle Williams | Gwen Verdon | Fosse/Verdon | FX |
| 2019 (71st) | Amy Adams | Camille Preaker | Sharp Objects | HBO |
| 2019 (71st) | Patricia Arquette | Joyce "Tilly" Mitchell | Escape at Dannemora | Showtime |
| 2019 (71st) | Aunjanue Ellis-Taylor | Sharonne Salaam | When They See Us | Netflix |
| 2019 (71st) | Joey King | Gypsy Rose Blanchard | The Act | Hulu |
| 2019 (71st) | Niecy Nash | Delores Wise | When They See Us | Netflix |

=== 2020s ===
| Year | Actress | Role | Program | Network |
Outstanding Lead Actress in a Limited Series or Movie
2020 (72nd)
| 2020 (72nd) | Regina King | Angela Abar / Sister Night | Watchmen | HBO |
| 2020 (72nd) | Cate Blanchett | Phyllis Schlafly | Mrs. America | FX |
| 2020 (72nd) | Shira Haas | Esther "Esty" Shapiro | Unorthodox | Netflix |
| 2020 (72nd) | Octavia Spencer | Madam C. J. Walker | Self Made | Netflix |
| 2020 (72nd) | Kerry Washington | Mia Warren | Little Fires Everywhere | Hulu |
Outstanding Lead Actress in a Limited or Anthology Series or Movie
2021 (73rd)
| 2021 (73rd) | Kate Winslet | Mare Sheehan | Mare of Easttown | HBO |
| 2021 (73rd) | Michaela Coel | Arabella Essiedu | I May Destroy You | HBO |
| 2021 (73rd) | Cynthia Erivo | Aretha Franklin | Genius: Aretha | Nat Geo |
| 2021 (73rd) | Elizabeth Olsen | Wanda Maximoff | WandaVision | Disney+ |
| 2021 (73rd) | Anya Taylor-Joy | Beth Harmon | The Queen's Gambit | Netflix |
2022 (74th)
| 2022 (74th) | Amanda Seyfried | Elizabeth Holmes | The Dropout | Hulu |
| 2022 (74th) | Toni Collette | Kathleen Peterson | The Staircase | HBO Max |
| 2022 (74th) | Julia Garner | Anna Delvey | Inventing Anna | Netflix |
| 2022 (74th) | Lily James | Pamela Anderson | Pam & Tommy | Hulu |
| 2022 (74th) | Sarah Paulson | Linda Tripp | Impeachment: American Crime Story | FX |
| 2022 (74th) | Margaret Qualley | Alex Russell | Maid | Netflix |
2023 (75th)
| 2023 (75th) | Ali Wong | Amy Lau | Beef | Netflix |
| 2023 (75th) | Lizzy Caplan | Libby | Fleishman Is in Trouble | FX |
| 2023 (75th) | Jessica Chastain | Tammy Wynette | George & Tammy | Showtime |
| 2023 (75th) | Dominique Fishback | Andrea "Dre" Greene | Swarm | Prime |
| 2023 (75th) | Kathryn Hahn | Clare Pierce | Tiny Beautiful Things | Hulu |
| 2023 (75th) | Riley Keough | Daisy Jones | Daisy Jones & the Six | Prime |
2024 (76th)
| 2024 (76th) | Jodie Foster | Chief Liz Danvers | True Detective: Night Country | HBO |
| 2024 (76th) | Brie Larson | Elizabeth Zott | Lessons in Chemistry | Apple TV+ |
| 2024 (76th) | Juno Temple | Dorothy "Dot" Lyon | Fargo | FX |
| 2024 (76th) | Sofía Vergara | Griselda Blanco | Griselda | Netflix |
| 2024 (76th) | Naomi Watts | Babe Paley | Feud: Capote vs. The Swans | FX |
2025 (77th)
| 2025 (77th) | Cristin Milioti | Sofia Falcone | The Penguin | HBO |
| 2025 (77th) | Cate Blanchett | Catherine Ravenscroft | Disclaimer | Apple TV+ |
| 2025 (77th) | Meghann Fahy | Devon DeWitt | Sirens | Netflix |
| 2025 (77th) | Rashida Jones | Amanda Waters | Black Mirror (episode: "Common People") | Netflix |
| 2025 (77th) | Michelle Williams | Molly Kochan | Dying for Sex | FX |
2026 (78th)
| 2026 (78th) | Sally Field | Tova Sullivan | Remarkably Bright Creatures | Netflix |
| 2026 (78th) | Claire Danes | Aggie Wiggs | The Beast in Me | Netflix |
| 2026 (78th) | Carey Mulligan | Lindsay Crane-Martín | Beef | Netflix |
| 2026 (78th) | Sarah Pidgeon | Carolyn Bessette | Love Story: John F. Kennedy Jr. & Carolyn Bessette | FX |
| 2026 (78th) | Sarah Snook | Marissa Irvine | All Her Fault | Peacock |

== Superlatives ==
| Superlative | Outstanding Lead Actress in a Limited Series or Movie |
|---|---|
| Actress with most awards | Helen Mirren (4) |
| Actress with most nominations | Helen Mirren (10) |
| Actress with most nominations without ever winning | Helen Hayes (5), Lee Remick (5) |

== Programs with multiple wins ==
5 wins

- Hallmark Hall of Fame

2 wins

- Bob Hope Presents the Chrysler Theatre
- Prime Suspect
- Producers' Showcase

== Performers with multiple wins ==
4 wins

- Helen Mirren (2 consecutive)

3 wins

- Patty Duke
- Laura Linney

2 wins

- Judith Anderson
- Ingrid Bergman
- Sally Field
- Julie Harris
- Holly Hunter
- Regina King
- Jessica Lange
- Geraldine Page
- Gena Rowlands
- Meryl Streep
- Kate Winslet
- Joanne Woodward

== Programs with multiple nominations ==
9 nominations

- Hallmark Hall of Fame

6 nominations

- American Horror Story
- Prime Suspect

5 nominations

- Playhouse 90

4 nominations

- American Crime

3 nominations

- Bob Hope Presents the Chrysler Theatre
- Fargo
- Feud
- The United States Steel Hour

2 nominations

- American Crime Story
- Angels in America
- Beef
- Big Little Lies
- Captains and the Kings
- CBS Playhouse
- Climax!
- A Cooler Climate
- Dr. Kildare*
- Elizabeth R
- Grey Gardens
- Holocaust
- Lonesome Dove
- Lux Video Theater
- The Miracle Worker
- Norma Jean & Marilyn
- The Richard Boone Show
- Roe vs. Wade
- The Snoop Sisters
- Studio One
- Sybil
- When They See Us
- Wild Iris

== Performers with multiple nominations ==
10 nominations

- Helen Mirren

7 nominations

- Judy Davis
- Jessica Lange

6 nominations

- Glenn Close
- Julie Harris
- Gena Rowlands
- Joanne Woodward

5 nominations

- Helen Hayes
- Lee Remick

4 nominations

- Jane Alexander
- Judith Anderson
- Ann-Margret
- Sally Field
- Katharine Hepburn
- Holly Hunter
- Elizabeth Montgomery
- Sarah Paulson
- Eva Marie Saint
- Maureen Stapleton
- Emma Thompson
- Cicely Tyson
- Alfre Woodard

3 nominations

- Ingrid Bergman
- Judi Dench
- Colleen Dewhurst
- Patty Duke
- Lee Grant
- Felicity Huffman
- Glenda Jackson
- Laura Linney
- Mary Tyler Moore
- Geraldine Page
- Vanessa Redgrave
- Maggie Smith
- Meryl Streep
- Jessica Tandy
- Sigourney Weaver

2 nominations

- Halle Berry
- Cate Blanchett
- Helena Bonham Carter
- Carol Burnett
- Ellen Burstyn
- Stockard Channing
- Susan Clark
- Claire Danes
- Laura Dern
- Blythe Danner
- Bette Davis
- Farrah Fawcett
- Lynn Fontanne
- Rosemary Harris
- Barbara Hershey
- Anjelica Huston
- Ann Jillian
- Ashley Judd
- Nicole Kidman
- Regina King
- Diane Lane
- Piper Laurie
- Cloris Leachman
- Jean Marsh
- Suzanne Pleshette
- Queen Latifah
- Susan Sarandon
- Jane Seymour
- Sada Thompson
- Claire Trevor
- Kerry Washington
- JoBeth Williams
- Michelle Williams
- Kate Winslet
- Shelley Winters
- Teresa Wright

== See also ==
- Actor Award for Outstanding Performance by a Female Actor in a Miniseries or Television Movie
- Best Actress
- Critics' Choice Television Award for Best Actress in a Movie/Miniseries
- Golden Globe Award for Best Actress – Miniseries or Television Film
- List of acting awards
- List of television awards for Best Actress
- Primetime Emmy Award for Outstanding Lead Actor in a Comedy Series
- Primetime Emmy Award for Outstanding Lead Actress in a Comedy Series
- Primetime Emmy Award for Outstanding Supporting Actor in a Comedy Series
- Primetime Emmy Award for Outstanding Supporting Actress in a Comedy Series
- Primetime Emmy Award for Outstanding Lead Actor in a Drama Series
- Primetime Emmy Award for Outstanding Lead Actress in a Drama Series
- Primetime Emmy Award for Outstanding Supporting Actor in a Drama Series
- Primetime Emmy Award for Outstanding Supporting Actress in a Drama Series
- Primetime Emmy Award for Outstanding Lead Actor in a Limited or Anthology Series or Movie
- Primetime Emmy Award for Outstanding Supporting Actor in a Limited or Anthology Series or Movie
- Primetime Emmy Award for Outstanding Supporting Actress in a Limited or Anthology Series or Movie
- TCA Award for Individual Achievement in Drama
