= Tell Me Everything =

Tell Me Everything may refer to:

- Tell Me Everything (album), a 2008 album by Ernst Reijseger
- Tell Me Everything (TV series), an ITV2 teen drama series
- Tell Me Everything (film), a 2026 film by Moshe Rosenthal
- Tell Me Everything: The Story of a Private Investigation, a 2022 book by Erika Krouse
- Tell Me Everything: A Memoir, a 2023 memoir by American actress Minka Kelly
- Tell Me Everything (novel), a 2024 novel by Elizabeth Strout
