= Short-story cycle =

Collection of short stories

A short-story cycle (sometimes referred to as a story sequence or composite novel) is a collection of short stories in which the narratives are specifically composed and arranged with the goal of creating an enhanced or different experience when reading the group as a whole as opposed to its individual parts. Short-story cycles are different from novels because the parts that would make up the chapters can all stand alone as short stories, each individually containing a beginning, middle and conclusion. When read as a group there is a tension created between the ideas of the individual stories, often showing changes that have occurred over time or highlighting the conflict between two opposing concepts or thoughts. Because of this dynamic, the stories need to have an awareness of what the other stories accomplish; therefore, cycles are usually written with the express purpose of creating a cycle as opposed to being gathered and arranged later.

== Definitional debates ==
Scholars have pointed out that there is a wide range of possibilities that fall between simple collections and novels in their most-commonly understood form. One question is how well the stories stand up individually: chapters of a novel usually cannot stand alone, whereas stories in collections are meant to be fully independent. But many books have combined stories in such a way that the stories have varying degrees of interdependence, and it is these variations that cause problems in definition. Maggie Dunn and Ann Morris, for instance, claim that the stories in a story cycle are more independent than those in a composite novel, and James Nagel points out that both cycle and sequence are misleading, since cycle implies circularity and sequence implies temporal linearity, neither of which he finds to be essential to most such collections. Rolf Lundén has suggested four types of cycles, in order of decreasing unity: the cycle, in which the ending resolves the conflicts brought up at the beginning (e.g., The Bridge of San Luis Rey); the sequence, in which each story is linked to the ones before it but without a cumulative story that ties everything together (e.g., The Unvanquished); the cluster, in which the links between stories are not always made obvious and in which the discontinuity between them is more significant than their unity (e.g., Go Down, Moses); and the novella, in the classical sense of a collection of unrelated stories brought together by a frame story and a narrator(s) (e.g., Winesburg, Ohio). [All examples are Lundén's.] Robert M. Luscher compares and contrasts the short-story cycle and science fiction short stories combined into longer fixups.

== History ==
In their study of the genre, Maggie Dunn and Ann Morris note that the form descends from two different traditions: There are texts that are themselves assembled from other texts, such as the way the tales from the Arthurian cycle are compiled in books by Chretien de Troyes, Wolfram von Eschenbach, Thomas Malory and the Mabinogion. Then there are the classic serialized novellas, many of them with frame stories; this genre includes One Thousand and One Nights, The Decameron, The Canterbury Tales, etc. Dunn and Morris show how in the nineteenth century, the genre appeared in such forms as the village sketch collection (e.g., Our Village) and the patchwork collection (e.g., Louisa May Alcott's Aunt Jo's Scrap-Bag).

J. Gerald Kennedy describes the proliferation of the genre in the twentieth century, attributing it in part to the desire "to renounce the organizing authority of an omniscient narrator, asserting instead a variety of voices or perspectives reflective of the radical subjectivity of modern experience. Kennedy finds this proliferation in keeping with modernism and its use of fragmentation, juxtaposition and simultaneism to reflect the "multiplicity" that he believed to characterize that century. Scholars such as James Nagel and Rocío G. Davis have pointed out that the story cycle has been very popular among ethnic U.S. authors. Davis argues that ethnic writers find the format useful "as a metaphor for the fragmentation and multiplicity of ethnic lives" insofar as it highlights "the subjectivity of experience and understanding" by allowing "multiple impressionistic perspectives and fragmentation of simple linear history".

== The composite novel ==
Dunn and Morris list several methods that authors use to provide unity to the collection as a whole. These organising principles pertain to their theory of the composite novel as a short story collection where the focus lies on the coherent whole. (the examples are theirs): The organising principles

- a geographical area: The Country of the Pointed Firs, Dubliners, The Women of Brewster Place, The Pastures of Heaven
- a central protagonist, which has the option of also being the narrator: Cosmicomics, Winesburg, Ohio, The Woman Warrior, A Certain Lucas
- a collective protagonist: In Our Time, Go Down, Moses, Love Medicine, Borderlands/La Frontera: The New Mestiza
- patterns to create coherence: Three Lives, Exile and the Kingdom, The Golden Apples, A Yellow Raft in Blue Water
- focus on storytelling itself: The Way to Rainy Mountain, Pricksongs & Descants, How to Make an American Quilt

Multiple of these organizing principles may be used to create a composite novel.

== Titles using cycle technique ==
- Annie John
- Ashenden: Or the British Agent
- Black Swan Green
- Bad Haircut
- The Candy House
- Cane
- Cathedral
- The Conjure Woman
- The Country of the Pointed Firs
- Dark Avenues
- Dubliners
- The Finer Grain
- For Colored Girls Who Have Considered Suicide When the Rainbow Is Enuf
- Go Down, Moses
- The Golovlyov Family
- A Good Scent from a Strange Mountain
- Hearts in Atlantis
- A Hero of Our Time
- The House on Mango Street
- The Housebreaker of Shady Hill and Other Stories
- "How High We Go in the Dark"
- How the García Girls Lost Their Accents
- I, Robot
- In Our Time
- Jesus' Son
- The Joy Luck Club
- The Last of the Menu Girls
- Legends of the Province House
- Linmill Stories
- Lives of Girls and Women
- Love Medicine
- The Martian Chronicles
- Monkeys
- Mrs. Spring Fragrance
- Old Creole Days
- Olinger Stories
- Olive, Again
- Olive Kitteridge
- The Piazza Tales
- Pictures of Fidelman
- Red Cavalry
- Sinbad the Sailor
- The Seven Wonders
- The Sketch Book of Geoffrey Crayon, Gent.
- A Sportsman's Sketches
- The Street of Crocodiles
- The Things They Carried
- Three Lives
- Three Tales
- Uncle Tom's Children
- Until the Victim Becomes our Own
- A Visit from the Goon Squad
- The Watsons Go to Birmingham – 1963
- The Wide Net
- Winesburg, Ohio
- The Women of Brewster Place
- A Young Doctor's Notebook
