= Oh William! =

2021 novel by Elizabeth Strout

- First edition
- Author: Elizabeth Strout
- Language: English
- Series: Lucy Barton
- Set in: New York City
- Published: 2021
- Publisher: Random House
- Publication date: October 19, 2021
- Publication place: United States
- Media type: Print, e-book, audiobook
- ISBN: 9780812989434
- Preceded by: My Name Is Lucy Barton, Anything is Possible
- Followed by: Lucy by the Sea

Oh William! is a novel by American writer Elizabeth Strout, published on October 19, 2021, by Random House. The novel focuses on a now successful, middle-age writer, Lucy Barton, whose earlier life was at the center of Strout's novels My Name Is Lucy Barton (2016) and Anything Is Possible (2017). It deals in particular with her relationship to her ex-husband, William, with whom she has two adult daughters. While he is now in his third marriage, Lucy has been recently widowed after a happy second marriage. The novel also explores William's family history and reveals unexpected details about his now deceased mother and father. The story of how these findings impact their later lives will be continued in the fourth novel in the series, Lucy by the Sea (2022).

The book was a New York Times and IndieBound best seller. It was shortlisted for the 2022 Booker Prize which was announced on September 6, 2022.

== Reception ==
Oh William! was a New York Times and IndieBound best seller and received positive reviews from various outlets.

Booklist provided Oh William! a starred review and called it "a masterful, wise, moving, and ultimately uplifting meditation on human existence." Publishers Weekly also provided a starred review.

Pankaj Mishra of The New York Review of Books complimented Strout's prose, stating her "unshowy, sparing of metaphor ... vivid with both necessary and contingent detail, matches her democracy of subject and theme, and seems agile enough to describe any human situation." The Los Angeles Times mirrored the sentiment, stating, "Strout doesn’t dress language up in a tuxedo when a wool sweater will suffice. Other novelists must berate themselves when they see what Strout pulls off without any tacky pyrotechnics. Straightforward goes down so easy and feels so refreshing."

Speaking of Strout's strengths in creating natural dialogue, The New York Times Book Review's Jennifer Egan stated: "One proof of Elizabeth Strout’s greatness is the sleight of hand with which she injects sneaky subterranean power into seemingly transparent prose. Strout works in the realm of everyday speech, conjuring repetitions, gaps and awkwardness with plain language and forthright diction, yet at the same time unleashing a tidal urgency that seems to come out of nowhere even as it operates in plain sight."

The Financial Times noted that "What sets Strout’s work apart is her characterisation." Library Journal expanded on the sentiment, stating that Strout's characters are "so developed, so human and flawed, that readers might feel frustrated with them, as one would with a friend or family member." The Spectator continues, stating that Strout's use of "you" throughout the story asks the reader "to reassess every single relationship they’ve ever had: with their partner, their parents, their children and themselves, while they can still do something about it."

The Wall Street Journal claimed that "Elizabeth Strout’s Lucy Barton novels, of which Oh William! is the latest, have become essential to the contemporary canon."

Oh William! also received positive reviews from The Boston Globe, NPR, The Washington Post, The Sunday Times, The Guardian, The Irish Times, The Scotsman, I News, Associated Press, and The Times Literary Supplement.

Contrary to the above, Connie Ogle of The Star Tribune noted that "While it's always a pleasure to read Strout's restrained but lovely prose and skillful character sketches, Oh William! lacks the urgency and affecting, understated power of the original novel." The San Francisco Chronicle's Alexis Burling echoed the sentiment, stating that the book is a "welcome return to form (if you liked 2016’s somewhat claustrophobic My Name Is Lucy Barton and are able to gloss over Strout’s habit of rehashing some of the old plotlines in this one, that is)."

Maureen Corrigan, The New York Times Book Review, The Washington Post, TIME, BBC, and Vulture named it one of the best books of the year.

Oh William! was also a nominee for the Goodreads Choice Award for Fiction (2021). The novel was named on the longlist and shortlist for the 2022 Booker Prize (Strout having been previously nominated for the Booker Prize in 2016 with My Name Is Lucy Barton).
