= Amy and Isabelle =

1998 debut novel by the American author Elizabeth Strout

- First edition US hardback cover
- Author: Elizabeth Strout
- Audio read by: Stephanie Roberts
- Language: English
- Published: 1998
- Publisher: Random House
- Publication place: United States
- Media type: Print, ebook, audiobook
- Pages: 303 pages
- ISBN: 0375501347
- Preceded by: Abide with Me

Amy and Isabelle, also stylized as Amy & Isabelle, is the 1998 debut novel by the American author Elizabeth Strout. The novel was first published in hardback on December 29, 1998 through Random House and is set in the fictional town of Shirley Falls, a location that Strout would revisit in her 2013 novel The Burgess Boys. Strout would also revisit the character of Isabelle in her 2019 short story cycle Olive, Again.

The novel follows the close relationship between Isabelle and her teenage daughter Amy, and how their relationship becomes strained after Amy is groomed by her much older math teacher.

The novel was adapted into a 2001 television movie of the same name as part of the "Oprah Winfrey Presents" line of films.

== Synopsis ==
When she is 16 years old, Amy goes to work at her mother's office, working in the office part of a mill in Shirley Falls. The two had previously had a close relationship, but their current relationship is strained and Amy is disdainful of her mother, who she sees as an awkward outsider.

A year previously Amy's math teacher was replaced by a substitute, Mr. Robertson. Amy becomes attracted to him after he singles her out for her beautiful gold curly hair and tells her that she looks like a poet. After maneuvering her way into detention with him the two begin to spend time with one another after school, eventually progressing to Mr. Robertson driving Amy home and eventually kissing her.

Isabelle meanwhile begins to sense that her daughter is ashamed of her as she never graduated from college. She begins to try to self improve by reading.

Meanwhile, the physical relationship between Amy and her older math teacher, Mr. Robertson progresses. They are eventually caught by Avery Clark, Isabelle's boss, who finds a nude Amy and Mr. Robertson in the car and informs Isabelle what he has seen. Isabelle feels angry at Mr. Robertson, but is also jealous of her daughter for having a sexual relationship. She persuades Mr. Robertson to leave by threatening to report him to the police as Amy is underage. Returning home she cuts off Amy's hair in a fit of rage, causing a rift between mother and daughter.

Amy goes to work in the mill and the mother-daughter duo outwardly pretend that nothing has changed in their relationship. However the incident causes Isabelle to reflect back on the circumstances of Amy's birth as she was groomed into a sexual relationship as a teenager by the married friend of her deceased father. Isabelle has conflicting feelings about the relationship as it was the last time she was sexually intimate with a man, but also the ensuing pregnancy derailed her plans to become a teacher. Her uncertainty and loneliness cause her to reach out to her coworkers and begin to bond with some of them.

When one of Isabelle's coworkers discovers her husband is leaving her for another woman, Isabelle allows her to spend the night at her home. The same night Amy and her friend's ex-boyfriend accidentally discover the body of a young girl who had gone missing months earlier. Distressed Amy tracks down Mr. Robertson and is horrified that he refuses to acknowledge her. The two incidents cause Isabelle to confide in her friends about the circumstances of Amy's birth and her guilt over having had an affair with an older married man. Isabelle's friends encourage her to reveal the truth to Amy.

Isabelle does finally tell Amy about her father and to her surprise Amy is excited by the fact that she has three paternal siblings. Isabelle reaches out to them on Amy's behalf and learns that after the death of their father the family is now ready to accept Amy. Both mother and daughter go to meet Amy's new family. While Amy is excited, Isabelle feels that Amy is no longer "her" daughter and now belongs to other people allowing her to consider what living for and by herself will be like.

== Television adaptation ==
In 2000 it was announced that Oprah Winfrey had acquired the rights to the work, with the intent to make a film through Harpo Productions, under their "Oprah Winfrey Presents" banner. Filming took place in South Carolina and Elisabeth Shue and Hanna Hall were brought on to portray Isabelle and Amy Goodrow. The film aired on ABC on March 4, 2001. Critical reception for the film was mixed.

== Reception ==
Critical reception for the novel has been positive and the book received praise from Entertainment Weekly and Publishers Weekly. Author Suzanne Berne reviewed the book for the New York Times and commented that although the book was not perfect, it was "such an eloquent, captivating novel that its occasional missteps don't much signify. By focusing on the ''confluence of different longings'' that bedevils her characters into harming and helping one another, Strout makes the drab little world of Shirley Falls seem richly important."

The novel won the 1999 Art Seidenbaum Award for First Fiction.
