= Abide with Me (disambiguation) =

Abide with Me is a Christian hymn composed by Henry Francis Lyte in 1847.

Abide with Me may also refer to:

- Abide with Me (novel), 2006, by Elizabeth Strout
- Abide with Me (play), 1935, by Clare Boothe Luce
- A television drama based on A Child in the Forest by Winifred Foley

== See also ==
- "Abide with Me, 'Tis Eventide", an American Christian hymn written by Martin Lowrie Hofford and Harrison Millard in 1870
- I Abide with Me, a 1914 movie directed by Joseph Franz
