= Minka Kelly =

American actress and author (born 1980)

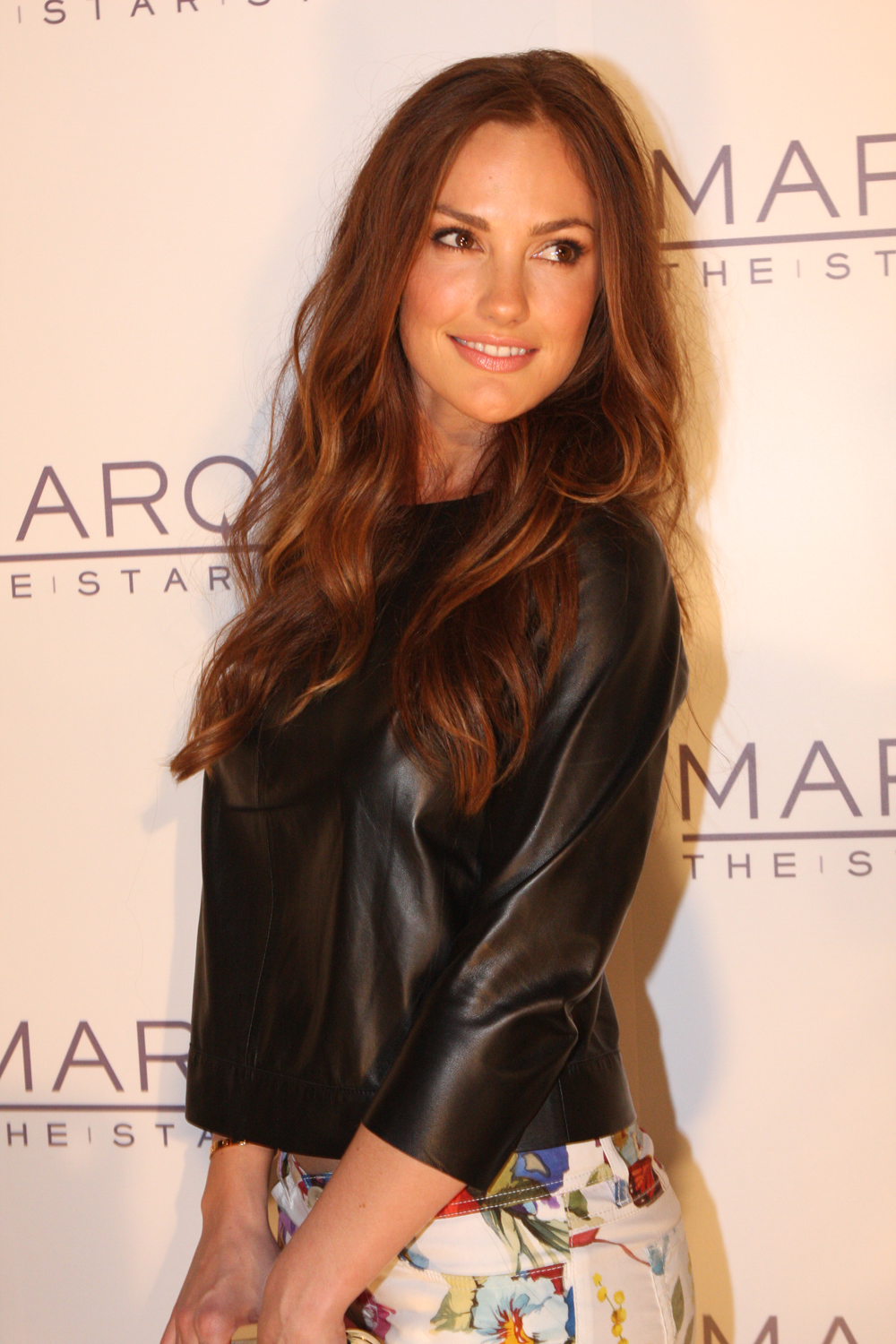
- Kelly in 2012
- Born: June 24, 1980 (age 46); Los Angeles, California, U.S.
- Occupation: Actress • author
- Years active: 2002–present
- Notable work: Friday Night Lights; Parenthood; Euphoria; Ransom Canyon

Minka Dumont Kelly (born June 24, 1980) is an American actress. She received wide recognition for her role as Lyla Garrity on the NBC drama series Friday Night Lights (2006–2009). Kelly appeared as Autumn in the film 500 Days of Summer (2009). She had a recurring role as Gaby on the NBC family drama series Parenthood (2010–2011). She was in the ABC action series revival of Charlie's Angels (2011). She starred in the films The Roommate and Searching for Sonny (2011). Kelly is one of few actresses who portrayed First Lady of the U.S., Jackie Kennedy, in Lee Daniels's The Butler alongside Oprah Winfrey (2013). Kelly played Dawn Granger / Dove in the DC Universe series Titans on HBO Max (2018–2021). Kelly appeared in the recurring role of Samantha in the HBO drama series Euphoria (2022). Kelly stars in the Netflix western romance drama series Ransom Canyon (2025–2026).

In 2023, Kelly also authored a memoir, Tell Me Everything, which became a New York Times Best Seller. She narrated it herself for Audible, which awarded it "Best Celebrity Memoir of 2023". The Washington Post awarded it "Best Memoir of 2023", and it became a Goodreads Choice Award nominee for "Best Memoir & Autobiography".

== Early life ==
Kelly was born in Los Angeles. She is the only child of Maureen Dumont Kelly and former Aerosmith guitarist Rick Dufay. Dufay was born in Paris, France. From both her parents, she has French, Irish, and Dutch-Indonesian ancestry. She was raised primarily by her mother and her mother's on-and-off boyfriend David Gonzalez.

Her mother worked various jobs, including as a stripper and bartender, and often struggled to make ends meet throughout Kelly's childhood. At one point, they lived in a storage shed at an apartment complex after losing their apartment unit. To earn extra money, her mother tried to smuggle drugs across the Mexico–United States border, but was caught and jailed for a period of time. While her mother was incarcerated, Kelly was sent to live in the homes of various friends and acquaintances of her mother. In one home, Kelly was physically abused.

Before Kelly began junior high school, she and her mother relocated to Albuquerque, New Mexico, to be near the extended family of her father figure, David Gonzalez. When she was 16, her mother and Gonzalez fled New Mexico in an attempt to escape drug charges. Kelly moved in with a boyfriend who was five years her senior and had an abortion at 17. She attended two high schools, before graduating from Valley High School in Albuquerque, New Mexico.

After graduation, Kelly reconnected with her biological father and moved to Los Angeles to live with him. Kelly held various jobs, working in sales for VoiceStream wireless (T-Mobile) and then AT&T. While in Los Angeles she wanted to pursue acting as a hobby while she went to school to become a surgical technician. Kelly's mother Maureen died in 2008, at age 51, from colon cancer.

Kelly was able to find work as a receptionist at a surgeon's office; her exposure to the medical field spurred her to attend surgical technology school for a year studying, allowing her to become a surgical technician where she assisted surgeons in the operating room. During the four years she spent in the vocation she continued auditioning for film and television roles and appeared in commercials for Old Navy and Clearasil. However, after her first acting class, she got hooked and began pursuing acting as a career.

== Career ==
=== 2002–2005: Career beginnings ===
In 2003, Kelly made her acting debut in the short film The Turbo Charged Prelude for 2 Fast 2 Furious alongside Paul Walker, a six-minute prequel to the action film 2 Fast 2 Furious. This was followed by a special guest appearance on Cracking Up. She has since appeared in a number of television shows such as Entourage, Drake & Josh, and American Dreams. In 2005, Kelly landed a three-episode recurring role in The WB comedy series What I Like About You.

=== 2006–2010: Breakthrough with Friday Night Lights ===
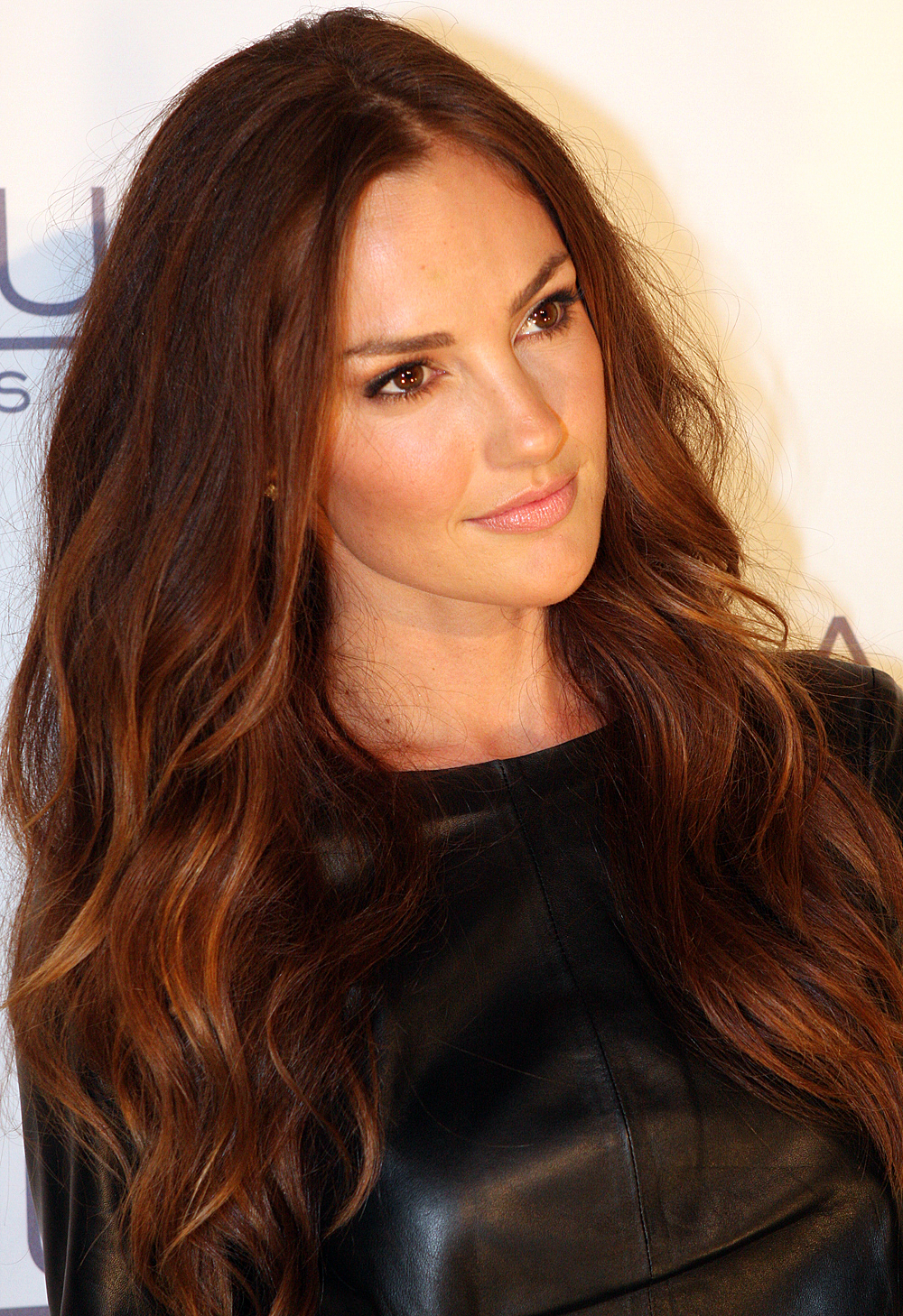
Kelly in 2012

In April 2006, Kelly was cast as a series regular on the Emmy nominated NBC drama series Friday Night Lights. The show was based on the high school football film of the same name; it follows a high school football team in the fictional small town of Dillon. Kelly played the role of high school student and cheerleader Lyla Garrity. The series premiered on October 3, 2006, with Kelly receiving praise for her performance with The New York Times calling her performance "heartbreaking." In preparation for her role as a cheerleader she trained with the Pflugerville High School cheerleading squad. At the end of the show's third season Kelly left the series as her character left for college.

In 2006, Kelly starred in the horror slasher film The Pumpkin Karver as Tammy Boyles, and had a bit role in State's Evidence. In 2007, she reunited with Friday Night Lights creator Peter Berg in the film The Kingdom in a cameo role as Ms. Ross alongside Jamie Foxx and Jennifer Garner. In 2009, she also appeared in the final scene of the film 500 Days of Summer as Autumn, a potential new love interest to Joseph Gordon-Levitt's character.

In August 2008, Kelly had been cast as the protagonist in The CW pilot series Body Politic. She played the role of Francesca "Frankie" Foster, who moves to Washington, D.C. to work for a senator and befriends a group of eager up-and-comers. Despite acclaim from critics who viewed the pilot, The CW did not pick up the series. Kelly also appeared in the pilot for the short-lived CBS comedy series Mad Love playing the role of Kate, a Midwestern girl who falls in love with Henry at the top of the Empire State Building. When the series was picked up, Kelly was replaced by Sarah Chalke.

In April 2010, Kelly appeared on the NBC drama series Parenthood. She played the role of a behavioral aide to the child character Max who is diagnosed with Asperger syndrome. Kelly went on to appear in nine episodes of the show before making her final appearance in the episode "Taking the Leap" which aired on March 29, 2011.

=== 2011–2020: Charlie's Angels, Titans and Film success ===
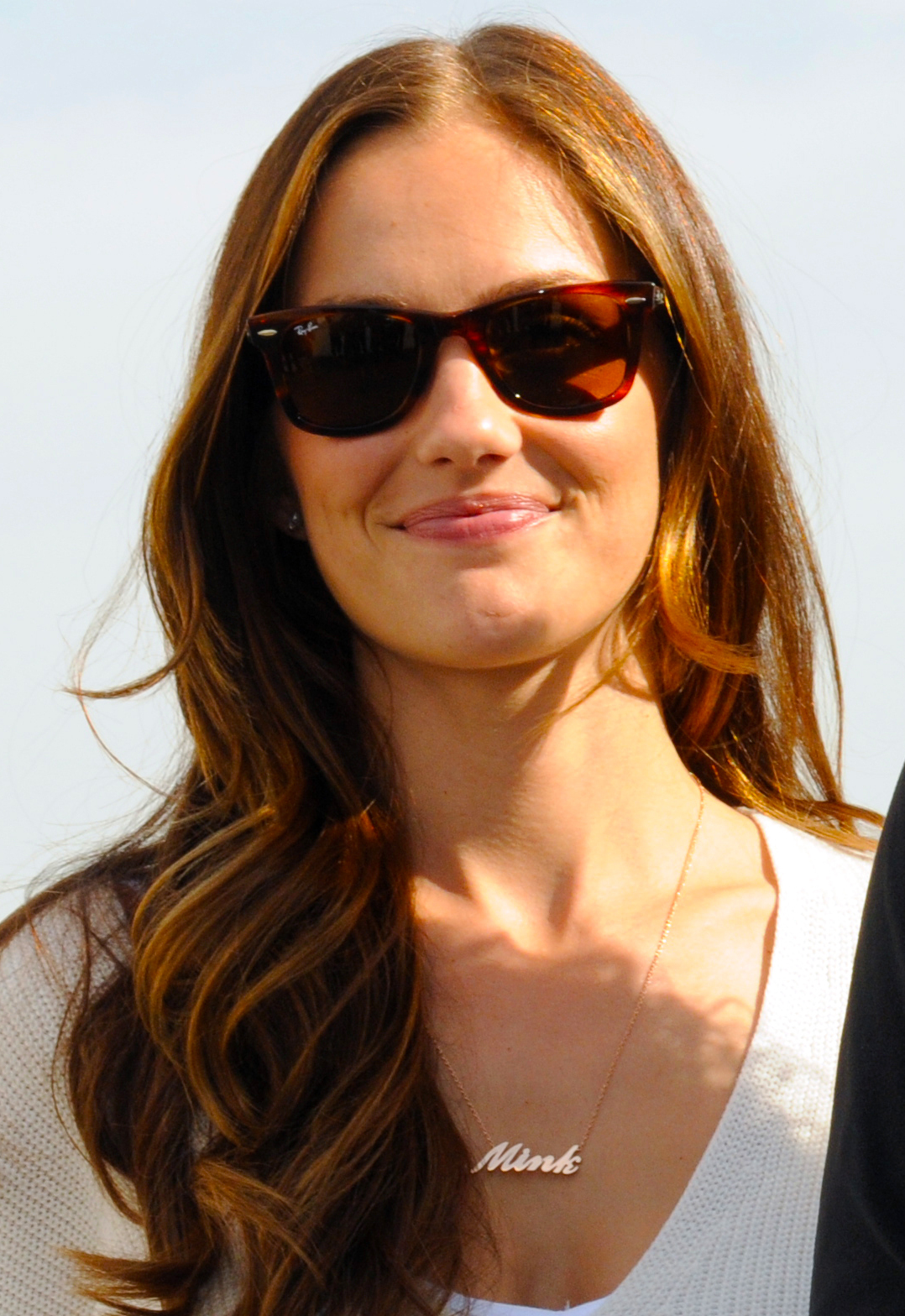
Kelly in 2012

In December 2010, ABC announced that Kelly was cast in the planned reboot of the crime drama series Charlie's Angels. She played the role of street racer Eve French. The pilot was filmed in March 2011 and the series was picked up on May 13, 2011. Charlie's Angels premiered on September 22, 2011, to over 8.76 million viewers. The series received unanimously negative reviews from critics. Despite a planned 13 episodes, ABC cancelled the series after the premiere of the fourth episode due to low ratings. The series concluded on November 10, 2011.

Kelly starred in the thriller film The Roommate as a college freshman whose roommate, portrayed by Leighton Meester, has an obsession with her that turns violent. Although released to generally negative reviews, the film went on to make over $15.6 million in its opening weekend and over $40 million worldwide.

She accepted a role in the Off Broadway play Love, Loss, and What I Wore for an April 27–May 29, 2011, run with Conchata Ferrell, AnnaLynne McCord, Anne Meara, and B. Smith. Variety announced that Kelly was cast as the lead in the mystery comedy film Searching for Sonny (2011). The film follows two reunited friends who are suspects in a murder mystery that is similar to a play in which they appeared during high school. Production took place in May and June 2010 in Fort Worth, Texas. The film won the "Best Narrative Feature" Award at the Festivus Film Festival. She wore a Diane von Fürstenberg dress. In June 2012, she appeared in the music video for "One More Night" by Maroon 5.

In 2013, Kelly portrayed Jacqueline Kennedy Onassis in the film The Butler, directed by Lee Daniels.

In September 2017, it was announced that Kelly had been cast on the DC Universe series Titans in a recurring role as Dawn Granger / Dove. The series premiered on October 12, 2018. Kelly was promoted to a series regular for the second season in September 2019. In May 2018, Kelly appeared in the video game Detroit: Become Human as North, the right-hand woman and potential love interest of protagonist Markus.

=== 2021–present: Television roles and memoir ===
Euphoria's show creator Sam Levinson specifically wrote the role of Samantha for Kelly, offering her the part in 2021. She played Samantha, a rich young mom, in four episodes of Euphoria's second season. On October 13, 2022, Deadline announced that Kelly will co-star alongside Maggie Grace and Dermot Mulroney in the upcoming psychological thriller Blackwater Lane, an adaptation of the 2017 novel The Breakdown by B.A. Paris. Blackwater Lane was released on June 21, 2024.

She played concert pianist Quinn, opposite Josh Duhamel, in Netflix's romantic western television series Ransom Canyon. Created and executive produced by April Blair, the show follows the lives of three ranching families in rural Texas. Filming for the show concluded in June 2024 after six months in Kelly's hometown Albuquerque and Las Vegas, New Mexico. Kelly worked with a piano teacher in Albuquerque and learned the piano parts for the role by memory/rote repetition, as she does not read music. Her then-boyfriend, Dan Reynolds, also helped her learn the piano parts by translating the music and showing her hand placements. The series premiered on April 17, 2025 and concluded on July 23, 2026, after two seasons. She was credited as executive producer for the second season.

Kelly starred in Netflix's original romantic comedy film Champagne Problems (2025), where she played an executive who travels to Paris and finds an unexpected romance.

=== Memoir ===
Kelly's book entitled Tell Me Everything: A Memoir was released on May 2, 2023 by Henry Holt and Company. Her memoir is a tribute to her mother and all working-class single mothers "who were dealt a bad hand." Publishers Weekly called it "an immensely moving story of one woman’s unconquerable spirit." Kirkus Reviews wrote in a favorable book review: "The author is not shy about discussing difficult topics, and this candid text will appeal to Kelly’s fans and to readers seeking a courageous story of self-acceptance. A generous and humane memoir." Actress Drew Barrymore called it "incredible and "powerful." The book became a major best-seller, debuting at number 12 on The New York Times non-fiction best-seller list for the week ending May 21, 2023. The book appeared on numerous lists as one of the best memoirs of 2023 such as Elle and The Washington Post.

== Philanthropy and activism ==
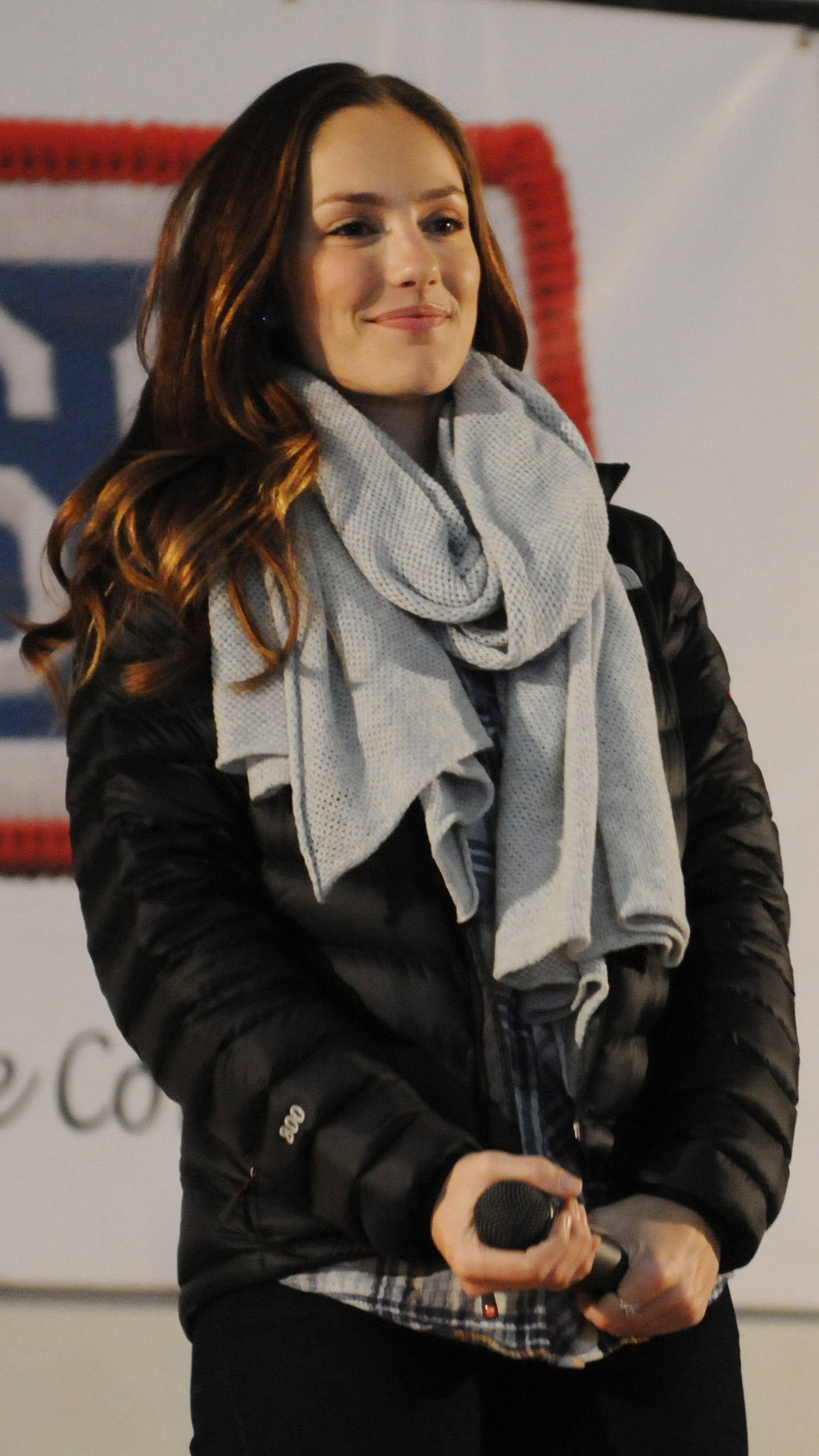
Kelly at a USO holiday troop visit at Bagram Airfield, Afghanistan in 2011

After Kelly's mother died in 2008, she decided to focus on helping others, saying: "I found that the only way to fill that hole in my heart was to be of service. And I wanted to be of service with women." In September 2009, Kelly teamed up with Emily Deschanel, Jaime King, Alyson Hannigan, and Katharine McPhee in a "video slumber party" featured on FunnyorDie.com to promote regular breast cancer screenings for the organization Stand Up 2 Cancer. Kelly joined an eight-day, four-country United Service Organizations tour in December 2011 with Chairman of the Joint Chiefs of Staff General Martin Dempsey, Robert Horry, Jordin Sparks, Thomas Miles, and Sergeant Major Bryan Battaglia.

Since 2009, Kelly has worked with retailer ABLE, which is dedicated to creating sustainable jobs for vulnerable women in Africa. ABLE started by employing and training women in Ethiopia who were former sex workers. In 2015, Kelly teamed up with ABLE to create a pouch in honor of International Women's Day. Kelly designed the clutch herself, including leather, color, stitching, size and color of the zipper. "I was affected on such a deep and profound level when I heard that one woman chose to go into the sex industry because she had to pay for sister's breast cancer treatment," Kelly said in a 2015 People interview. In 2019, she designed a jewelry collection "The Barbara Collection" for ABLE, which was named after one of ABLE's first jewelry designers, Barbara. The collection features rings, necklaces and hoop earrings, priced between $28 and $88.

List of charity products by Minka Kelly
Year	Title	Organization	Product
2015	"Minka x FashionABLE"	ABLE	The Hibret Zippered Pouch
2019–present	"ABLE x Minka"	ABLE	Jewelry collection
2023	"ABLE x Minka Kelly"	ABLE	The Minka Jewelry Collection 2023

== Public image ==
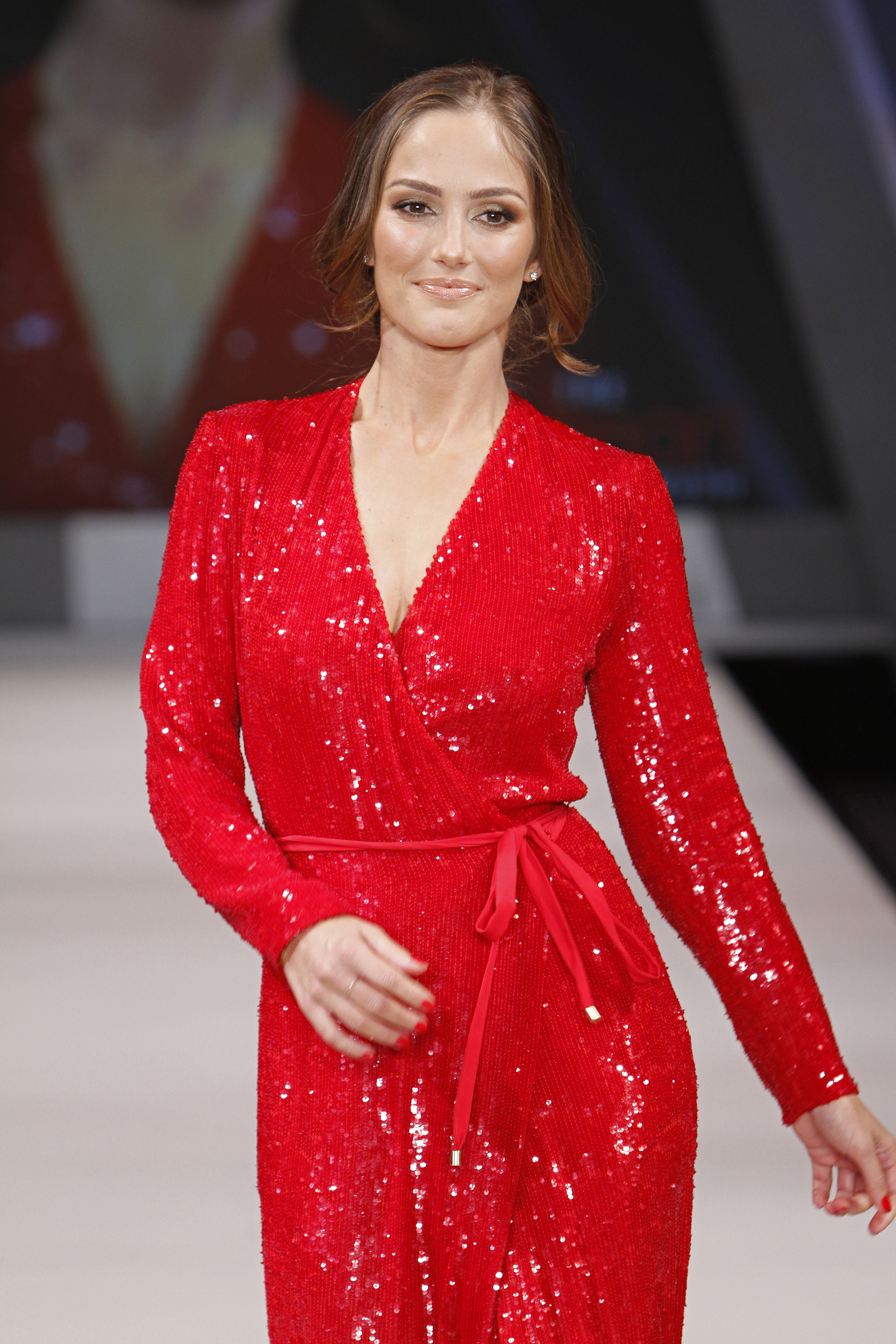
Kelly wearing Diane von Furstenberg at Mercedes-Benz Fashion Week in New York Fall 2012

Kelly has been included in various magazine lists of the world's most beautiful women. She appeared on People magazine's annual list of 100 Most Beautiful People in 2008. Kelly was named Sexiest Woman Alive and on the cover of Esquire magazine 2011 feature, one of 11 women named in Esquire's history. She has been a regular on Maxim's Hot 100 list since 2007 through 2011. Kelly was chosen as the fittest woman at the Gold's Gym 2nd Annual Hollywood’s Hottest Bodies Awards.

Kelly has appeared in print ads and commercials throughout her career. She has been a brand ambassador for Dove chocolate. She has appeared in commercials for Johnson & Johnson, Mucinex, and Bud Light's Super Bowl commercial. In 2016, Kelly became a spokesperson for online real estate marketplace Trulia to launch their "Best Neighborhoods in America" tool. She has appeared on the cover of numerous fashion and lifestyle magazines, including Marie Claire, Cosmopolitan, Esquire, Self and Health.

== Personal life ==
Kelly dated American actor Chris Evans. She dated former New York Yankees shortstop Derek Jeter from 2008 to 2011. Kelly was in a brief relationship with Jesse Williams. They met while making Detroit: Become Human, and split a few months after the game's release. She was in a relationship with comedian Trevor Noah between 2020 and 2022.

Kelly was in a relationship with singer/songwriter Dan Reynolds, frontman of Imagine Dragons from 2022 to 2026. They were first introduced by a mutual friend, and began talking on the phone while Kelly was on location filming in the UK. At the time Kelly was deep in writing her memoir Tell Me Everything. As she wrote, Reynolds sent her music he had just written and recorded, and Kelly eventually decided to send him her manuscript, once she turned in her final pages.

In 2015, Kelly attended culinary school and graduated from the New School of Cooking in Culver City, California. She has expressed an interest in launching a traveling cooking television show. In 2016, she appeared in Food Network's cooking show Star Plates, where celebrities worked as line cooks alongside top chefs in a restaurant kitchen.

== Filmography ==
=== Film ===
Year	Title	Role	Notes	Ref.
2003	The Turbo Charged Prelude for 2 Fast 2 Furious	Girl	Short film; Uncredited	
2005	Devil's Highway	River		
2006	The Pumpkin Karver	Tammy Boyles		
2006	State's Evidence	Girl #3		
2007	The Kingdom	Miss Ross		
2009	500 Days of Summer	Autumn		
2011	The Roommate	Sara Matthews		
2011	Just Go with It	Joanna Damon		
2011	Searching for Sonny	Eden Mercer		
2013	The Butler	Jackie Kennedy		
2015	The World Made Straight	Dena		
2015	Papa: Hemingway in Cuba	Debbie Hunt		
2017	Naked	Callie	Uncredited	
2018	Night Hunter	Angie		
2019	Shady Friend	Kara	Short film	
2020	She's in Portland	Sarah Hill		
2021	Lansky	Maureen Duffy		
2024	Bubbly Beautiful Kitty-Corn	Narrator	Short film	
2024	Blackwater Lane	Cassandra "Cass" Anderson		
2025	Champagne Problems	Sydney Price	Netflix original film	

=== Television ===
Year	Title	Role	Notes	Ref.
2004	Cracking Up	Monica	Episode: "Panic House"	
2004	Drake & Josh	Stacey	Episode: "Movie Job"	
2005	American Dreams	Bonnie	Episode: "Home Again"	
2005	What I Like About You	Ricki	3 episodes	
2006–2009	Friday Night Lights	Lyla Garrity	Main role (seasons 1–3); Guest role (season 4); 52 episodes	
2009	Body Politic	Francesca "Frankie" Foster	Unaired television pilot (The CW)	
2010–2011	Parenthood	Gaby	Recurring role; 9 episodes	
2010	Entourage	Herself	Episode: "Lose Yourself"	
2011	Charlie's Angels	Eve French	Main role; 8 episodes	
2013–2014	Almost Human	Valerie Stahl	Main role	
2015	Away & Back	Jennie Newsom	Television film (Hallmark Channel)	
2015	Man Seeking Woman	Whitney	Episode: "Sizzurp"	
2016	The Path	Miranda Frank	4 episodes	
2016	Star Plates	Herself	2 episodes	
2017	Jane the Virgin	Abbey Whitman	3 episodes	
2017	Bull	Kara Clayton	Episode: "School for Scandal"	
2018	The Beach House	Cara Rudland	Television film (Hallmark Channel)	
2018–2021	Titans	Dawn Granger / Dove	Recurring role (season 1); Main role (seasons 2–3); 19 episodes	
2019	Drunk History	Maurine Dallas Watkins / Florence Nightingale	2 episodes	
2019	Ludo à la Maison	Herself	Web series; Episode: "Quiche Lorraine by Chef Ludo Lefebvre and Minka Kelly"	
2020	Robot Chicken	Arya Stark, Mascot Judge	Voice role; Episode: "Petless M in: Cars Are Couches On The Road"	
2022	Euphoria	Samantha	4 episodes	
2025–2026	Ransom Canyon	Quinn O'Grady	Main role; 18 episodes Executive producer; 8 episodes	

=== Music video appearances ===
Year	Title	Artist(s)	Ref.
2002	"She Hates Me"	Puddle of Mudd	
2002	"If You C Jordan"	Something Corporate	
2012	"One More Night"	Maroon 5	

=== Video games ===
Year	Title	Role	Notes	Ref.
2018	Detroit: Become Human	North	Voice acting and motion capture	

=== Theatre ===
Year	Title	Role	Theatre	Ref.
2011	Love, Loss, and What I Wore	N/A	Westside Theatre (April 27–May 29, 2011)	

== Awards and nominations ==
Year	Ceremony	Award	Work	Result	Ref.
2007	Spike Guys' Choice Awards	Gift from the Gods	Friday Night Lights	Won	
2007	Gold Derby Awards	Ensemble of the Year (shared with cast)	Friday Night Lights	Nominated	
2009	Gold Derby Awards	Ensemble of the Year (shared with cast)	Friday Night Lights	Won	
2009	Teen Choice Awards	Choice TV Actress: Drama	Friday Night Lights	Nominated	
2011	Gold's Gym Annual Hollywood's Hottest Bodies Awards	The Fittest Female		Won	
2011	Teen Choice Awards	Choice Movie Actress: Drama	The Roommate	Nominated	
2011	MTV Movie & TV Awards	Best Scared-As-Shit Performance	The Roommate	Nominated	
2011	Spike Guys' Choice Awards	Best Girl on Girl Scene (shared with Leighton Meester)	The Roommate	Nominated	
2011	Teen Choice Awards	Choice Female Hottie		Nominated	
2012	Phoenix Film Festival	Best Ensemble	Searching for Sonny	Won	
2014	Acapulco Black Film Festival	Best Ensemble Cast (shared with cast)	The Butler	Nominated	
2020	Fashion Scholarship Fund	Social Impact Trailblazer of the Year		Won	
2023	Goodreads Choice Awards	Best Memoir & Autobiography	Tell Me Everything	Nominated	

== Bibliography ==
- Kelly, Minka. Tell Me Everything: A Memoir (2023). Henry Holt and Company. ISBN 1250852064.
