= Abide with Me (novel) =

Book by Elizabeth Strout

- First edition
- Author: Elizabeth Strout
- Language: English
- Publisher: Random House
- Publication date: March 14, 2006
- Publication place: United States
- Media type: Print (hardback)
- Pages: 304 pages
- ISBN: 1-4000-6207-1
- OCLC: 60669148
- Dewey Decimal: 813/.54 22
- LC Class: PS3569.T736 A64 2006
- Preceded by: Amy and Isabelle
- Followed by: Olive Kitteridge

Abide with Me is a 2006 novel (ISBN 1-4000-6207-1) by the American author Elizabeth Strout. The novel was published by Random House on March 14, 2006. The novel follows a religious leader, struggling with the death of his wife. It is set in a small town in New England, during the 1950s.

== Literary significance and reception ==
The novel received mixed reviews from critics. "The Washington Post said that while the novel is "dark, it's strenuousness pays off with an ending that provides a useful solution to all of us who are struggling. Strout cradles her characters - with all their weaknesses - in a level of understanding that 'somehow.. feels like a foretaste of salvation." The Atlantic Monthly said that "this lovely second novel confirms Strout as the possessor of an irresistibly companionable, peculiarly American voice: folksy, poetic, but always as precise as a shadow on a brilliant winter day." In their review of Abide with Me, Publishers Weekly noted that, "the uplifting ending arrives too easily, but on the whole, Strout has crafted a harrowing meditation of exile on Main Street." However, Kirkus Reviews was critical of the book saying that "most of the characters in this novel are fundamentally bewildered, and many of them are quite bitter as well. The narrator's folksy tone does nothing to enliven this dispiriting story; the overall effect is rather like listening to a slightly cantankerous maiden aunt dispensing local gossip."
