= The Burgess Boys =

Book by Elizabeth Strout

- 1st ed. Random House cover
- Author: Elizabeth Strout
- Audio read by: Cassandra Campbell
- Language: English
- Published: 2013
- Publisher: Random House
- Publication place: United States
- Media type: Print, e-book, audiobook
- Pages: 326 pages
- ISBN: 1400067685
- Preceded by: Olive Kitteridge
- Followed by: My Name Is Lucy Barton

The Burgess Boys (2013) is the fourth book by the American author Elizabeth Strout. The novel was first published in hardback on March 26, 2013, through Random House. The story follows two brothers who must return home to help out their sister after her son is accused of a hate crime. The novel is set in the fictional New England town of Shirley Falls, the setting of Strout's first novel, Amy and Isabelle.

== Synopsis ==
After their father died in a freak car accident, Jim and Bob Burgess were eager to leave their home in Shirley Falls, Maine. In the years that followed they managed to find careers in the legal field in New York City. Jim has been especially successful as a corporate lawyer while Bob became a Legal Aid attorney. The two have a seemingly loving but competitive relationship that is only truly challenged after their sister Susan calls them seeking assistance. Her son Zach has been accused of committing a hate crime against the Somali community of Shirley Falls. He had been caught throwing a pig's head into a Somali mosque during Ramadan, which he claims was meant only as a joke.

As the siblings reconnect, long-running tensions are brought to the surface. It's revealed that Bob has always resented Jim's teasing and Bob's twin sister Susan actively dislikes her twin. Jim is not immune to all of this, as he eventually finds that he has been taking his seemingly perfect home life for granted.

== Reception ==
Critical reception for The Burgess Boys has been positive. Writing for The New York Times, author Sylvia Brownrigg has rated the work favorably, writing that "Strout handles her storytelling with grace, intelligence and low-key humor, demonstrating a great ear for the many registers in which people speak to their loved ones. If there’s a weakness here, it’s Zach, offstage for much of the action in spite of being the catalyst for it." The Washington Times also praised the novel, as they felt that Strout "has a gift for straightforward storytelling and original turns of phrase, coupled with insight into the human heart and psyche."
