= Olive Kitteridge (miniseries) =

2014 American television miniseries drama

- Promotional poster
- Genre: Drama
- Based on: Olive Kitteridge by Elizabeth Strout
- Teleplay by: Jane Anderson
- Directed by: Lisa Cholodenko
- Starring: Frances McDormand; Richard Jenkins; Zoe Kazan; Rosemarie DeWitt; Martha Wainwright; John Gallagher Jr.; Devin Druid; Jesse Plemons; Bill Murray; Peter Mullan
- Music by: Carter Burwell
- Country of origin: United States
- Original language: English
- No. of episodes: 4

Production
- Executive producers: Gary Goetzman; Tom Hanks; Frances McDormand; Jane Anderson
- Producer: David Coatsworth
- Cinematography: Frederick Elmes
- Editor: Jeffrey M. Werner
- Running time: 233 minutes
- Production companies: HBO Miniseries; Playtone; As Is

Original release
- Network: HBO
- Release: November 2 – November 3, 2014

Olive Kitteridge is an American television miniseries based on Elizabeth Strout's 2008 novel. Set in Maine, the HBO miniseries stars Frances McDormand as Olive, Richard Jenkins as her loving husband Henry, Zoe Kazan as Denise Thibodeau, and Bill Murray as Jack Kennison. The show is divided into 4 parts, each depicting a certain point of time in the novel.

The miniseries debuted in the United States on November 2, 2014, on the American premium TV network HBO, which aired the show's first two episodes back-to-back that evening; the third and fourth episodes aired back-to-back the following evening. It was shown in a similar format in the United Kingdom on Sky Atlantic, on December 14 and December 15, 2014. It premiered in Australia on Showcase from 13 January 2015. At the 67th Primetime Emmy Awards, the miniseries won eight awards, including Outstanding Limited Series, Outstanding Lead Actress for McDormand, Outstanding Lead Actor for Jenkins and Outstanding Supporting Actor for Murray.

== Premise ==
Olive Kitteridge is a misanthropic and strict, but well-meaning, retired schoolteacher who lives in the fictional seaside town of Crosby, Maine. She is married to Henry Kitteridge, a kind, considerate man who runs a pharmacy downtown, and has a troubled son named Christopher, who grows up to be a podiatrist. For 25 years, Olive has experienced problems of depression, bereavement, jealousy, and friction with family members and friends.

== Cast ==
- Frances McDormand as Olive Kitteridge
- Richard Jenkins as Henry Kitteridge
- Zoe Kazan as Denise Thibodeau
- Rosemarie DeWitt as Rachel Coulson
- Martha Wainwright as Angela O'Meara
- Ann Dowd as Bonnie Newton
- Jesse Plemons as Jerry McCarthy
- Bill Murray as Jack Kennison
- John Gallagher Jr. as Christopher Kitteridge (adult)
- Devin Druid as Christopher Kitteridge (age 13)
- John Mullen as Kevin Coulson (age 13)
- Cory Michael Smith as Kevin Coulson (adult)
- Peter Mullan as Jim O'Casey
- Rachel Brosnahan as Patty Howe
- Brady Corbet as Henry Thibodeau
- Maryann Urbano as Linda Kennison
- Libby Winters as Suzanne
- Patricia Kalember as Joyce
- Audrey Marie Anderson as Ann
- Donna Mitchell as Louise Larkin
- Frank L. Ridley as Mr. Thibodeau
- Amanda Collins as Nurse Patricia

== Episodes ==
No.	Title	Directed by	Written by	Original release date
1	"Pharmacy"	Lisa Cholodenko	Jane Anderson	November 2, 2014
Maine, 1980. Olive Kitteridge is a no-nonsense high school math teacher who doesn't suffer fools and never hesitates to express an opinion, no matter how much hurt she might cause. She treats her husband Henry with indifference and is strict with her son Christopher, who struggles to please her. Henry is the local pharmacist and after his long-time assistant dies from a stroke, he hires a young woman, Denise Thibodeau, whose husband is also named Henry. The two Henrys go hunting with a third man, and the younger Henry is killed in a freak accident. The older Henry grows close to Denise after her husband's death, teaching her how to drive and gifting her an adopted kitten. Olive harbors an attraction to an English teacher at her school and takes an interest in Kevin Coulson, one of her students. Kevin's mother Rachel suffers from bipolar disorder.
2	"Incoming Tide"	Lisa Cholodenko	Jane Anderson	November 2, 2014
Years have passed and Kevin Coulson, now studying in New York City to be a psychiatrist, returns to town. He struggles with the effects of his mother Rachel's suicide and experiences symptoms of schizophrenia, including vivid hallucinations. Kevin is contemplating suicide himself, but is interrupted by Olive, who engages him in conversation about the town and notices a gun in the back seat of his car. Kevin also saves a former classmate from drowning. Christopher is about to marry, and Olive invites Kevin to attend the rehearsal dinner. Olive dislikes her future daughter-in-law, Suzanne, as well as her prospective in-laws. She invites Kevin to stay with them and to the wedding the next day. On the day of the wedding, Olive acts coldly to those around her, including her new in-laws and members of Suzanne's family.
3	"A Different Road"	Lisa Cholodenko	Jane Anderson	November 3, 2014
Olive and Henry are saddened when they receive a call from Christopher, now living in California and working as a podiatrist, to say that he and Suzanne are getting a divorce. Christopher appears content with his divorce and explains that he is in therapy. He also tells his parents that he will not be coming to Maine for a visit. Returning home from a dinner out, Olive and Henry stop at a hospital to use the bathroom. Two gun-toting addicts arrive looking for drugs, taking patients and staff members hostage. While held captive, Olive and Henry argue, blaming each other for Christopher's unwillingness to visit. Olive also reveals that she planned to leave him for her former colleague. After the ordeal, Christopher suggests that his parents should enter counseling, but Olive won't hear of it. Henry suffers a stroke and loses his ability to communicate.
4	"Security"	Lisa Cholodenko	Jane Anderson	November 3, 2014
Olive visits Christopher and his new wife Ann in New York City, but relations between them continue to be strained. Olive likes Ann more than she liked Christopher's first wife but is critical about how Ann parents her two children from previous relationships and her housekeeping skills. The tension culminates in a fight between Olive and Christopher, who argues that she was harsh and uncaring to him as a child. Olive returns from her trip early, learning that her husband has died. Six months later, Olive befriends a wealthy widower, Jack Kenison, and the two enter a relationship despite their initial disagreements.

== Reception and accolades ==
=== Critical response ===
Olive Kitteridge received widespread critical acclaim for its writing, directing, cinematography, and Frances McDormand's central performance as well as those of Jenkins, Murray and Gallagher. On review aggregator Rotten Tomatoes, the show has an approval rating of 95% based on 63 reviews, with an average rating of 8.68/10. The website's critics consensus reads: "Olive Kitteridge's narrative slow burn enhances fascinating performances – and a story worthy of its source material." On Metacritic, it has a weighted average score of 89 out of 100, based on 34 critics, indicating "universal acclaim".

=== Awards and nominations ===
Year	Award	Category	Nominee(s)	Result	Ref.
2014	Venice Film Festival	Silver Mouse	Lisa Cholodenko	Won	
2015	American Cinema Editors Awards	Best Edited Miniseries or Motion Picture for Television	Jeffrey M. Werner (for "A Different Road")	Nominated	
2015	Costume Designers Guild Awards	Outstanding Made for Television Movie or Miniseries	Jenny Eagan	Nominated	
2015	Critics' Choice Television Awards	Best Limited Series		Won	
2015	Critics' Choice Television Awards	Best Actor in a Movie or Limited Series	Richard Jenkins	Nominated	
2015	Critics' Choice Television Awards	Best Actress in a Movie or Limited Series	Frances McDormand	Won	
2015	Critics' Choice Television Awards	Best Supporting Actor in a Movie or Limited Series	Bill Murray	Won	
2015	Critics' Choice Television Awards	Best Supporting Actor in a Movie or Limited Series	Cory Michael Smith	Nominated	
2015	Directors Guild of America Awards	Outstanding Directorial Achievement in Movies for Television and Miniseries	Lisa Cholodenko	Won	
2015	Dorian Awards	TV Performance of the Year – Actress	Frances McDormand	Nominated	
2015	Dorian Awards	TV Director of the Year	Lisa Cholodenko	Nominated	
2015	Golden Globe Awards	Best Miniseries or TV Film		Nominated	
2015	Golden Globe Awards	Best Actress in a Miniseries or TV Film	Frances McDormand	Nominated	
2015	Golden Globe Awards	Best Actor in a Supporting Role in a Series, Miniseries or TV Film	Bill Murray	Nominated	
2015	Gracie Awards	Outstanding Producer – Entertainment	Jane Anderson	Won	
2015	Hollywood Post Alliance Awards	Outstanding Color Grading – Television	Pankaj Bajpai	Nominated	
2015	Make-Up Artists and Hair Stylists Guild Awards	Best Period and/or Character Hair Styling – Television Mini-Series or Motion Picture Made for Television	Cydney Cornell	Nominated	
2015	Make-Up Artists and Hair Stylists Guild Awards	Best Period and/or Character Makeup – Television Mini-Series or Motion Picture Made for Television	Christien Tinsley, Gerald Quist, and Liz Bernstrom	Nominated	
2015	Make-Up Artists and Hair Stylists Guild Awards	Best Special Makeup Effects – Television Mini-Series or Motion Picture Made for Television	Christien Tinsley, Gerald Quist, and Hiro Yada	Nominated	
2015	Online Film & Television Association Awards	Best Miniseries		Nominated	
2015	Online Film & Television Association Awards	Best Actor in a Motion Picture or Miniseries	Richard Jenkins	Nominated	
2015	Online Film & Television Association Awards	Best Actress in a Motion Picture or Miniseries	Frances McDormand	Won	
2015	Online Film & Television Association Awards	Best Supporting Actor in a Motion Picture or Miniseries	John Gallagher Jr.	Nominated	
2015	Online Film & Television Association Awards	Best Supporting Actor in a Motion Picture or Miniseries	Bill Murray	Won	
2015	Online Film & Television Association Awards	Best Supporting Actress in a Motion Picture or Miniseries	Rosemarie DeWitt	Nominated	
2015	Online Film & Television Association Awards	Best Direction of a Motion Picture or Miniseries	Lisa Cholodenko	Won	
2015	Online Film & Television Association Awards	Best Writing of a Motion Picture or Miniseries	Jane Anderson	Won	
2015	Online Film & Television Association Awards	Best Ensemble in a Motion Picture or Miniseries		Won	
2015	Online Film & Television Association Awards	Best Cinematography in a Non-Series		Won	
2015	Online Film & Television Association Awards	Best Costume Design in a Non-Series		Nominated	
2015	Online Film & Television Association Awards	Best Editing in a Non-Series		Won	
2015	Online Film & Television Association Awards	Best Makeup/Hairstyling in a Non-Series		Nominated	
2015	Online Film & Television Association Awards	Best Music in a Non-Series		Nominated	
2015	Online Film & Television Association Awards	Best New Theme Song in a Series		Nominated	
2015	Online Film & Television Association Awards	Best Production Design in a Non-Series		Nominated	
2015	Primetime Emmy Awards	Outstanding Limited Series	Gary Goetzman, Tom Hanks, Jane Anderson, Frances McDormand, Steven Shareshian, and David Coatsworth	Won	
2015	Primetime Emmy Awards	Outstanding Lead Actor in a Limited Series or a Movie	Richard Jenkins	Won	
2015	Primetime Emmy Awards	Outstanding Lead Actress in a Limited Series or a Movie	Frances McDormand	Won	
2015	Primetime Emmy Awards	Outstanding Supporting Actor in a Limited Series or a Movie	Bill Murray	Won	
2015	Primetime Emmy Awards	Outstanding Supporting Actress in a Limited Series or a Movie	Zoe Kazan	Nominated	
2015	Primetime Emmy Awards	Outstanding Directing for a Limited Series, Movie or a Dramatic Special	Lisa Cholodenko	Won	
2015	Primetime Emmy Awards	Outstanding Writing for a Limited Series, Movie or a Dramatic Special	Jane Anderson	Won	
2015	Primetime Creative Arts Emmy Awards	Outstanding Casting for a Limited Series, Movie or a Special	Laura Rosenthal and Carolyn Pickman	Won	
2015	Primetime Creative Arts Emmy Awards	Outstanding Hairstyling for a Limited Series or a Movie	Cydney Cornell	Nominated	
2015	Primetime Creative Arts Emmy Awards	Outstanding Main Title Design	Garson Yu, Synderela Peng, Michael Lane Parks, Alex Pollini, and John Robson	Nominated	
2015	Primetime Creative Arts Emmy Awards	Outstanding Costumes for a Contemporary Series, Limited Series or Movie	Jenny Eagan and Debbie Holbrook (for "Incoming Tide")	Nominated	
2015	Primetime Creative Arts Emmy Awards	Outstanding Makeup for a Limited Series or a Movie (Non-Prosthetic)	Christien Tinsley, Gerald Quist, and Liz Bernstrom	Nominated	
2015	Primetime Creative Arts Emmy Awards	Outstanding Single-Camera Picture Editing for a Limited Series or a Movie	Jeffrey M. Werner (for "Security")	Won	
2015	Satellite Awards	Best Miniseries Made for Television		Won	
2015	Satellite Awards	Best Actor in a Miniseries or a Motion Picture Made for Television	Richard Jenkins	Nominated	
2015	Satellite Awards	Best Actress in a Miniseries or a Motion Picture Made for Television	Frances McDormand	Won	
2015	Satellite Awards	Best Actress in a Supporting Role in a Series, Miniseries or Motion Picture Made for Television	Zoe Kazan	Nominated	
2015	Actor Awards	Outstanding Performance by a Male Actor in a Television Movie or Miniseries	Richard Jenkins	Nominated	
2015	Actor Awards	Outstanding Performance by a Female Actor in a Television Movie or Miniseries	Frances McDormand	Won	
2015	Television Critics Association Awards	Outstanding Achievement in Movies, Miniseries and Specials		Nominated	
2015	Writers Guild of America Awards	Long Form – Adapted	Jane Anderson; Based on the novel by Elizabeth Strout	Won	
2016	Artios Awards	Outstanding Achievement in Casting – Television Movie or Mini Series	Laura Rosenthal, Carolyn Pickman, Maribeth Fox, and Jodi Angstreich	Won	

== Home media ==
Olive Kitteridge was released by HBO on DVD and Blu-ray on February 10, 2015.

== See also ==
- List of Primetime Emmy Awards received by HBO
