= Olive, Again =

2019 novel by Elizabeth Strout

- First edition cover
- Author: Elizabeth Strout
- Audio read by: Kimberly Farr
- Cover artist: Dana Leigh Blanchette
- Language: English
- Series: Olive Kitteridge
- Release number: 2
- Set in: Crosby, Maine; Shirley Falls, Maine; Oslo, Norway
- Publisher: Random House
- Publication date: October 15, 2019
- Publication place: New York
- Media type: Print (hardcover)
- Pages: 304
- ISBN: 978-0-8129-9654-8
- Dewey Decimal: 813/.54
- LC Class: PS3569.T736 O45 2019
- Preceded by: Olive Kitteridge

Olive, Again is a novel by the American author Elizabeth Strout. The book was published by Random House on October 15, 2019. It is a sequel to Olive Kitteridge (2008), which won the 2009 Pulitzer Prize for Fiction. In November 2019, the novel was selected for the revival of Oprah's Book Club. Similar to the first novel, Olive, Again takes the form of 13 short stories that are interrelated but discontinuous in terms of narrative. It follows Olive Kitteridge from her seventies into her eighties.

== Stories ==
=== "Arrested" ===
Jack Kennison, a seventy-four-year-old widower and retired Harvard professor, drives to Portland to buy whiskey to avoid the possibility of running into Olive, who he has since separated from, at the grocery store in Crosby. Jack is pulled over by the police and given a ticket for speeding. Before and after this event, Jack is reflecting on three women in his life and his relationships and actions with them.

=== "Labor" ===
Olive attends a "stupid" baby shower. A pregnant guest goes into labor; Olive attempts to drive her to the hospital but finds herself delivering the young woman's baby in the back of her own car. Olive and Jack Kennison reconcile.

=== "Cleaning" ===
Kayley Callaghan is a fourteen-year-old girl living in Crosby whose father died two years earlier. She begins to find a passion for playing the piano, which her father played. While cleaning the house of her English teacher, Mrs. Ringrose, for money, Kayley begins experiencing sexual feelings and touches her breasts. She opens her eyes to find Mr. Ringrose watching her, urging her to continue. She agrees and later finds an envelope filled with money left for her by Mr. Ringrose when she leaves. She and Mr. Ringrose continue their unspoken arrangement every time she cleans the house. When her mother eventually finds the envelopes of money, Kayley instead hides it in the piano. One day, she comes home to find her mother sold the piano since she stopped playing it. Mrs. Ringrose tells Kayley she is no longer needed for cleaning. In the last days of summer, Kayley learns from Olive Kitteridge that Mr. Ringrose's behavior has become abnormal and he is being put in a nursing home. Two days before Kayley begins high school, she rides her bike near the nursing home and feels a longing for Mr. Ringrose.

=== "Motherless Child" ===
Olive invites her son Christopher, a podiatrist living in New York, to finally come visit Crosby with his wife, Ann, and their four children. Olive reveals her plans to marry Jack on the last night of their short visit, and Christopher expresses disbelief and anger. When Jack comes to meet Christopher and his family the next day, Christopher acts rudely to Jack ("childishly") and is quickly chastised by his wife. Christopher immediately apologizes and appears "pale as paper", though Olive feels pity for her son. Olive recalls yelling at her late husband Henry in public similarly to how Ann yelled at Christopher. Olive reflects that she has "failed on a colossal level" with both Henry and their son Christopher and has "lived her life as though blind."

=== "Helped" ===
Suzanne Larkin returns to Crosby, where her childhood home recently burned down with her father having died in the process. Suzanne finds a platonic consolation through conversations with her father's lawyer, Bernie Green. Bernie's compassion and empathy make a grieving Suzanne feel "as though huge windows above her had been smashed—the way the firemen must have smashed the windows of her childhood home— and now, here above her and around her, was the whole wide world right there, available to her once again." Bernie feels a similar connection to Suzanne, and is astonished by her "uncorrupted" nature.

Olive Kitteridge provides a very brief commentary that likely echoes the views of people in the town: they didn't know that Suzanne's mother was no longer living in the house, and that her father's death was very sad.

=== "Light" ===
Olive encounters a former student of hers, Cindy Coombs, while grocery shopping. Coombs, who previously worked as a librarian, is gravely ill. Olive visits her unannounced one day and continues to see her afterwards. The two discuss mortality, and Olive confesses her "pretty awful" treatment of Henry. She says that she has become "a tiny — tiny — bit better as a person" but feels sick that Henry is not alive to receive her that way. The story's title refers to Cindy and Olive's mutual appreciation for the light in February: "how at the end of each day the world seemed cracked open and the extra light made its way across the stark trees."

=== "The Walk" ===
Sixty-nine-year-old Denny Pelletier is walking alone one night in December in Crosby. He thinks something is wrong with his children, but he can't work out what it is. He reminisces about his childhood, his own children, his first love Dorothy Paige, and finally his wife Marie Levesque. Denny stumbles upon a man bent over a bench and calls the police, who arrive and intervene by injecting him with Naloxone. Denny walks home and realizes it is with himself that something is wrong, that he had been "saddened by the waning of his life, and yet it was not over." When he returns home and is greeted by his wife Marie.

There is a very brief reference to something said by Mrs Kitteridge to the class when his eldest son was in seventh grade - a social criticism/commentary.

=== "Pedicure" ===
Olive and Jack go for a day's drive; there is a reflection on pleasant activities they have: going for drives, a trip they took to Oslo, Norway. Olive has had her first pedicure, organized by Jack. Jack contemplates Olive, his late wife, Betsy, and his affair with Elaine Croft after Elaine comes into a restaurant where Jack and Olive are having dinner; it's an awkward interaction and Jack feels unsettled; he and Olive have a fight on the drive home. He thinks of and is frightened by "how much of his life he had lived without knowing who he was or what he was doing."

=== "Exiles" ===
Jim, Bob and Susan Burgess — the siblings from The Burgess Boys (2013) — reunite in nearby Shirley Falls; Jim and his wife Helen are visiting from New York City. The brothers' wives, Helen and Margaret, do not go with them; Susan doesn't like Helen, and the two wives don't like one another either. Helen and Margaret visit an outdoor art display, and bump into Olive Kitteridge, who gives a negative opinion about the art work. That evening, after drinking wine, Helen falls down the stairs at Bob and Margaret's place and breaks several bones. Following Helen's accident, Margaret confesses to her husband that "I couldn't stand her and she knew it, Bob. And I feel terrible."

=== "The Poet" ===
Olive, now eighty-two years old, drives to the coffee shop in Crosby. Her second husband, Jack Kennison, had died four months earlier. She runs into a former student of hers, Andrea L'Rieux, who went on to become the United States Poet Laureate. The following May, Olive is anonymously sent a poem written by Andrea that is based on their encounter. She is initially offended by Andrea's characterization of Olive as lonely. However, Olive eventually admits, "Andrea had gotten it better than she had, the experience of being another."

=== "The End of the Civil War Days" ===
Married couple Fergus and Ethel MacPherson live on the outskirts of Crosby and have been married for forty-two years. Though, the two have barely spoken to each other in the last thirty-five years. They have lived with yellow duct tape separating their house ever since Fergus had an affair. Their silence and separation is somewhat broken when their older daughter, Lisa, visits from New York City and tells them she works as a dominatrix and is the star of a new documentary. The story draws parallels between the performance aspect of Fergus' Civil War reenactments with their daughter's work as a dominatrix.

There is a very brief reference to something said by Mrs Kitteridge to the class that gave Lisa "courage" to be herself.

=== "Heart" ===
Olive, eighty-three years old, suffers a heart attack in her hairdresser's driveway. She is assigned round-the-clock care in her home by nurse's aides. Olive befriends two of the nurses: Betty, a Trump supporter, and Halima, the daughter of a Somali refugee. Christopher visits Olive frequently and eventually helps her get into Maple Tree Apartments, an assisted living facility.

=== "The Friend" ===
In Maple Tree Apartments, Olive has trouble settling in but then befriends Isabelle Daignault — the mother from Amy and Isabelle (1999). The two form a close friendship, caring for one another. Isabelle reflects with regret and shame for cutting off her daughter's hair, saying to Olive, "The memory haunts me." Olive's oldest age mentioned in the novel is 86.

== Reception ==
Kirkus Reviews praised the novel, writing, "Beautifully written and alive with compassion, at times almost unbearably poignant. A thrilling book in every way." Publishers Weekly called the novel "cohesive" and wrote, "Strout again demonstrates her gift for zeroing in on ordinary moments in the lives of ordinary people to highlight their extraordinary resilience." In her review for The Washington Post, Joan Frank gave the novel a positive review, calling it "arguably better than the original" and writing, "Sentences flow in simplest words and clearest order — yet line after line hammers home some of the most complex human rawness you'll ever read."
