= Anything Is Possible (book) =

Novel by Elizabeth Strout

- First edition
- Author: Elizabeth Strout
- Language: English
- Set in: Amgash, Illinois
- Published: 2017
- Publisher: Random House
- Publication place: United States
- Media type: Print, e-book, audiobook
- Awards: The Story Prize
- Preceded by: My Name Is Lucy Barton
- Followed by: Oh William!

Anything Is Possible is a 2017 novel of related short stories by the American author Elizabeth Strout. The novel returns to the fictional rural town of Amgash, Illinois, which is the protagonist's hometown in Strout's 2016 novel My Name Is Lucy Barton. Former U.S. President Barack Obama included Anything Is Possible on a list of the best books he read in 2017. Anything Is Possible won The Story Prize, a book award for short story collections.

== Contents ==
Story	Originally published in
"The Sign"	Original
"Windmills"	Original
"Cracked"	Original
"The Hit-Thumb Theory"	Original
"Mississippi Mary"	Original
"Sister"	Original
"Dottie's Bed & Breakfast"	Original
"Snow-Blind"	Virginia Quarterly Review
"Gift"	Original

== Reception ==
NPR's Heller McAlpin praised Strout as a master of the novel-in-stories form, with each short story filling in a piece of her “gracefully constructed narrative puzzle.”

Writing for The New York Times, Jennifer Senior said, “Strout was born to be an omniscient narrator, born to flit and swoop from one crooked perch to the next.”
