= My Name Is Lucy Barton =

2016 novel by Elizabeth Strout

- First edition hardback cover
- Author: Elizabeth Strout
- Audio read by: Kimberly Farr
- Language: English
- Published: 2016
- Publisher: Random House
- Publication place: United States
- Media type: Print, e-book, audiobook
- Pages: 208 pages
- ISBN: 1400067693
- Preceded by: The Burgess Boys
- Followed by: Anything Is Possible

My Name is Lucy Barton is a 2016 New York Times bestselling novel and the fifth novel by the American writer Elizabeth Strout. The book was first published in the United States on January 12, 2016, through Random House. The book details the complicated relationship between the titular Lucy Barton and her mother.

In July 2016, the novel was longlisted for the 2016 Man Booker Prize. The book was also shortlisted for the 2018 International Dublin Literary Award. The novel was also adapted for the theatre by Rona Munro as a one-woman show, with an acclaimed 2018 London production starting Laura Linney which transferred to New York in January 2020.

== Synopsis ==
Growing up in a dysfunctional household, Lucy Barton had a difficult childhood. Her father was abusive and while her mother loved Lucy, she was unable to protect her or her siblings from their father's mercurial mood swings and violent nature. As a result, Lucy would frequently take solace in reading, which led her to realize that she wanted to become a writer. When she came of age, Lucy quickly fled the family home. Years later Lucy is hospitalized after she develops an infection following an operation. During her stay, her mother comes to visit and the two reconnect after years of not speaking to each other.

== Reception ==
Critical reception for My Name Is Lucy Barton was positive and the work received praise from the Washington Post and the AV Club.

The Guardian compared the book favorably to Strout's earlier book, Olive Kitteridge, saying it "confirms Strout as a powerful storyteller immersed in the nuances of human relationships, weaving family tapestries with compassion, wisdom and insight." In a review with the New York Times, author Claire Messud praised the book's "beautifully too-human characters" and also drew favorable comparisons to Strout's earlier work.

== Stage adaptation ==
A monologue play adapted from the novel by Rona Munro opened at the Bridge Theatre in London in previews on June 2, 2018, and officially on June 6. The production was directed by Richard Eyre and starred Laura Linney. Linney reprised her role in the play's Broadway premiere at the Samuel J. Friedman Theatre, with preview performances beginning on January 6, 2020, and an official opening on January 15. Writing for The New Yorker, Alexandra Schwartz described how, "Strout’s language, deftly adapted for the stage by Rona Munro, is simple in the way of a coiled pot or a Shaker chair, a solid, unfussy construction whose elegance lies in its polished unity, and Linney, radiating warmth and lucidity, is just the right actor to bring it to life."

== Awards ==
- 2016 Man Booker Prize, longlist.
- 2018 International Dublin Literary Award, shortlist.
