= Blackwater Lane =

2024 supernatural horror film

- Theatrical release poster
- Directed by: Jeff Celentano
- Screenplay by: Elizabeth Fowler
- Based on: The Breakdown by B.A. Paris
- Produced by: Shaun Sanghani; Lucinda Rhodes Thakrar; Elizabeth Fowler; Warren Ostergard
- Starring: Minka Kelly; Maggie Grace; Dermot Mulroney
- Cinematography: Felix Cramer
- Edited by: Douglas Crise
- Music by: Nathan Halpern
- Production companies: Grindstone Entertainment Group; Clear Pictures Entertainment
- Distributed by: Lionsgate Films
- Release date: June 21, 2024
- Running time: 108 minutes
- Country: United States
- Language: English

Blackwater Lane is a 2024 American supernatural horror film directed by Jeff Celentano and written by Elizabeth Fowler, based on the 2017 novel The Breakdown by B.A. Paris. The film stars Minka Kelly, Maggie Grace, and Dermot Mulroney.

The film was released theatrically in the United States and on demand by Lionsgate Films on June 21, 2024.

== Plot ==
Cass, a teacher, is driving home on a country road on a rainy and foggy night. At a certain point, she sees a broken-down car on the side of the road and thinks she saw a woman inside it. She does not stop, but the next day she finds out that the woman in the car was one she knew and who has been murdered. Cass is distraught and begins to experience strange visions and memory lapses and starts feeling unsafe in the large medieval mansion where she lives with her husband.

== Cast ==
- Minka Kelly as Cassandra "Cass" Anderson
- Maggie Grace as Rachel
- Dermot Mulroney as Matthew Anderson
- Natalie Simpson as DC Lawson
- Kris Johnson as Alex Walters
- Edward Baker-Duly as Dr. Deakins
- Pandora Clifford as Susie
- Henry William Galpin as Cafe Waiter
- Mike Ray as Teacher
- Alan Calton as John Collins
- Judah Cousin as Andrew
- Sally Blouet as Jane Walters

== Production ==
In October 2022, it was announced that Minka Kelly, Dermot Mulroney, and Maggie Grace were set to star in Blackwater Lane.

Also in October, it was announced that filming had begun in Suffolk, England.

== Release ==
Blackwater Lane was released theatrically and on demand on June 21, 2024.

=== Critical reception ===
On the review aggregator website Rotten Tomatoes, 10% of 20 critics' reviews are positive.
