= Amy & Isabelle =

2001 film by Lloyd Kramer

- Based on: Amy and Isabelle by Elizabeth Strout
- Written by: Joyce Eliason; Lloyd Kramer
- Directed by: Lloyd Kramer
- Starring: Elisabeth Shue; Hanna Hall
- Music by: Ernest Troost
- Country of origin: United States
- Original language: English

Production
- Cinematography: Eric Alan Edwards
- Editor: Scott Chestnut
- Running time: 100 minutes
- Production company: Harpo Films

Original release
- Network: ABC
- Release: March 4, 2001

Amy & Isabelle is a 2001 made-for-television film produced through Oprah Winfrey's Harpo Films as part of her "Oprah Winfrey Presents" film line. It was directed by Lloyd Kramer, who had previously directed another film under the "Oprah Winfrey Presents" banner, Oprah Winfrey Presents: Mitch Albom's For One More Day. The book is based on the 1998 Elizabeth Strout book Amy and Isabelle and stars Elisabeth Shue and Hanna Hall as Isabelle and her daughter Amy.

Filming took place in South Carolina and the movie aired on ABC on March 4, 2001.

== Premise ==
Isabelle and Amy Goodrow are a mother and daughter that are currently living in the small mill town of Shirley Falls. The two are frequently at odds, something that is partially because Isabelle keeps everyone at a distance, which strains her relationship with her daughter. When her daughter meets Peter Robertson, a substitute math teacher at her school, she quickly falls for him – something that Peter is all too willing to exploit for his own purposes. Eventually this relationship becomes public, setting off public gossip and causing a fight between Amy and Isabelle that almost completely shatters their bonds.

== Cast ==
- Elisabeth Shue as Isabelle Goodman
- Hanna Hall as Amy Goodman
- Martin Donovan as Peter Robertson
- Conchata Ferrell as Bev
- Viola Davis as Dottie
- Marylouise Burke as Arlene
- Amy Wright as Rosie
- Ann Dowd as Lenora
- Stephi Lineburg as Stacy

== Reception ==
Critical reception for the film has been mixed. Time commented that the film "ramps up the melodrama" while praising Shue's acting, and People Magazine stated that it was "too dependent on voice-over narration, and the film ultimately turns on a revelation that I found predictable and implausible. Fortunately it has what matters most: characters worth caring about." Dove Media was also mixed in their opinion, as they found it to be a "well-acted presentation, with a message of healing relationships and acceptance of the weaknesses of others" while also finding it "depressing and unfulfilling."

Viewership for the film was high, with 19.4 million viewers tuning into ABC.
