= Tell Me Everything (novel) =

American novel

- Author: Elizabeth Strout
- Language: English
- Publication date: 2024

Tell Me Everything is a 2024 novel by American author Elizabeth Strout. It brings together characters from several of her previous works including Lucy Barton, Olive Kitteridge, and Bob Burgess—in the fictional town of Crosby, Maine. The novel was published on September 10, 2024, by Random House in the United States and by Viking in the United Kingdom.

== Plot ==
The novel is set in Crosby, Maine, during autumn. Bob Burgess, a semi-retired lawyer in his mid-sixties, takes on the defense of a man accused of murdering his elderly mother, Gloria Beach. The accused is an isolated individual who does not own a mobile phone and whose main occupation is painting nude portraits of pregnant women. Bob's client becomes the primary suspect after Gloria's body is discovered in a quarry pool. Bob has developed a close friendship with Lucy Barton, a well-known writer in her sixties who moved to Crosby with her ex-husband, William, during the COVID-19 pandemic. The two take regular walks together, during which they discuss their lives, fears, regrets, and the nature of their feelings for one another. Bob lives with his second wife, Margaret, a Unitarian minister. Lucy lives with William. Olive Kitteridge, now 90 years old and living in a retirement community on the edge of town, suspects that Bob and Lucy are in love. Olive asks Bob to introduce her to Lucy. The two women begin meeting in Olive's apartment, where they trade stories about people they have known "unrecorded lives," Olive calls them and debate what meaning, if any, such stories possess. The novel follows Bob's defense of his client, the evolving friendship between Lucy and Olive, and the unresolved romantic tension between Bob and Lucy. The murder case reaches a resolution, and the question of who was responsible for the death of Bob's father—a long-running issue in Strout's fiction—receives a further twist but remains ultimately unresolved. As Lucy tells Olive, when asked what the point of her stories is: "People and the lives they lead. That's the point."

== Background ==
Strout has said that she did not initially intend to bring the three characters together. She realized at some point that Olive Kitteridge, Lucy Barton, and Bob Burgess were all living in the same fictional town and "couldn't turn down that opportunity." The working title for the novel was The Book of Bob, because Strout found Bob "intriguing" and wanted him to "come out of semi-retirement and do something big and meaningful." The murder of Gloria Beach was the initial "kernel" of the plot, and Strout thought it would be the main story. As she wrote, however, the narrative expanded to accommodate the other characters and their relationships.

The novel uses an omniscient narrator that occasionally addresses the reader directly with phrases such as "as we have said." Strout has explained that she needed this narrative voice "to keep the reader going through everything" given the number of characters and interwoven stories.

== Publication ==
Tell Me Everything was published in the United States by Random House on September 10, 2024. The UK edition was published by Viking on September 19, 2024. The audiobook was narrated by Kimberly Farr. The novel was announced as an Oprah's Book Club pick upon its release.

== Reception ==
The Washington Post called the book "canny, radiant" and noted that it gathers Lucy and Olive "beneath a single tent, a family (or frenemy) reunion," while praising Strout's "agile grip on the dial." The Guardian described the novel as "taciturn but deeply felt and profoundly intelligent" and wrote that Strout produces "moments of such sadness or illumination that the reader may feel momentarily winded."

Kirkus Reviews offered a more measured assessment, acknowledging Strout's "tenderness for her characters and her belief that love is the only force in human lives as powerful as our essential loneliness" while suggesting that the novel covers "very well-plowed terrain" and that "more critical readers may feel it's time for her to move on."

== Awards ==
Tell Me Everything was shortlisted for the 2025 Women's Prize for Fiction. Strout had previously been longlisted four times and shortlisted twice for the same award.
