= Fashionable, Inc. =

American clothing retailer

Able
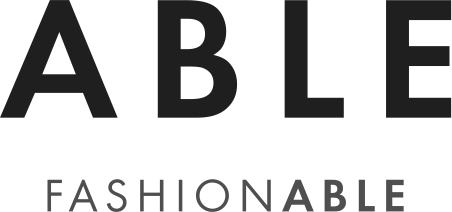
- Company type: Private
- Industry: Retail
- Founded: 2010
- Headquarters: 5022 Centennial Blvd, Nashville, Tennessee, U.S.
- Area served: Primarily the U.S. and Canada
- Key people: Barrett Ward; Rachel Ward
- Products: Clothing, handbags, accessories
- Website: livefashionable.com

ABLE is an American women's clothing and accessories retailer. The company was founded as a nonprofit organization in 2010 by Barrett Ward and Rachel Ward to encourage women of Addis Ababa, Ethiopia, to leave the commercial sex industry. Then it converted into a for-profit company and is classified as a benefit corporation.

The company is headquartered in Nashville, Tennessee.

Barrett Ward has been the CEO since the company was established.

== History ==
The concept for ABLE began in 2008 when Barrett Ward and his wife Rachel were living in Ethiopia. At the time, Ward worked with Mocha Club, a nonprofit organization he co-founded in 2005. While at Mocha, he communicated with Women at Risk (WAR) organization and learned that women, who might otherwise resort to prostitution due to lack of opportunity, could be trained to weave scarves and sell them for a profit. Ward co-founded Ellilta, an Ethiopian scarf production company, to provide jobs for the women at WAR. Ellilta was ABLE's first product manufacturing supplier, which launched in October 2010.

Minka Kelly brought ABLE scarves with her on The Tonight Show Starring Jimmy Fallon in October 2013. On October 22, 2014, Barrett Ward was honored by GQ at its seventh annual Gentlemen's Ball for his philanthropic efforts with ABLE.

In 2019, the company was presented in the Nashville Fashion Week.
