= Elizabeth Strout =

American writer (born 1956)

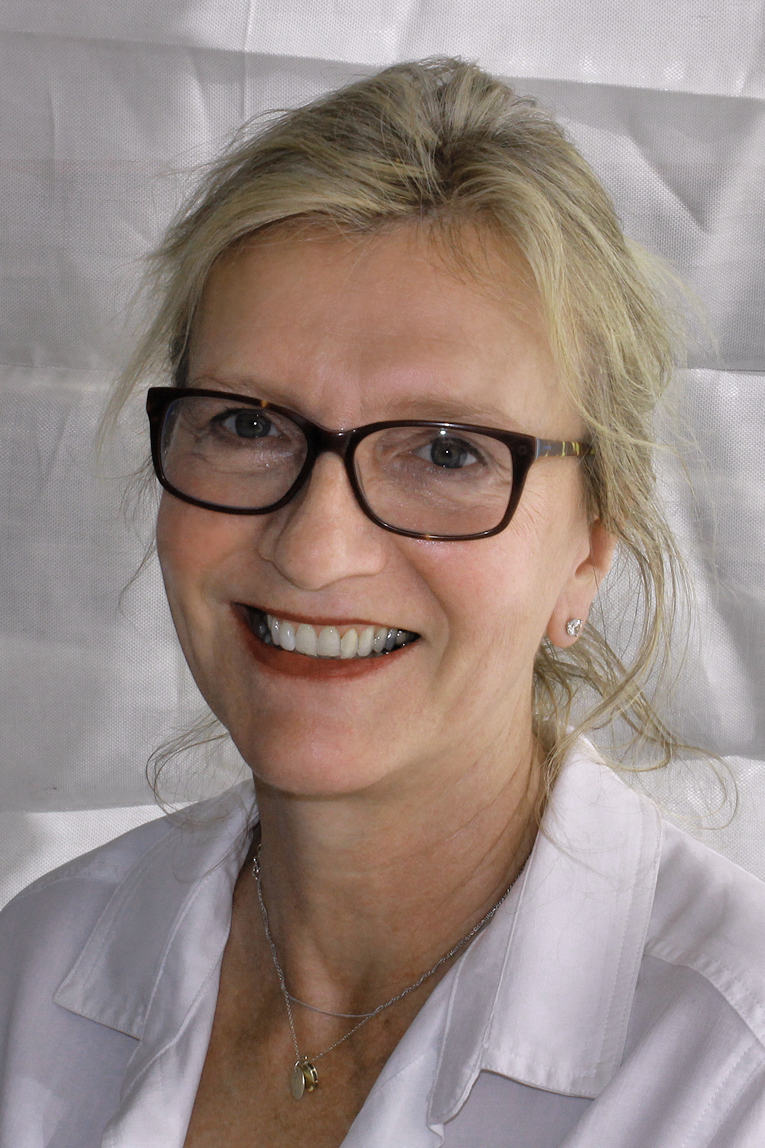
- Strout in 2015
- Born: Elizabeth Strout; January 6, 1956 (age 70); Portland, Maine, U.S.
- Education: Bates College (BA); Syracuse University (JD)
- Occupations: Novelist and short-story writer
- Spouse: James Tierney
- Writing career
- Genre: Literary fiction
- Notable works: Amy and Isabelle (1998); Abide with Me (2006); Olive Kitteridge (2008); The Burgess Boys (2013); My Name Is Lucy Barton (2016); Anything Is Possible (2017); Olive, Again (2019); The Things We Never Say (2026)
- Website: www.elizabethstrout.com

Elizabeth Strout (born January 6, 1956) is an American novelist and author. She is widely known for her works in literary fiction and her descriptive characterization. She was born and raised in Portland, Maine, and her experiences in her youth served as inspiration for her novels—the fictional "Shirley Falls, Maine" is the setting of four of her ten novels.

Strout's first novel, Amy and Isabelle (1998), met with widespread critical acclaim, became a national bestseller, and was adapted into a television film starring Elisabeth Shue. Her second novel, Abide with Me (2006), received critical acclaim but ultimately failed to be recognized to the extent of her debut novel. Two years later, Strout wrote and published Olive Kitteridge (2008), to critical and commercial success, grossing nearly $25 million with more than one million copies sold as of May 2017. The novel won the 2009 Pulitzer Prize for Fiction. The book was adapted into a multi Emmy Award-winning mini series and became a New York Times bestseller.

Five years later, she published The Burgess Boys (2013), which became a national bestseller. My Name Is Lucy Barton (2016) was met with international acclaim and topped the New York Times bestseller list. Lucy Barton later became the main character in Strout's 2017 novel, Anything Is Possible, a collection of linked stories about the town Lucy Barton came from, although Lucy only appears briefly in the book. A sequel to Olive Kitteridge, titled Olive, Again, was published in 2019. Oh, William!, a third Lucy Barton novel, was published in October 2021. She won the Siegfried Lenz Prize in 2022. Further novels in the Lucy Barton series, Lucy by the Sea and Tell Me Everything, were published in 2022 and 2024; the latter also depicts Olive and other characters from Strout's previous novels. The Things We Never Say is her most recent novel, published in 2026 by Random House.

== Early life and education ==
Strout was born in Portland, Maine, and was raised in small towns in Maine and Durham, New Hampshire. Her father was a science professor, and her mother was an English professor and also taught writing in a nearby high school.

After graduating from Bates College in Lewiston, Maine, she spent a year in Oxford, England, followed by studies at law school for another year. In 1982, she graduated with honors, and received a J.D. degree from the Syracuse University College of Law. That year, her first story was published in New Letters magazine.

== Career ==
=== Early career ===
Strout moved to New York City, where she waitressed and began developing early novels and stories to little success. She continued to write stories that were published in literary magazines, as well as in Redbook and Seventeen. She enrolled in Law School at Syracuse University, and practiced law for six months before a funding cut ended her job as a Syracuse legal-services advocate. In an interview with Terry Gross in January 2015 she said of the experience: "law school was more of an operation, I think." She stated in a 2016 interview with The Morning News,

I wanted to be a writer so much that the idea of failing at it was almost unbearable to me. I really didn’t tell people as I grew older that I wanted to be a writer—you know, because they look at you with such looks of pity. I just couldn’t stand that.

=== Rise to prominence with Amy and Isabelle ===
While teaching part-time at Borough of Manhattan Community College, Strout worked for six or seven years to complete her book Amy and Isabelle, which when published was shortlisted for the 2000 Orange Prize and nominated for the 2000 PEN/Faulkner Award for Fiction. Amy and Isabelle was adapted as a television movie, starring Elisabeth Shue and produced by Oprah Winfrey's studio, Harpo Films.

Strout was a National Endowment for the Humanities lecturer at Colgate University during the fall semester of 2007, where she taught creative writing at both the introductory and advanced levels. She was also on the faculty of the master of fine arts (MFA) program at Queens University of Charlotte in Charlotte, North Carolina.

=== Olive Kitteridge and its Pulitzer Prize ===
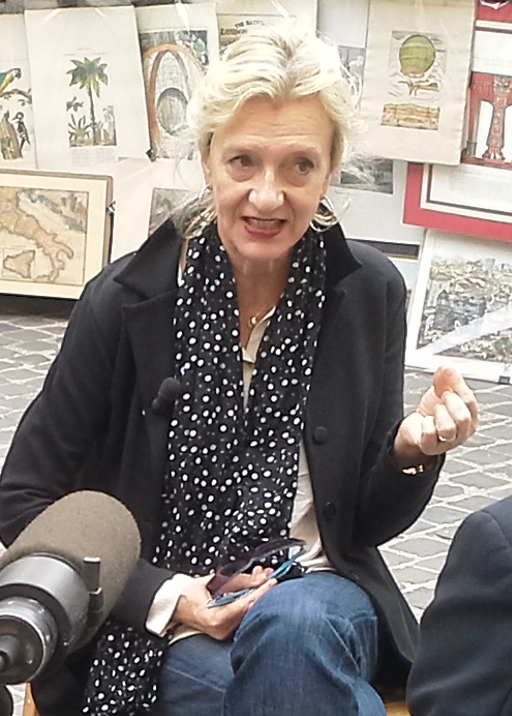
Strout being interviewed in Rome, Italy

Abide with Me was published in 2006 by Random House to further critical acclaim. Ron Charles of The Washington Post summarized her book by saying: "As she did in her bestselling debut, Amy and Isabelle, Strout sets her second novel in a small New England town, whose natural beauty she returns to again and again as this tale unfolds against the background of the Cold War tensions of the 1950s." The New Yorker welcomed the novel with a positive review: "with superlative skill, Strout challenges us to examine what makes a good story—and what makes a good life."

Strout's third book, Olive Kitteridge, was published two years later in 2008. The book featured a collection of connected short stories about a woman and her immediate family and friends on the coast of Maine. Emily Nussbaum of The New Yorker called the short stories "taciturn, elegant." In 2009, it was announced that the novel won the year's Pulitzer Prize for Fiction. The book became a New York Times bestseller and won the Premio Bancarella Award, at an event held in the medieval Piazza della Repubblica in Pontremoli, Italy. Louisa Thomas, writing in The New York Times, said:

The pleasure in reading Olive Kitteridge comes from an intense identification with complicated, not always admirable, characters. And there are moments in which slipping into a character’s viewpoint seems to involve the revelation of an emotion more powerful and interesting than simple fellow feeling—a complex, sometimes dark, sometimes life-sustaining dependency on others. There’s nothing mawkish or cheap here. There’s simply the honest recognition that we need to try to understand people, even if we can’t stand them.

=== The Burgess Boys and recent work ===
The Burgess Boys was published on March 26, 2013, to further critical acclaim. A New York Times review noted that Strout "handles her storytelling with grace, intelligence and low-key humor, demonstrating a great ear for the many registers in which people speak to their loved ones," but criticized her for not developing certain characters. NPR noted the novel by saying: "This is an ambitious novel that wants to train its gaze on the flotsam and jetsam of thought, as well as on big-issue topics like the politics of immigration and the possibility of second chances." The book became her second New York Times bestseller. The Washington Post reviewed it with the following observation: "[T]he broad social and political range of The Burgess Boys shows just how impressively this extraordinary writer continues to develop."

After a three-year break, she published My Name Is Lucy Barton (2016), a story about Lucy Barton, a recovering patient from an operation who reconnects with her estranged mother. The New York Times reviewed it with the following observation: "there is not a scintilla of sentimentality in this exquisite novel. Instead, in its careful words and vibrating silences, My Name Is Lucy Barton offers us a rare wealth of emotion, from darkest suffering to—‘I was so happy. Oh, I was happy’—simple joy." The novel topped The New York Times bestseller list. It was also longlisted for the Man Booker Prize.

Strout broke from her usual multi-year break in between novels to publish Anything Is Possible (2017), her sixth novel. Anything Is Possible was called a "literary mean joke" due to its "hurting men and women, desperate for liberation from their wounds" in contrast to its title. The novel had her noted as "a master of the story cycle" by Heller McCalpin of NPR. It was largely seen as an advance on her previous book due to its "ability to render quiet portraits of the indignities and disappointments of normal life, and the moments of grace and kindness we are gifted in response" according to Susan Scarf Merrell of The Washington Post. Anything Is Possible won The Story Prize for books published in 2017.

A sequel to Olive Kitteridge, titled Olive, Again, was published in October 2019. Olive, Again was selected for Oprah's Book Club.

In October 2021, Oh William! was published. The novel revisits the world of Lucy Barton, and according to Strout, is primarily about "how hard it is ever to know anyone, including ourselves". It was named to the shortlist of the 2022 Booker Prize.

A year later Strout published a pandemic novel, Lucy by the Sea. It portrays Lucy and her ex-husband William quarantining in Maine. The New York Times Book review praised the "intimacy and candor" of Lucy's voice, noting that her halting rhythms resonate.

In 2024, Strout returned to her characters Lucy Barton, Olive Kitteridge, Bob Burgess, and Isabelle Goodrow, now all living in Crosby, Maine, in Tell Me Everything. Oprah selected the novel for her book club, and it was shortlisted for the 2025 Books Are My Bag Readers' Awards. The Washington Post described it as "canny and radiant" and The New York Times Book Review praised its "abundance of searing and plain-spoken insights." Other reviews were less favorable. Both The New Republic and the TLS found the novel suffered from sentimentality, with the latter describing it as a "jostling, jarring mess."

In May 2026, she published the novel The Things We Never Say through Viking Press, and, in September 2026, it was shortlisted for The Booker Prize.

== Personal life ==
Strout is married to former Maine Attorney General James Tierney, lecturer in law at Harvard Law School and founding director of State AG, an educational resource on the office of state attorney general. She divides her time between New York City and Brunswick, Maine. Strout's daughter Zarina Shea is a playwright.

== Bibliography ==
=== Novels ===
- Amy and Isabelle (1998), ISBN 978-1-84983-304-2, OCLC 1019991003
- Abide with Me (2006), ISBN 978-0-7434-6228-0, OCLC 992776727
- Olive Kitteridge (2008), ISBN 978-1-4558-1505-0, OCLC 765624834
- The Burgess Boys (2013), ISBN 978-1-4711-2738-0, OCLC 990775129
- My Name Is Lucy Barton (2016), ISBN 978-0-8129-7952-7, OCLC 978251684
- Anything Is Possible (2017), ISBN 978-0-241-24879-9, OCLC 1023363064
- Olive, Again (2019), ISBN 978-0-8129-8647-1, OCLC 1184681389
- Oh William! (2021), ISBN 978-0-8129-8943-4, OCLC 1200038997
- Lucy by the Sea (2022), ISBN 978-0-593-44606-5
- Tell Me Everything (2024), ISBN 978-0-241-63435-6
- The Things We Never Say (2026), ISBN 978-0-241-81430-7

=== Essays and other contributions ===
- Offill, Jenny; Elissa Schappell, eds. (2005). The friend who got away : twenty women's true-life tales of friendships that blew up, burned out, or faded away. Introduction by Francine Prose. New York: Doubleday.

=== Profiles of Strout ===
- Levy, Ariel (May 1, 2017). "Elizabeth Strout's Long Homecoming: The author of 'Olive Kitteridge"' left Maine, but it didn't leave her". Life and Letters. The New Yorker. Vol. 93, no. 11. pp. 22–26.
- Egan, Elisabeth. "At 66, Elizabeth Strout Has Reached Maximum Productivity", The New York Times, 3 September 2022..

== See also ==
- List of American novelists
- List of Bates College people
- List of Syracuse University people
