= Tell Me Everything: A Memoir =

2023 memoir by Minka Kelly

Tell Me Everything
- Author: Minka Kelly
- Language: English
- Genre: Memoir
- Publisher: Henry Holt and Company
- Publication date: May 2, 2023
- Media type: Print (Hardcover)
- Pages: 288

Tell Me Everything: A Memoir is a 2023 memoir by American actress Minka Kelly. It was published on May 2, 2023, by Henry Holt and Company. In the memoir, Kelly discusses her childhood, relationships, personal struggles and rise to fame.

== Publication and promotion ==
Kelly's book entitled Tell Me Everything: A Memoir was released on May 2, 2023, by Henry Holt and Company. It is a tribute to her mother and all working-class single mothers "who were dealt a bad hand."

Kelly discussed the book in an exclusive interview with People magazine in April 2023. She embarked on a book tour, visiting New York City, Austin, Los Angeles and Ridgewood. She also appeared on Live with Kelly and Mark, Good Morning America and The View to promote the book.

The book debuted at number 12 on The New York Times non-fiction best-seller list for the week ending May 21, 2023. The book re-entered the non-fiction best-seller list in July 2023, spending two weeks on the list. Tell Me Everything was placed at number 15 on The New York Times audio nonfiction best-seller list in June 2023.

== Synopsis ==
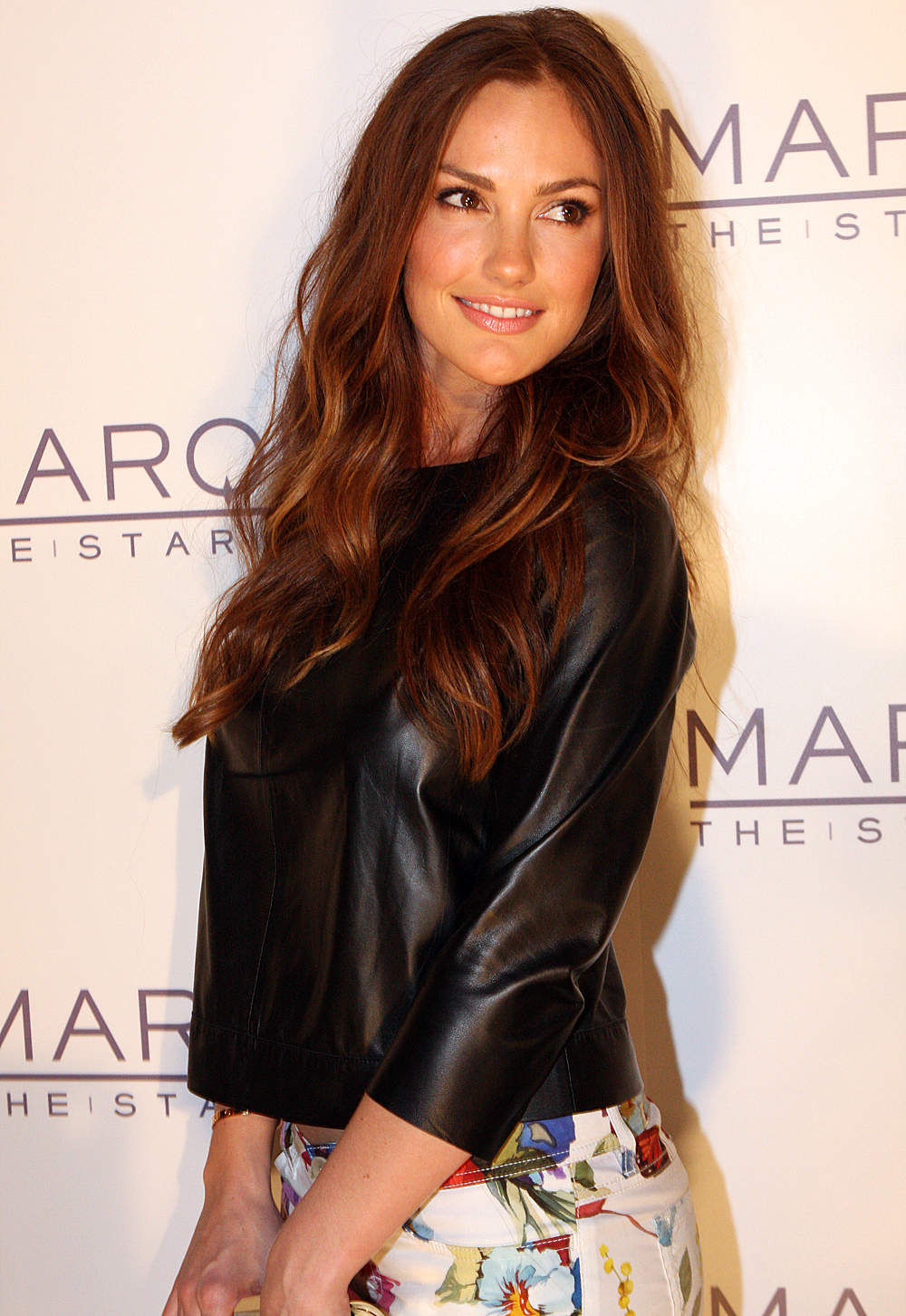
The book was written by actress Minka Kelly.

In her memoir, Kelly discusses her childhood growing up with a single mother, who worked as a stripper and struggled with addiction. Her mother struggled to make ends meet. They often lived with friends and family, even living in a garage and storage room of an apartment complex. Maureen met guitarist Rick Dufay in 1979 at a recording studio in Los Angeles. Their casual romance led to a pregnancy, but Dufay was about to go on tour with Aerosmith and wasn't ready to be a full-time father. They reunited briefly a few years later and moved to New York City, but they both ended up doing drugs again.

Maureen then began an on-again, off-again relationship with David, who would become a father figure to Kelly. Maureen, David and Kelly moved to Albuquerque, New Mexico, to live with David's extended family and remained there while Kelly went to middle and high school. Kelly was bullied at school and got into physical fights with students.

Maureen and David decided to move to Boston and Kelly was left without a place to live. Determined to graduate from high school, Kelly wanted to stay in Albuquerque and moved in with her boyfriend, Rudy's family. She describes him as mentally abusive and manipulative. He pressured Kelly to get a tattoo and even make a sex tape. Kelly became pregnant and had an abortion at 17. Kelly saved money and got her own apartment in Albuquerque. She then reconnected with her father, Dufay and decided to move to Los Angeles. Afterwards, she discusses her journey into modeling and acting.

Her mother died of colon cancer in 2008 and Kelly recounts her death in the memoir.

== Reception ==
The book was well received by the public and critics. Tell Me Everything has been called one of the best celebrity memoirs of 2023 by numerous media outlets such as Elle and The Washington Post. Adrienne Gaffney of Elle wrote: "In a childhood devoid of security, Kelly searched for ways to cope and speaks honestly now about everything from an on-set romance to the pain of pregnancy loss. Tell Me Everything is a gorgeous debut that transcends the celebrity category." Publishers Weekly called it an "immensely moving story of one woman’s unconquerable spirit." Kirkus Review wrote in a favorable book review: "The author is not shy about discussing difficult topics, and this candid text will appeal to Kelly’s fans and to readers seeking a courageous story of self-acceptance. A generous and humane memoir."

Actress Drew Barrymore called it "incredible and "powerful." The Washington Post wrote in a review: "Much of her poignant new memoir, "Tell Me Everything," is an intricate portrait of her addiction-afflicted single mother, Maureen, who raised her while drifting through a haze of stripping gigs, volatile relationships and tenuous living situations. It's not that Kelly is shielding herself from scrutiny. Vulnerable, self-aware and admirably introspective, she confronts her childhood trauma to decipher how it shaped her — first into an aimless teen and industrious 20-something, then into a middle-aged woman still unpacking that pain." On November 15, 2023, Shondaland placed the book at number 10 on its list of "The Best Celebrity Memoir Audiobooks Read by the Authors" and wrote: "Kelly reads the book with grace, even when she gets to the tough moments, and you’ll walk away afterward with your jaw on the floor. What she’s been through is intense, proving that not everyone in Hollywood got their start thanks to nepotism. Definitely don’t miss this one."

== Accolades ==
Year	Ceremony	Award	Work	Result
2023	Elle	The Best Memoirs of 2023 (So Far)	Tell Me Everything: A Memoir	Shortlisted
2023	Shondaland	The Best Celebrity Memoir Audiobooks Read by the Authors	Tell Me Everything: A Memoir	10th place
2023	The Washington Post	The 7 Best Celebrity Memoirs of 2023	Tell Me Everything: A Memoir	Shortlisted
2023	Goodreads Choice Awards	Best Memoir & Autobiography	Tell Me Everything: A Memoir	Nominated
2023	Audible	Best of the Year 2023	Tell Me Everything: A Memoir	Won
