= Three Tales (Flaubert) =

Book by Gustave Flaubert

Three Tales (French: Trois contes) is a work by Gustave Flaubert, originally published in French in 1877. It consists of the short stories: “Un Cœur simple” (“A Simple Heart”), “La Légende de Saint Julien l’Hospitalier” (“The Legend of St. Julian, Hospitaler”), and “Hérodias” (“Herodias”). The stories are dominated by questions of doubt, love, and religious experience. They reveal Flaubert's exploration of the complexities of human emotions through distinct narrative styles.

== Stories ==
=== A Simple Heart ===
"A Simple Heart", or Un cœur simple in French, has been described as a heart-breaking tale of a simple servant woman and her life-long search for love.

==== Plot ====
After her lover Théodore marries a well-to-do woman to avoid conscription, Felicité quits the farm where she works and heads for Pont-l'Évèque, where she picks up work in a widow's house as a servant. She is very loyal and easily lends her affections to the two children of her mistress, Mme Aubain. She gives entirely to others; although many take advantage of her, she is unaffected. Everyone she loves dies, including her nephew Vincent (he dies in the United States, after contracting yellow fever). Mme Aubain's daughter Virginie, and finally her pet parrot, bequeathed to her by a family who had spent time in the United States and brought the bird back. For Felicité, the parrot is a remembrance of her nephew.

She has no husband, no children, and no property, and is reliant on her mistress to keep her. After Aubain dies, she is left impoverished in the mostly empty house, where she dies on the day of the Feast of Corpus Christi.

=== The Legend of Saint Julien the Hospitaller ===
"The Legend of Saint Julien the Hospitaller", La légende de Saint-Julien l'hospitalier in French, is a story about Julian the Hospitaller (unrelated to the Order of Hospitallers, despite the similarity of the names). It explores the themes of fate, sin, and redemption through the life of its protagonist.

==== Plot ====
Julien is predicted to do great things: his father is told that he will marry into the family of a great emperor, while his mother is told that he will be a saint. They dote on him. After Julian kills a mouse who interrupted his concentration in church, his cruelty towards animals grows and culminates in the massacre of an entire valley of deer. A stag curses him to kill his own parents. He almost brings the curse to fruition twice: he drops a sword while standing on a ladder near his father, and he pins his mother's white shawl against a wall with a javelin because it looked like bird's wings. He leaves to escape his future (much like Oedipus).

Julian joins a band of vagrants, and they eventually grow into a huge army under his control. He makes a name for himself and marries rich, but never hunts. Finally, his wife convinces him to go hunt, and he is haunted by the spirits of all of the animals he has killed. He returns home to surprise his wife and finds a man and a woman in her bed. Unknown to him, his parents had arrived to see him, and his wife had given them her bed. He thinks that it is another man sleeping with his wife and murders them. He recognizes his misdeed and leaves once again.

Having given all of his possessions to his wife, Julian begs for food but is shunned for his deeds. He comes across a deserted river crossing and decides to live a life of servitude. One day, there is a great storm, and a leper wishes to cross. It is rough, but Julian does not give up. Once across, the leper's requests increase. He wishes for food and wine, Julian's bed, and finally the warmth of Julian's body. When Julian gives the man everything without hesitation, the leper is revealed to be Jesus Christ himself, who takes Julian with him to heaven.

=== Hérodias ===
"Hérodias" explores themes of power, manipulation and moral decay within a historical context.

==== Plot ====
Hérodias is the retelling of the beheading of John the Baptist. It starts slightly before the arrival of the Syrian governor, Vitellius. Herodias holds a huge birthday celebration for her second husband, Herod Antipas. Unknown to him, she has concocted a plan to behead John. According to Flaubert, this plan entails making her husband fall in love with her daughter, Salomé, leading to him to promise whatever she wants. Salomé, obviously in the line with her mothers instructions, will ask for John's head. Everything goes as planned. John has been repeatedly insulting the royals, so the king does not hesitate to grant Salomé's wish. The crowd gathered for the party waits anxiously while the executioner, Mannaeus, kills John. The story ends with some of John's disciples awaiting the Messiah.

== Sources and legacy ==
- "A Simple Heart" was inspired by several events in Flaubert's own life: he also lived in a farmhouse in rural Normandy, he also was adrift in his studies, much like Paul. Most importantly, he had an epileptic seizure in the same way that Félicité does in the story.
- Gustave Flaubert wrote "A Simple Heart" under encouragement from his good friend and author George Sand.
- "The Legend of Saint Julian the Hospitalier" was inspired by a large stained-glass window at Rouen Cathedral.
- "Hérodias" is based on the biblical figure of the same name. Flaubert based the section on the dance of Salomé from a bas-relief also at Rouen Cathedral and his own experience watching a young female dancer while in Egypt.
- "A Simple Heart" was the inspiration for Flaubert's Parrot, a novel by Julian Barnes.
- "Hérodias" is said to have influenced Oscar Wilde's Salome (1893) and Jules Massenet's opera Hérodiade (1881); "The Legend of Saint Julian the Hospitalier" was the basis for an opera of the same title by Camille Erlanger (1888).

== Translations ==
=== Public domain ===
1. 1903: Anonymous, published by M. Walter Dunne
2. 1921: Arthur McDowall

=== In copyright ===
1. 1944: George Burnham Ives, published by New Directions
2. 1961: Robert Baldick, published by Penguin Classics
3. 1991: Alban J Krailsheimer, published by Oxford World's Classics
4. 2005: Roger Whitehouse, published by Penguin Classics

==== Individual stories ====
- A Simple Heart:
1. 1961: Robert Baldick
2. 1981: Frederick Brown
3. 2004: Charlotte Mandell, published by Melville House Publishing
4. 2005: Geoffrey Wall, published by Penguin Random House
5. 2015: Lydia Davis
6. 2015: Roger Whitehouse, published for Penguin Classics
- The Legend of St. Julian the Hospitaller: 1996/2004: Charlotte Mandell, published by Melville House Publishing
