= Olive Kitteridge =

2008 novel by Elizabeth Strout

- First edition hardcover
- Author: Elizabeth Strout
- Language: English
- Series: Olive Kitteridge
- Release number: 1
- Genre: Short stories
- Set in: Crosby, Maine
- Publisher: Random House
- Publication date: March 25, 2008
- Publication place: United States
- Media type: Print (hardcover)
- Pages: 288 pages
- ISBN: 978-1-4000-6208-9
- OCLC: 123767230
- Dewey Decimal: 813/.54 22
- LC Class: PS3569.T736 O5 2008
- Followed by: Olive, Again

Olive Kitteridge is a 2008 novel or short story cycle by American author Elizabeth Strout. Set in Maine in the fictional coastal town of Crosby, it comprises 13 stories that are interrelated but narratively discontinuous. Olive Kitteridge is a main character in some stories and has a lesser or cameo role in others. Six of the stories had been published in periodicals between 1992 and 2007.

The novel won the 2009 Pulitzer Prize for Fiction and was a finalist for the 2008 National Book Critics Circle Award. HBO produced a 2014 four-part miniseries adaptation featuring Frances McDormand in the title role and Richard Jenkins as her character's husband. The series won eight awards at the 67th Primetime Emmy Awards including Outstanding Limited Series, Outstanding Lead Actor for Jenkins and Outstanding Lead Actress for McDormand. A sequel to the novel, titled Olive, Again, was published on October 15, 2019, by Random House.

== Stories ==
=== "Pharmacy" ===
The first story centers on Henry Kitteridge, the pharmacist of the town of Crosby and husband of Olive, and his relationship with his new employee, Denise Thibodeau. Henry daydreams of taking care of Denise after the tragic death of her husband, when he gets mistaken for a deer and gets shot by his best friend. Even though Henry still loves his cantankerous wife Olive, Henry Kitteridge has various fantasies about Denise and is thinking of her in an unfaithful way. Jerry McCarthy, the former delivery boy of the pharmacy who got a new well paid job, eventually proposes to Denise and the couple moves to Texas. Denise maintains contact with Henry through a yearly birthday letter.

=== "Incoming Tide" ===
Kevin Coulson returns to Crosby where he grew up, planning to go to his childhood home and die by suicide. While sitting in his car he is approached by Olive Kitteridge, his former math teacher, who enters his car and speaks to him frankly about his mother's suicide years before and her own father's suicide. Kevin decides not to go through with his plan. Olive notices that a former classmate of Kevin's, Patty Howe, has fallen into the dock, and Kevin rescues her. The story illuminates Kevin’s emotional world and explores his thoughts throughout his visit in Crosby.

=== "The Piano Player" ===
Angela (Angie) O'Meara, now in her 50s, has played the piano in the cocktail lounge at the Warehouse Bar and Grill for many years. Her co-workers include Joe, the bartender, and Betty, a waitress.

Angie lives in a rented room on Wood street and does not own a car. She walks to a grocery store and to the Warehouse. Angie has been involved with Malcolm Moody, the town of Crosby's first selectman, for over twenty years. Malcolm is married and has children.

On a Friday night, a week before Christmas, Angie arrives at her usual time of 6pm. Angie has stage fright and began drinking vodka at five fifteen before she left. Due to her stage fright, Angie never takes her twenty-minute break when playing.

At the beginning of her shift Olive Kitteridge and her husband arrive at the bar, which pleases Angie who likes Henry who she reckons to be a kind person. Angie plays Henry Kitteridge's favourite song - Good Night, Irene - when she sees that the Kitteridges are leaving.

Walter Dalton, a former college professor, is an alcoholic. Walter is at the Warehouse every night that Angie is playing. Walter brings Angie presents and buys her drinks. Malcolm does not like Walter and has made unkind comments about Walter to Angie.

Simon, an old boyfriend, comes into the Warehouse. Simon used to play the piano at the Warehouse and is now a real estate lawyer in Boston. Simon tells Angie he is married and has three grown children. Simon begins to leave but returns to tell Angie about a sexual encounter he had with her mother in Boston. Simon tells Angie he has pitied her for many years and then leaves.

On this evening, feeling out of sorts, Angela does something she had never done and takes a break. Angie borrows change from Walter and uses a pay phone to call Malcolm at his home number. When Malcolm answers the phone, Angie tells him she cannot see him anymore.

On her way home, Angie is surprised by Malcolm outside the house where she lives. Malcolm curses at Angie for calling him at home and calls her a drunk. In the story's final scene Angie contemplates her life on the stairs in front of her house and is left with the realization that certain people are kind and that others aren't.

=== "A Little Burst" ===
Olive's only child, Christopher, finally marries at the age of 38. Olive finds the wedding overwhelming since, in her mind, she is very close to Chris. Olive Kitteridge spends the majority of the story in the newly married couple's bedroom where she contemplates her son's wedding. Through the opened window, she overhears her new daughter in law, Suzanne, making fun of the dress Olive is wearing, and implying that Olive is difficult. Infuriated, Olive steals and damages some of Suzanne's clothes, giving her a little burst of happiness of the kind Olive depends on to make her life worth living. The story explores Olive's feelings and in particular the love for her son.

=== "Starving" ===
Harmon, who runs the local hardware store, begins an affair with the widow Daisy Foster after his wife, Bonnie, informs him she is no longer interested in sex. Harmon observes Tim Burnham and his girlfriend Nina and is intrigued by their loose attitudes towards drugs and sex. When Tim leaves Nina, she goes to Daisy for help and reveals she has anorexia. Olive Kitteridge, Harmon and Daisy all try to help Nina; Daisy writes to her. Nina had returned to live with her parents and there was hope for her recovery, but she was admitted to hospital after becoming increasingly unwell, where she suffers a heart attack and dies. These events cause Harmon to realize he is in love with Daisy and he rents Tim and Nina's former home, in preparation for leaving Bonnie.

=== "A Different Road" ===
Olive reflects on an occasion when she stopped at a small hospital emergency room to use their bathroom. Despite not feeling ill, she was persuaded by a nurse to have an examination. The delay meant that Olive and Henry were there when two young men invaded the hospital looking for drugs. Held hostage alongside the nurse and the doctor, Henry and Olive began quarreling, with Olive disparaging Henry's mother and Henry taking the nurse's side when Olive rebuked her for praying. After their rescue, tensions remain between the couple and Olive reflects how their relationship has been affected by their experiences at the hospital.

=== "Winter Concert" ===
Bob Houlton is 75 years old. His wife Jane, is 72, and used to work as a school nurse. One evening Bob and Jane attend a Christmas concert at St. Catherine church; Olive and Henry Kitteridge are also there. At intermission, Bob and Jane talk with Allan and Donna Granger. Donna Granger mentions seeing Bob at the airport in Miami.

Returning to their seats, Jane asks Bob about being in Miami. Bob says Donna must have confused Miami with Orlando, where he had gone on a business trip. Jane indicates to Bob she would like to leave the concert. In the car on the way home, Jane tells Bob she hates Donna Granger. Jane tells Bob her opinion of Donna as a parent, especially to her two daughters.

After more intense questioning from Jane, Bob admits he was in Miami. Bob tells Jane that during a business trip to Orlando, he went to Miami to see a woman from his past. Bob states that the women contacted him and told him she had breast cancer. Jane is hurt by the revelation. Bob tells Jane he made a mistake, and he did not enjoy the visit. Bob tells Jane he has not spoken to the person since and does not know if she is alive. Jane tells Bob she does not want to talk about the person again and Bob agrees. Jane tells Bob she wants to sit on the couch before going to bed. Bob sits with Jane and falls asleep. Bob awakes with a startle and Jane asks him if he was dreaming. Bob tells Jane he dreamt the concert hall roof fell in. Jane comforts Bob and reflects on their time together.

=== "Tulips" ===
Olive's son Chris and his new wife have moved to California. After a year, Chris announces that they are divorcing but he will be staying in California. Olive and Henry try to adjust to retired life, but Henry suffers a stroke which leaves him unresponsive, forcing him to move to a care home. Olive finds herself contemplating suicide now that she lives alone. After receiving a condolence note, Olive goes to visit Louise Larkin. Louise and her husband have become shut-ins after their son Doyle committed murder. Louise talks about suicide with Olive and mocks her for lying to make her life appear better than it is. Shortly after visiting Henry, Olive gives him "permission" to die but he continues to live.

=== "Basket of Trips" ===
Olive helps set up the wake of Ed Bonney, something Henry would have done were he well. During the wake, Kerry Monroe, the cousin of Ed's widow Marlene, becomes intoxicated and makes a scene. Olive later finds Marlene with Kerry, who has passed out. Marlene confesses to Olive that, since Ed died, Kerry has confessed to having previously had an affair with him. She asks Olive to dispose of a basket filled with pamphlets for vacation packages which Marlene now feels unable to look at.

=== "Ship in a Bottle" ===
Winnie's sister Julie is left at the altar by her fiancé Bruce, who tells her he wants to continue dating, but does not want to get married. While Winnie and Julie are talking privately, Julie repeats advice from Olive Kitteridge as encouraging, although they both think she is scary. Julie's mother Anita threatens to kill Bruce and disown Julie if she continues her relationship with him after he left her at the altar. Nevertheless, Julie leaves on a bus to go to Bruce in Boston. Anita finds a note Julie wrote to Winnie asking her to stop her parents finding out and Winnie realizes that something between her and her mother is now broken.

=== "Security" ===
Chris has married a second time and is now living in New York City. He asks Olive to visit and she goes, realizing that Chris's invitation is only a way to get her to help out with his two young stepchildren. Olive dislikes Chris's new wife Ann, who smokes and drinks while pregnant, but does her best to help out. After an incident during a trip to get ice cream, Olive tells Chris she wants to leave and they quarrel. Olive leaves New York City and goes home early with neither her son nor daughter-in-law taking her to the airport.

=== "Criminal" ===
Rebecca Brown's grandfather, Reverend Tyler Caskey, was a Congregationalist minister. Rev. Caskey's first wife died and left him with two small girls. Rev. Caskey remarried and had Rebecca's mother. Rebecca's mother married a minister, Reverend Brown. Rebecca's mother left her husband to go to California to become an actress.

Rebecca's father did not remarry. Rebecca's mother occasionally sent her postcards from California. Rebecca sent many letters to her mother at the last address she had for her. Rebecca's father had a rule, no talking at the dinner table. She and her father had their meals in silence. After her father died, Rebecca developed an almost compulsive urge to talk.

Olive Kitteridge had been Rebecca's math teacher and had made her anxious. Rebecca graduated from high school and attended a university two hours away. When asked about her mother, Rebecca would say her mother had "passed away". Rebecca fell in love with a fellow student, Jace Burke. Jace was a piano player. He left the university and played at bars in Boston. On weekends, Rebecca would take a bus and stay with Jace at his apartment. Jace broke up with Rebecca when he met another woman.

One day at her doctor's office, Rebecca took a magazine from the waiting room. There was a story in the magazine that Rebecca wanted to finish. The story was about a man who came home for lunch every day and sat at the kitchen table talking with his wife. The wife was not satisfied with her life and at the end of the story left her husband. The man stopped coming home for lunch. Rebecca takes the pages with the story out of the magazine and burns the pages in the kitchen sink.

During another visit to her doctor's office, Rebecca looks for something to steal. She saw a small glass vase on the windowsill. During the office visit, Rebacca's doctor tells her all diagnostic tests were negative, and he did not know the source of her stomach pain. The doctor suggested that Rebecca has a sensitive stomach. On her way out of the doctor's office, Rebecca places the vase in her knapsack and leaves.

Rebecca lives with her boyfriend David who runs a health club. Their apartment is across the street from a bar. Rebecca observes the activity taking place in the parking lot of the bar, including visits by the police. Rebecca is looking for a job and has an interview for a dental assistant position. Rebecca does not get the job and tells David it may have been because she talked too much. Rebecca does get a job typing traffic reports for an agency that studies traffic flow in different cities.

One night Rebecca looks out the kitchen window and sees three police cars in the parking lot of the bar. Rebecca sees two policemen escort a man out of the bar, read him his rights, and placed him in back of a police car. Rebecca sits in her kitchen and thinks about how long it would take her to walk to her doctor's office. Rebecca places lighter fluid, the post cards from her mother, and a shirt she bought for David in her knapsack. She puts two cigarette lighters in her coat pocket and walks out of her apartment.

=== "River" ===
After Henry's death, Olive meets widower Jack Kennison, a retired professor, after she finds him having fainted on a walking path. Olive and Jack build up a friendship that blossoms into romance despite their different political beliefs. Olive begins a new relationship with him realizing she has found a reason to live again.

== Characters ==
The Kitteridge Family

- Olive Kitteridge – an abrasive junior high school math teacher, later a volunteer for a variety of organizations including the American Red Cross and a museum in Portland, Maine.
- Henry Kitteridge – Olive's husband, Crosby's town pharmacist.
- Pauline Kitteridge – Henry's mother. She and Olive had a bad relationship.
- Ora – Olive's aunt.
- Christopher "Chris" Kitteridge – Olive and Henry's son, a podiatrist.
- Dr. Suzanne "Sue" Bernstein-Kitteridge – Chris's first wife, Jewish, from Philadelphia, Pennsylvania, persuades him to leave Crosby and move to California, they divorce soon thereafter.
- Ann Kitteridge – Chris's second wife, met in a support group for divorcees, encourages him to follow their therapist to New York City.
- Theodore – Ann's son by her first marriage.
- Annabelle – Ann's daughter, father never identified, apparently the result of a fling after her divorce.

The Thibodeau/McCarthy Family

- Denise Thibodeau – works at Henry Kitteridge's pharmacy, the not-so-secret object of his affection.
- Henry Thibodeau – Denise's first husband, a former football hero, works as a plumber, killed in a hunting accident by his best friend Tony Kuzio.
- Jerry McCarthy – overweight delivery boy at the pharmacy, eventually becomes Denise's second husband, they move to Texas.
- Paul McCarthy – Jerry and Denise's teenaged son, obese like his father.

Lounge Patrons and Employees

- Angela "Angie" O'Meara – alcoholic piano player.
- Malcolm Moody – Crosby's first selectman, having an extramarital affair with Angie.
- Joe – bartender.
- Betty – waitress.
- Walter Dalton – alcoholic regular, former college professor, Malcom Moody calls him a "fairy."
- Simon – Angie's former boyfriend, also a piano player, left her to become a real estate lawyer in Boston, Massachusetts.

The Foster Connections

- Daisy Foster – goes to church with Henry Kitteridge (whereas Olive will not).
- Copper Foster – Daisy's deceased husband, a policeman.
- Harmon – surname never given, owns hardware store, has an affair with Daisy.
- Bonnie – Harmon's wife, he eventually leaves her for Daisy. They have 4 adult sons, but only two are named.
- Kevin – One of Harmon and Bonnie's sons, he keeps in closest contact with his parents.
- Derrick – Another of Harmon and Bonnie's sons, more aloof.
- Martha – Kevin's wife, a vegetarian.

The Burnham Connections

- Timothy "Tim" Burnham – sawmill worker, busted for growing marijuana.
- Nina White – Tim's girlfriend, has anorexia, Daisy Foster, Harmon and Olive all try to help her, eventually dies in treatment.
- Victoria – Nina's friend who eventually steals Tim from her and worsens her eating disorder.
- Kathleen Burnham – Tim's aunt.

The Houlton Family

- Jane Houlton – school nurse at junior high school, works with Olive.
- Bob Houlton – Jane's husband, apparently has a former mistress in Miami, Florida.
- Becky Houlton – Jane and Bob's daughter.
- Tim Houlton – Jane and Bob's son.

The Granger Family

- Alan Granger – he and his wife are called "The Lydias" by the Houlton family, because their connection is through their daughter.
- Donna Granger – the other half of "The Lydias," has eye lift surgery that Jane Houlton finds disturbing.
- Lydia Granger – Alan and Donna's daughter, married a veterinarian who bit her.
- Patty Granger – another daughter of Alan and Donna.

The Larkin Family

- Roger Larkin – a banker.
- Louise Larkin – Roger's wife, a guidance counselor at Olive's school, undergoes shock therapy in Portland.
- Doyle Larkin – Roger and Louise's son, murders a woman by stabbing her repeatedly.
- Suzanne Larkin — Roger and Louse's daughter, now married to a lawyer and living in Boston.

The Monroe-Bonney Family

- Marlene Monroe Bonney – Olive's former student, also mentioned as a customer at Harmon's hardware store.
- Ed Bonney – Marlene's high school sweetheart and eventual husband, owns a grocery, dies after a lengthy illness.
- Eddie Bonney – Marlene and Ed's son, serves in the United States Coast Guard.
- Lee Ann Bonney – Marlene and Ed's daughter, studying to become a nurse.
- Cheryl Bonney – Marlene and Ed's younger daughter.
- Kerry Monroe – Marlene's cousin, gets in trouble with the law, briefly tries to seduce Chris Kitteridge, an alcoholic, gets a job at the Bonney grocery, seduces Ed (which she reveals at his funeral before passing out).

The Harwood Family

- Anita Harwood – cashier at hospital coffee shop, former "Miss Potato Queen".
- Jim/Jimmy Harwood – Anita's husband, school janitor, recovering alcoholic.
- Winnifred "Winnie" Harwood – Anita and Jim's daughter.
- Julie – Anita's daughter by her first marriage, one of Olive's former students.
- Kyle – Winnie's uncle, evidently Anita's brother, supplies the family with tranquilizers.
- Ted – Anita's first husband, Julie's father, a carpenter.
- Bruce – Julie's fiancé who jilts her on their wedding day, a vacationer from Boston who rented a cottage with his brothers.

The Brown-Caskey Family

- Rebecca Brown – one of Olive's former students, a kleptomaniac who can't get a job.
- David – Rebecca's live-in boyfriend.
- Rev. Carleton Brown – Rebecca's father.
- Charlotte Caskey Brown – Rebecca's mother, abandons her family, moves to Tarzana, California where she becomes a follower of Scientology.
- Katherine Caskey – Rebecca's aunt.
- Rev. Tyler Caskey – Rebecca's grandfather, a Congregational minister.

Townfolk

- Bob Beane – encountered Angie O'Meara's ex-boyfriend Simon in Boston.
- Andrea Bibber – one of Olive's former students, a Social Worker
- Cynthia Bibber – Andrea's mother, suggests Olive and Henry are depressed after hospital incident.
- Mary Blackwell – indiscreet nurse who revealed Louise Larkin had undergone shock treatments at the hospital where she used to work in Portland, later takes a job at a local nursing home.
- Susan Bradford – attends Ed Bonney's funeral.
- Emily Buck – postal clerk.
- Cindy – Henry Kitteridge's nurse at the assisted living facility after he has a stroke.
- Molly Collins – home economics teacher, she and Olive help Marlene Bonney host a reception after her husband's funeral.
- Candy Connelly – Harmon's fourth grade crush.
- Harry Coombs – died of lymphoma.
- Dr. Kevin Coulson – returns from New York to commit suicide, impulse interrupted by a visit with Olive and a near drowning.
- Bessie Davis – old maid, frequent customer at Harmon's hardware store, lonely, talks too much.
- Mrs. Granger – cantankerous employee at Henry Kitteridge's pharmacy, dies in her sleep, replaced by Denise Thibodeau.
- Matt Grearson – attends Ed Bonney's funeral.
- Cecil Green – "slow", he brings coffee and donuts to the reporters who hover around the Larkin home after Doyle murders a woman.
- Patty Crane Howe – waitress at the marina, recently miscarried, almost drowns but is rescued by Kevin Coulson and Olive.
- Rachel Jones – gets Valium from Henry Kitteridge after her husband leaves her.
- Jack Kennison – stuffy Harvard graduate, retired in Crosby with wife, they have one daughter (unnamed) who is a lesbian and lives in California, he and Olive begin dating after they are both widowed, she is shocked to discover he is a Republican.
- Mrs. Kettleworth – Daisy Foster stole a pear from her front yard when she was a child.
- Tony Kuzio – Henry Thibodeau's lifelong friend, kills him in a hunting accident.
- Miss Lampley – Chris Kitteridge's first grade teacher.
- Beth Marden – operates a nursery school, Julie's former employer.
- Donny Madden – attends Ed Bonney's funeral.
- Greg Marston – buys ball bearings at Harmon's hardware store.
- Mrs. Merriman – gets her blood pressure medicine at Henry Kitteridge's pharmacy.
- Cliff Mott – suffering from heart disease but still shovels snow.
- Bill Newton – friend of Henry and Olive Kitteridge.
- Bunny Newton – Bill's wife, Olive's confidant.
- Karen Newton – Bill and Bunny's daughter, cheats on her husband Eddie.
- Jim O'Casey – taught at junior high school with Olive, he picked her and Chris up every morning to drive them to school, spoke of leaving their spouses and running away together but he died in an automobile accident, perhaps while drunk, before acting on this impulse.
- Wayne Roote – has dementia.
- Betty Simms – close neighbor of Olive and Henry, had five children.
- Mrs. Tibbets – gets erythromycin prescription filled at Henry Kitteridge's pharmacy.
- Les Washburn – landlord, rents a house first to Tim Burnham and Nina White, but evicts them after a pot bust, later rents the same house to Daisy Foster and Harmon.
