= Laura Linney on screen and stage =

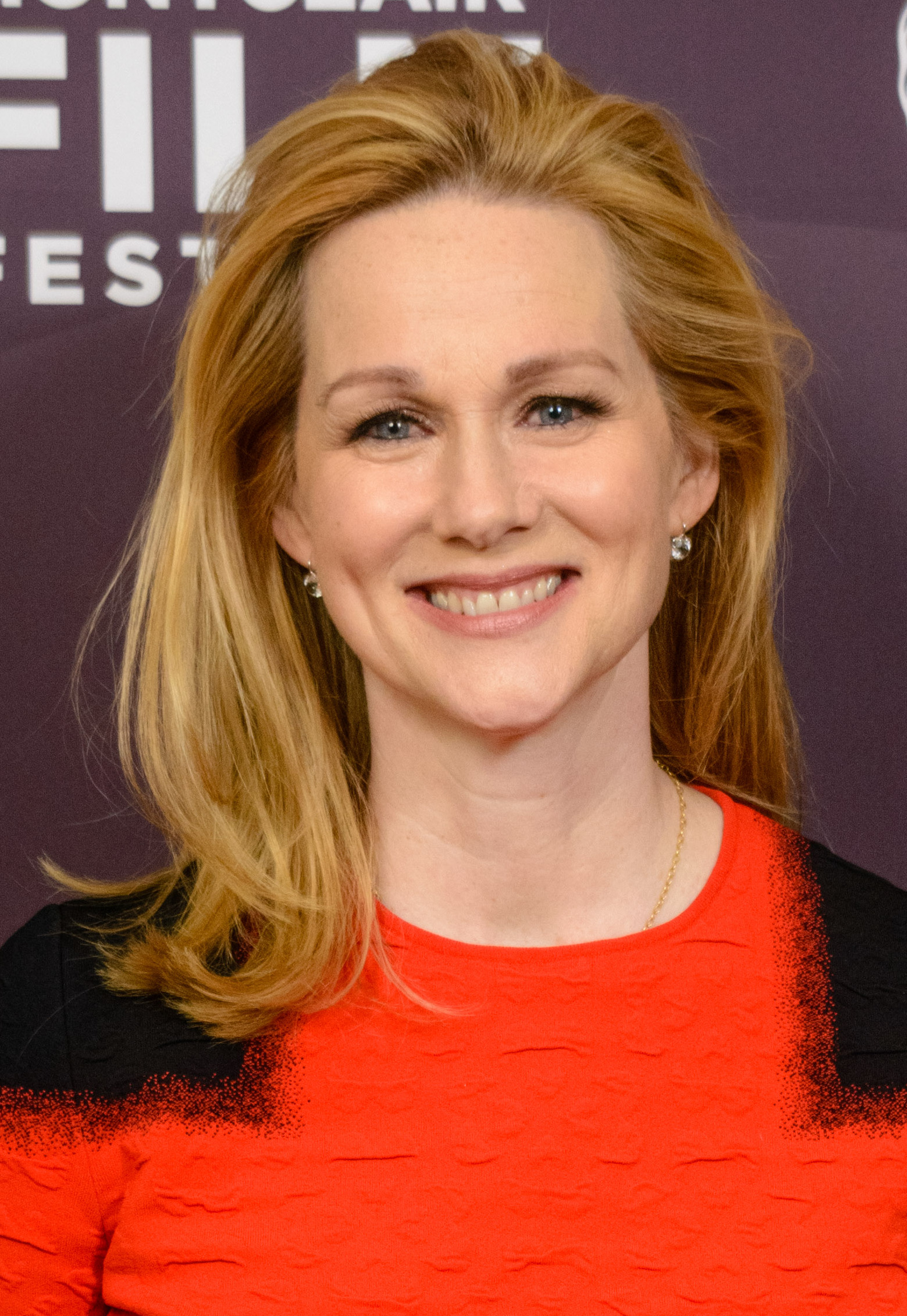
Linney at the Montclair Film Festival in 2016

Laura Linney is an American actress who has played roles in film, television and theater.

Linney started her film career with minor roles in Lorenzo's Oil (1992), Dave (1993), Primal Fear (1996), and Absolute Power (1997). She rose to prominence earning Academy Award nominations for You Can Count on Me (2000), Kinsey (2004) and The Savages (2007). She earned acclaim for her roles in The Truman Show (1998), Mystic River (2003), Love Actually and The Squid and the Whale (2005). Linney took supporting roles in films such as Man of the Year (2006), The Nanny Diaries (2007), Hyde Park on Hudson (2012), Mr. Holmes (2015), Genius (2016), and Sully (2016).

Linney is also known for her starring roles in television. She came to prominence for her role in the television film Wild Iris (2001) and for her role as Charlotte in the NBC sitcom Frasier (2004). For her portrayal as Abigail Adams in the HBO miniseries John Adams (2008) she received the Primetime Emmy Award for Outstanding Actress in a Limited Series or Movie. She earned stardom and acclaim for her leading roles as Cathy Jamison in the Showtime dark comedy series The Big C (2010–2013) and as Wendy Byrde in the Netflix crime drama series Ozark (2017–2022).

She made her Broadway debut in the play Six Degrees of Separation in 1992. She went on to receive five Tony Award for Best Actress in a Play nominations for her roles in Arthur Miller's The Crucible (2002), Donald Margulies Sight Unseen (2005), and Time Stands Still (2010), Lillian Hellman's The Little Foxes (2017), and Elizabeth Strout's My Name Is Lucy Barton (2020). She also acted in Les Liaisons Dangereuses (2008) and Summer, 1976 (2023).

== Film ==
Year	Title	Role	Notes
1992	Lorenzo's Oil	Young Teacher	
1993	Dave	Randi	
1993	Searching for Bobby Fischer	School Teacher	
1994	A Simple Twist of Fate	Nancy Lambert Newland	
1995	Congo	Karen Ross	
1996	Primal Fear	Janet Venable	
1997	Absolute Power	Kate Whitney	
1998	The Truman Show	Hannah Gill (Meryl Burbank)	
1999	Lush	Rachel Van Dyke	
2000	You Can Count on Me	Samantha "Sammy" Prescott	
2000	The House of Mirth	Bertha Dorset	
2000	Maze	Callie	
2002	The Laramie Project	Sherry Johnson	
2002	The Mothman Prophecies	Officer Connie Mills	
2003	The Life of David Gale	Constance Harraway	
2003	Mystic River	Annabeth Markum	
2003	Love Actually	Sarah	
2004	P.S.	Louise Harrington	
2004	Kinsey	Clara McMillen	
2005	The Squid and the Whale	Joan Berkman	
2005	The Exorcism of Emily Rose	Erin Bruner	
2006	Driving Lessons	Laura Marshall	
2006	Jindabyne	Claire	
2006	The Hottest State	Jesse	
2006	Man of the Year	Eleanor Green	
2007	The Savages	Wendy Savage	
2007	Breach	Kate Burroughs	
2007	The Nanny Diaries	Mrs. X	
2008	The Other Man	Lisa Ryman	
2009	The City of Your Final Destination	Caroline Gund	
2010	Sympathy for Delicious	Nina Hogue	
2010	Morning	Dr. Goodman	
2011	The Details	Lila	
2011	Arthur Christmas	North Pole Computer	Voice
2012	Hyde Park on Hudson	Margaret Suckley	
2013	Letters to Jackie: Remembering President Kennedy	Letter Reader	Documentary
2013	The Fifth Estate	Sarah Shaw	
2015	Mr. Holmes	Mrs. Munro	
2016	Genius	Louise Saunders	
2016	Teenage Mutant Ninja Turtles: Out of the Shadows	Chief Rebecca Vincent	
2016	Sully	Lorraine Sullenberger	
2016	Nocturnal Animals	Anne Sutton	
2017	The Dinner	Claire Lohman	
2020	Falling	Sarah Peterson	
2020	The Roads Not Taken	Rita	
2023	The Miracle Club	Chrissie Ahearn	
2023	Wildcat	Regina O'Connor	
2024	Suncoast	Kristine	
2026	Onwards and Sideways	Emma Dretzin	Completed
TBA	The Joy of Sex	Ruth Comfort	Filming

== Television ==
Year	Title	Role	Notes
1993	Class of '61	Lily Magraw	TV movie
1993	Blind Spot	Phoebe	TV movie
1993	Tales of the City	Mary Ann Singleton	Miniseries; 6 episodes
1994	Law & Order	Martha Bowen	Episode: "Blue Bamboo"
1998	More Tales of the City	Mary Ann Singleton	Miniseries; 6 episodes
1999	Love Letters	Melisa Gardner Cobb	TV movie
2000	Running Mates	Lauren Hartman	TV movie
2001	Further Tales of the City	Mary Ann Singleton	Miniseries; 4 episodes
2001	Wild Iris	Iris Bravard	TV movie
2002	Woodrow Wilson and the Birth of the American Century	Nellie Wilson	Voice; docuseries
2002	King of the Hill	Marlene	Voice; Episode: "Dang Ol' Love"
2002–2020	American Experience	Narrator/Carrie Chapman Catt	Voice; 4 episodes
2003–2004	Frasier	Mindy/Charlotte Connor	6 episodes
2006	American Dad!	Doctor Gupta	Voice; Episode: "Roger 'n' Me"
2008	John Adams	Abigail Adams	Miniseries; 7 episodes
2010–2013	The Big C	Cathy Jamison	40 episodes, also executive producer
2016	Inside Amy Schumer	Herself	Episode: "Brave"
2017	Red Nose Day Actually	Sarah	Television short film (Note: Not featured in original UK broadcast)
2017	Last Week Tonight with John Oliver	Florence Harding	Segment: "Harding"
2017	Sink Sank Sunk	Mitzi Mills	TV movie
2017–2022	Ozark	Wendy Byrde	44 episodes, also director
2018	BoJack Horseman	Herself	Voice; Episode: "The Dog Days Are Over"
2019	Portrait Artist of the Year	Herself	Episode: "Laura Linney"
2019	Tales of the City	Mary Ann Singleton	Main cast; 9 episodes
2020	Coronavirus, Explained	Narrator	Episode: "The Race for a Vaccine"
2022	The Last Movie Stars	Joanne Woodward	Voice; docuseries
2023	Pretty Baby: Brooke Shields	Herself	2 episodes
2025	The American Revolution	Sarah Logan Fisher, Sarah Morris Mifflin & others	Voice; docuseries
2026	American Classic	Kristen Forrest Bean	8 episodes
2026	Lanterns	Lianna	3 episodes

== Theatre ==
Year	Title	Role	Dates	Theatre
1990–1992	Six Degrees of Separation	Tess (understudy)	November 8, 1990 – January 5, 1992	Vivian Beaumont Theatre
1992	Sight Unseen	Grete	January 7, 1992- March 22, 1992	Orpheum Theatre
1992–1993	The Seagull	Nina Zarechnaya	November 29, 1992 – January 10, 1993	Lyceum Theatre
1994	Hedda Gabler	Thea Elvsted	July 10, 1994– August 7, 1994	Criterion Center Stage Right
1995–1996	Holiday	Linda Seton	December 3, 1995 – January 14, 1996	Circle in the Square Theatre
1998	Honour	Claudia	April 26, 1998 – June 14, 1998	Belasco Theatre
2000	Uncle Vanya	Yelena Andreyevna	April 30, 2000 – June 11, 2000	Brooks Atkinson Theatre
2002	The Crucible	Elizabeth Proctor	March 7, 2002 – June 9, 2002	Virginia Theatre
2004	Sight Unseen	Patricia	May 25, 2004 – July 25, 2004	Biltmore Theatre
2008	Les liaisons dangereuses	La Marquise de Merteuil	May 1, 2008 – July 6, 2008	American Airlines Theatre
2010–2011	Time Stands Still	Sarah Goodwin	January 28, 2010 – January 30, 2011	Cort Theatre
2017	The Little Foxes	Regina Giddens / Birdie Hubbard	April 19, 2017 – July 2, 2017	Samuel J. Friedman Theatre
2018	My Name Is Lucy Barton	Lucy Barton	June 2, 2018 – June 24, 2018	Bridge Theatre
2019	My Name Is Lucy Barton	Lucy Barton	January 23, 2019 – February 16, 2019	Bridge Theatre
2020	My Name Is Lucy Barton	Lucy Barton	January 4, 2020 – February 29, 2020	Samuel J. Friedman Theatre
2023	Summer, 1976	Diana	April 4, 2023 – June 10, 2023	Samuel J. Friedman Theatre
2024	Gutenberg! The Musical!	Producer	January 17, 2024	James Earl Jones Theatre
2027	Montauk	Roxy Margaux	TBA	Samuel J. Friedman Theatre
