= List of The New York Times number-one books of 2002 =

The American daily newspaper The New York Times publishes multiple weekly lists ranking the best selling books in the United States. The lists are split into three genres—fiction, nonfiction and children's books. Both the fiction and nonfiction lists are further split into multiple lists.

== Fiction ==
The following list ranks the number-one best selling fiction books, in the hardcover fiction category.

Date	Book	Author
January 6	Skipping Christmas	John Grisham
January 13	Skipping Christmas	John Grisham
January 20	One Door Away from Heaven	Dean Koontz
January 27	One Door Away from Heaven	Dean Koontz
February 3	Journey Through Heartsongs	Mattie Stepanek
February 10	Journey Through Heartsongs	Mattie Stepanek
February 17	The Diary of Ellen Rimbauer	Joyce Reardon
February 24	The Summons	John Grisham
March 3	The Summons	John Grisham
March 10	The Summons	John Grisham
March 17	The Summons	John Grisham
March 24	2nd Chance	James Patterson and Andrew Gross
March 31	2nd Chance	James Patterson and Andrew Gross
April 7	Everything's Eventual	Stephen King
April 14	Everything's Eventual	Stephen King
April 21	Three Fates	Nora Roberts
April 28	The Nanny Diaries	Emma McLaughlin and Nicola Kraus
May 5	Daddy's Little Girl	Mary Higgins Clark
May 12	Daddy's Little Girl	Mary Higgins Clark
May 19	The Shelters of Stone	Jean M. Auel
May 26	The Shelters of Stone	Jean M. Auel
June 2	The Shelters of Stone	Jean M. Auel
June 9	The Shelters of Stone	Jean M. Auel
June 16	In This Mountain	Jan Karon
June 23	In This Mountain	Jan Karon
June 30	The Beach House	James Patterson and Peter de Jonge
July 7	Hard Eight	Janet Evanovich
July 14	The Beach House	James Patterson and Peter de Jonge
July 21	The Remnant	Tim LaHaye and Jerry B. Jenkins
July 28	The Remnant	Tim LaHaye and Jerry B. Jenkins
August 4	The Remnant	Tim LaHaye and Jerry B. Jenkins
August 11	The Remnant	Tim LaHaye and Jerry B. Jenkins
August 18	The Lovely Bones	Alice Sebold
August 25	Red Rabbit	Tom Clancy
September 1	Red Rabbit	Tom Clancy
September 8	Red Rabbit	Tom Clancy
September 15	The Lovely Bones	Alice Sebold
September 22	The Lovely Bones	Alice Sebold
September 29	The Lovely Bones	Alice Sebold
October 6	Nights in Rodanthe	Nicholas Sparks
October 13	From a Buick 8	Stephen King
October 20	The Lovely Bones	Alice Sebold
October 27	The Lovely Bones	Alice Sebold
November 3	"Q" Is for Quarry	Sue Grafton
November 10	"Q" Is for Quarry	Sue Grafton
November 17	Answered Prayers	Danielle Steel
November 24	Chesapeake Blue	Nora Roberts
December 1	Chesapeake Blue	Nora Roberts
December 8	Four Blind Mice	James Patterson
December 15	Prey	Michael Crichton
December 22	Prey	Michael Crichton
December 29	Prey	Michael Crichton

== Nonfiction ==
The following list ranks the number-one best selling nonfiction books, in the hardcover nonfiction category.

Date	Book	Author
January 6	The No Spin Zone	Bill O'Reilly
January 13	John Adams	David McCullough
January 20	Bias	Bernard Goldberg
January 27	Bias	Bernard Goldberg
February 3	Bias	Bernard Goldberg
February 10	Bias	Bernard Goldberg
February 17	Bias	Bernard Goldberg
February 24	Shadow Warriors	Tom Clancy
March 3	Shadow Warriors	Tom Clancy
March 10	Bias	Bernard Goldberg
March 17	Bias	Bernard Goldberg
March 24	Stupid White Men	Michael Moore
March 31	Stupid White Men	Michael Moore
April 7	Stupid White Men	Michael Moore
April 14	Stupid White Men	Michael Moore
April 21	Lucky Man	Michael J. Fox
April 28	Lucky Man	Michael J. Fox
May 5	Lucky Man	Michael J. Fox
May 12	Lucky Man	Michael J. Fox
May 19	Master of the Senate	Robert A. Caro
May 26	Lucky Man	Michael J. Fox
June 2	American Son	Richard Blow
June 9	A Mind at a Time	Mel Levine
June 16	The Right Words at the Right Time	Marlo Thomas
June 23	Stupid White Men	Michael Moore
June 30	You Cannot Be Serious	John McEnroe with James Kaplan
July 7	You Cannot Be Serious	John McEnroe with James Kaplan
July 14	Slander	Ann Coulter
July 21	Slander	Ann Coulter
July 28	Slander	Ann Coulter
August 4	Slander	Ann Coulter
August 11	Slander	Ann Coulter
August 18	Slander	Ann Coulter
August 25	Slander	Ann Coulter
September 1	Slander	Ann Coulter
September 8	Let's Roll!	Lisa Beamer with Ken Abraham
September 15	Let's Roll!	Lisa Beamer with Ken Abraham
September 22	Let's Roll!	Lisa Beamer with Ken Abraham
September 29	Let's Roll!	Lisa Beamer with Ken Abraham
October 6	Let's Roll!	Lisa Beamer with Ken Abraham
October 13	Let's Roll!	Lisa Beamer with Ken Abraham
October 20	Leadership	Rudy Giuliani with Ken Kurson
October 27	Leadership	Rudy Giuliani with Ken Kurson
November 3	Leadership	Rudy Giuliani with Ken Kurson
November 10	Leadership	Rudy Giuliani with Ken Kurson
November 17	Leadership	Rudy Giuliani with Ken Kurson
November 24	Journals	Kurt Cobain
December 1	Portrait of a Killer	Patricia Cornwell
December 8	Portrait of a Killer	Patricia Cornwell
December 15	Bush at War	Bob Woodward
December 22	Bush at War	Bob Woodward
December 29	Bush at War	Bob Woodward

== See also ==
- Publishers Weekly list of bestselling novels in the United States in the 2000s
