= List of awards and nominations received by Laura Linney =

Laura Linney awards and nominations
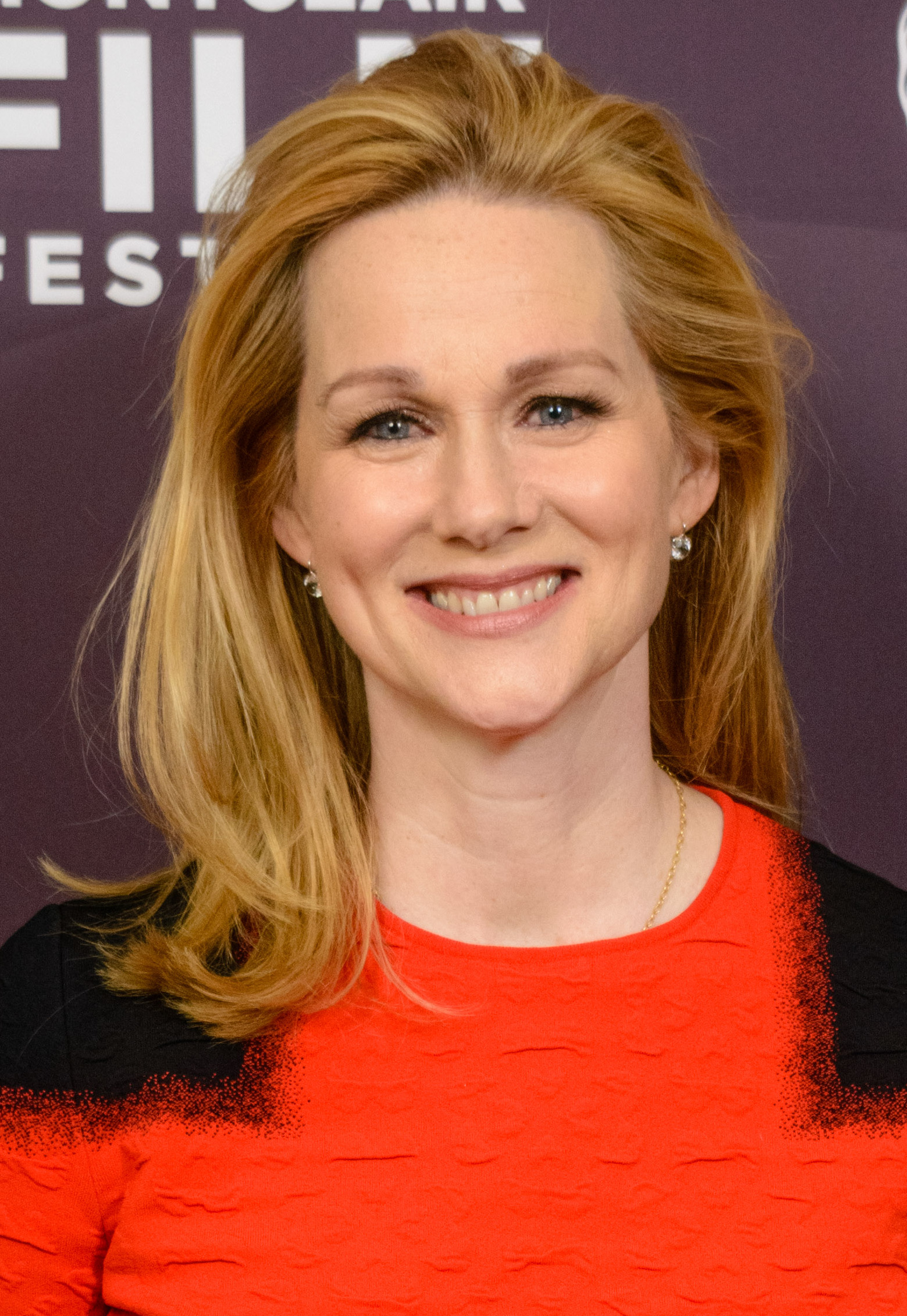
- Linney in 2016
Awards and nominations
Award	Wins	Nominations
Academy Awards	0	3
BAFTA Awards	0	1
Critics' Choice Awards	0	4
Golden Globe Awards	2	8
Independent Spirit Awards	0	2
Primetime Emmy Awards	4	9
Screen Actors Guild Awards	1	11
Tony Awards	0	5

This article is a List of awards and nominations received by Laura Linney

Laura Linney is an American actress known for roles in film, television, and stage. She has received numerous accolades four Primetime Emmy Awards, two Golden Globe Awards, and a Screen Actors Guild Award as well as nominations for three Academy Awards, a British Academy Film Awards, four Critics' Choice Awards, two Independent Spirit Awards, and five Tony Awards.

She has been the recipient of three Academy Award nominations for her performances in Kenneth Lonergan's You Can Count on Me (2000), Bill Condon's Kinsey (2004), and Tamara Jenkins' Savages (2007). She has also received a British Academy Film Award nomination for Best Supporting Actress for her performance in Clint Eastwood's Mystic River (2003). She also received eight Golden Globe Award nominations, winning twice, and nine Screen Actors Guild Awards winning once. She has also received two Independent Spirit Awards.

For her work on television she received nine Primetime Emmy Award nominations winning four awards for her performances in Wild Iris (2002), Frasier (2004), John Adams (2008), The Big C: Hereafter (2013). For her work on the Broadway stage she has earned five nominations for Best Actress in a Play for her performances in Arthur Miller's The Crucible in 2002, Donald Margulies's Sight Unseen in 2005, and Time Stands Still in 2010, Lillian Hellman's The Little Foxes in 2017, and Elizabeth Strout's My Name Is Lucy Barton in 2020.

== Major associations ==
=== Academy Awards ===
Year	Category	Nominated work	Result	Ref.
2001	Best Actress	You Can Count on Me	Nominated	
2005	Best Supporting Actress	Kinsey	Nominated	
2008	Best Actress	The Savages	Nominated	

=== BAFTA Awards ===
Year	Category	Nominated work	Result	Ref.
2004	Best Film Actress in a Supporting Role	Mystic River	Nominated	

=== Critics' Choice Awards ===
Year	Category	Nominated work	Result	Ref.
Critics' Choice Movie Awards
2000	Best Actress	You Can Count on Me	Nominated	
2004	Best Supporting Actress	Kinsey	Nominated	
Critics' Choice Television Awards
2021	Best Actress in a Drama Series	Ozark	Nominated	
2023	Best Actress in a Drama Series	Ozark	Nominated	

=== Emmy Awards ===
Year	Category	Nominated work	Result	Ref.
Primetime Emmy Awards
2002	Outstanding Lead Actress in a Miniseries or a Movie	Wild Iris	Won	
2004	Outstanding Guest Actress in a Comedy Series	Frasier	Won	
2008	Outstanding Lead Actress in a Miniseries or a Movie	John Adams	Won	
2011	Outstanding Lead Actress in a Comedy Series	The Big C (episode: "Pilot")	Nominated	
2013	Outstanding Lead Actress in a Miniseries or a Movie	The Big C: Hereafter	Won	
2019	Outstanding Lead Actress in a Drama Series	Ozark (episode: "One Way Out")	Nominated	
2020	Outstanding Lead Actress in a Drama Series	Ozark (episode: "Fire Pink")	Nominated	
2022	Outstanding Lead Actress in a Drama Series	Ozark (episode: "Pound of Flesh and Still Kickin")	Nominated	
2022	Outstanding Drama Series	Ozark (season 4)	Nominated	

=== Golden Globe Awards ===
Year	Category	Nominated work	Result	Ref.
2001	Best Actress in a Motion Picture – Drama	You Can Count on Me	Nominated	
2005	Best Supporting Actress – Motion Picture	Kinsey	Nominated	
2006	Best Actress in a Motion Picture – Musical or Comedy	The Squid and the Whale	Nominated	
2009	Best Actress in a Miniseries or Television Film	John Adams	Won	
2011	Best Actress in a Television Series – Musical or Comedy	The Big C	Won	
2012	Best Actress in a Television Series – Musical or Comedy	The Big C	Nominated	
2021	Best Actress – Television Series Drama	Ozark	Nominated	
2023	Best Actress – Television Series Drama	Ozark	Nominated	

=== Independent Spirit Awards ===
Year	Category	Nominated work	Result	Ref.
2001	Best Female Lead	You Can Count on Me	Nominated	
2006	Best Female Lead	The Squid and the Whale	Nominated	

=== Screen Actors Guild Awards ===
Year	Category	Nominated work	Result	Ref.
2001	Outstanding Female Actor in a Leading Role	You Can Count on Me	Nominated	
2004	Outstanding Ensemble Cast in a Motion Picture	Mystic River	Nominated	
2005	Outstanding Female Actor in a Supporting Role	Kinsey	Nominated	
2009	Outstanding Female Actor in a Miniseries or TV Movie	John Adams	Won	
2018	Outstanding Female Actor in a Drama Series	Ozark (season 1)	Nominated	
2019	Outstanding Female Actor in a Drama Series	Ozark (season 2)	Nominated	
2019	Outstanding Ensemble in a Drama Series	Ozark (season 2)	Nominated	
2021	Outstanding Female Actor in a Drama Series	Ozark (season 3)	Nominated	
2021	Outstanding Ensemble in a Drama Series	Ozark (season 3)	Nominated	
2023	Outstanding Female Actor in a Drama Series	Ozark (season 4)	Nominated	
2023	Outstanding Ensemble in a Drama Series	Ozark (season 4)	Nominated	

=== Tony Awards ===
Year	Category	Nominated work	Result	Ref.
2002	Tony Award for Best Actress in a Play	The Crucible	Nominated	
2005	Tony Award for Best Actress in a Play	Sight Unseen	Nominated	
2010	Tony Award for Best Actress in a Play	Time Stands Still	Nominated	
2017	Tony Award for Best Actress in a Play	The Little Foxes	Nominated	
2020	Tony Award for Best Actress in a Play	My Name Is Lucy Barton	Nominated	

== Theatre awards ==
Organizations	Year	Category	Work	Result	Ref.
Drama Desk Awards	1992	Outstanding Featured Actress in a Play	Sight Unseen	Nominated	
Drama Desk Awards	2005	Outstanding Leading Actress in a Play	Sight Unseen	Nominated	
Drama Desk Awards	2010	Outstanding Leading Actress in a Play	Time Stands Still	Nominated	
Drama Desk Awards	2017	Outstanding Leading Actress in a Play	The Little Foxes	Won	
Drama Desk Awards	2020	Outstanding Solo Performance	My Name Is Lucy Barton	Won	
Evening Standard Theatre Awards	2018	Best Actress	My Name Is Lucy Barton	Nominated	
Outer Critics Circle Awards	2002	Outstanding Lead Actress in a Play	The Crucible	Nominated	
Outer Critics Circle Awards	2005	Outstanding Lead Actress in a Play	Sight Unseen	Nominated	
Outer Critics Circle Awards	2010	Outstanding Lead Actress in a Play	Time Stands Still	Nominated	
Outer Critics Circle Awards	2017	Outstanding Lead Actress in a Play	The Little Foxes	Won	
Outer Critics Circle Awards	2020	Outstanding Solo Performance	My Name Is Lucy Barton	Won	
Theatre World Awards	1992	Theatre World Award	Sight Unseen	Won	

== Critic associations ==
Organizations	Year	Category	Work	Result	Ref.
Boston Society of Film Critics	2000	Best Actress	You Can Count on Me	Nominated	
Boston Society of Film Critics	2003	Best Cast	Mystic River	Won	
Chicago Film Critics Association	2001	Best Actress	You Can Count on Me	Nominated	
Chicago Film Critics Association	2007	Best Actress	The Savages	Nominated	
Film Critics Circle of Australia Awards	2006	Best Actress in a Leading Role	Jindabyne	Nominated	
London Film Critics Circle	2006	Best Actress	Kinsey	Nominated	
London Film Critics Circle	2008	Best Actress	The Savages	Nominated	
Los Angeles Film Critics Association	2000	Best Actress	You Can Count on Me	Nominated	
National Society of Film Critics	2001	Best Actress	You Can Count on Me	Won	
National Society of Film Critics	2005	Best Supporting Actress	Kinsey	Nominated	
New York Film Critics Circle	2000	Best Actress	You Can Count on Me	Won	

== Miscellaneous awards ==
Organizations	Year	Category	Work	Result	Ref.
AACTA Awards	2006	Best Lead Actress – Cinema	Jindabyne	Nominated	
Gotham Awards	2005	Best Film Ensemble Cast	The Squid and the Whale	Won	
Gotham Awards	2007	Best Film Ensemble Cast	The Savages	Nominated	
Gracie Allen Awards	2009	Outstanding TV Female Lead – Drama Special	John Adams	Won	
National Board of Review	2004	Best Supporting Actress	Kinsey	Won	
Satellite Awards	2001	Best Actress in a Film	You Can Count on Me	Nominated	
Satellite Awards	2002	Best Actress in a Miniseries or Television Film	Wild Iris	Nominated	
Satellite Awards	2005	Best Actress in a Film	P.S.	Nominated	
Satellite Awards	2005	Best Supporting Actress in a Film	Kinsey	Nominated	
Satellite Awards	2005	Best Supporting Actress in a Film	The Squid and the Whale	Won	
Satellite Awards	2007	Best Actress in a Film	The Savages	Nominated	
Satellite Awards	2008	Best Actress in a Miniseries or Television Film	John Adams	Nominated	
Satellite Awards	2010	Best Actress in a Comedy or Musical Television Series	The Big C	Won	
Satellite Awards	2011	Best Actress in a Comedy or Musical Television Series	The Big C	Nominated	
Satellite Awards	2012	Best Actress in a Film	Hyde Park on Hudson	Nominated	
Satellite Awards	2014	Best Actress in a Miniseries or Television Film	The Big C: Hereafter	Nominated	
Satellite Awards	2021	Best Actress in a Drama Television Series	Ozark	Nominated	
Satellite Awards	2023	Best Actress in a Drama Television Series	Ozark	Nominated	
Saturn Awards	2006	Best Film Lead Actress	The Exorcism of Emily Rose	Nominated	
Webby Awards	2018	Best Actress	Ozark	Won	
Katharine Hepburn Cultural Arts Center	2024	Spirit of Katharine Hepburn Award		Received	
