= Dog Train =

Dog Train may refer to

- "Dog Train", a song by the Levellers
- Dog Train, a musical album produced by Sandra Boynton
  - "Dog Train", a song by Blues Traveler, on the Boynton album
