= The Bacon Brothers =

American band

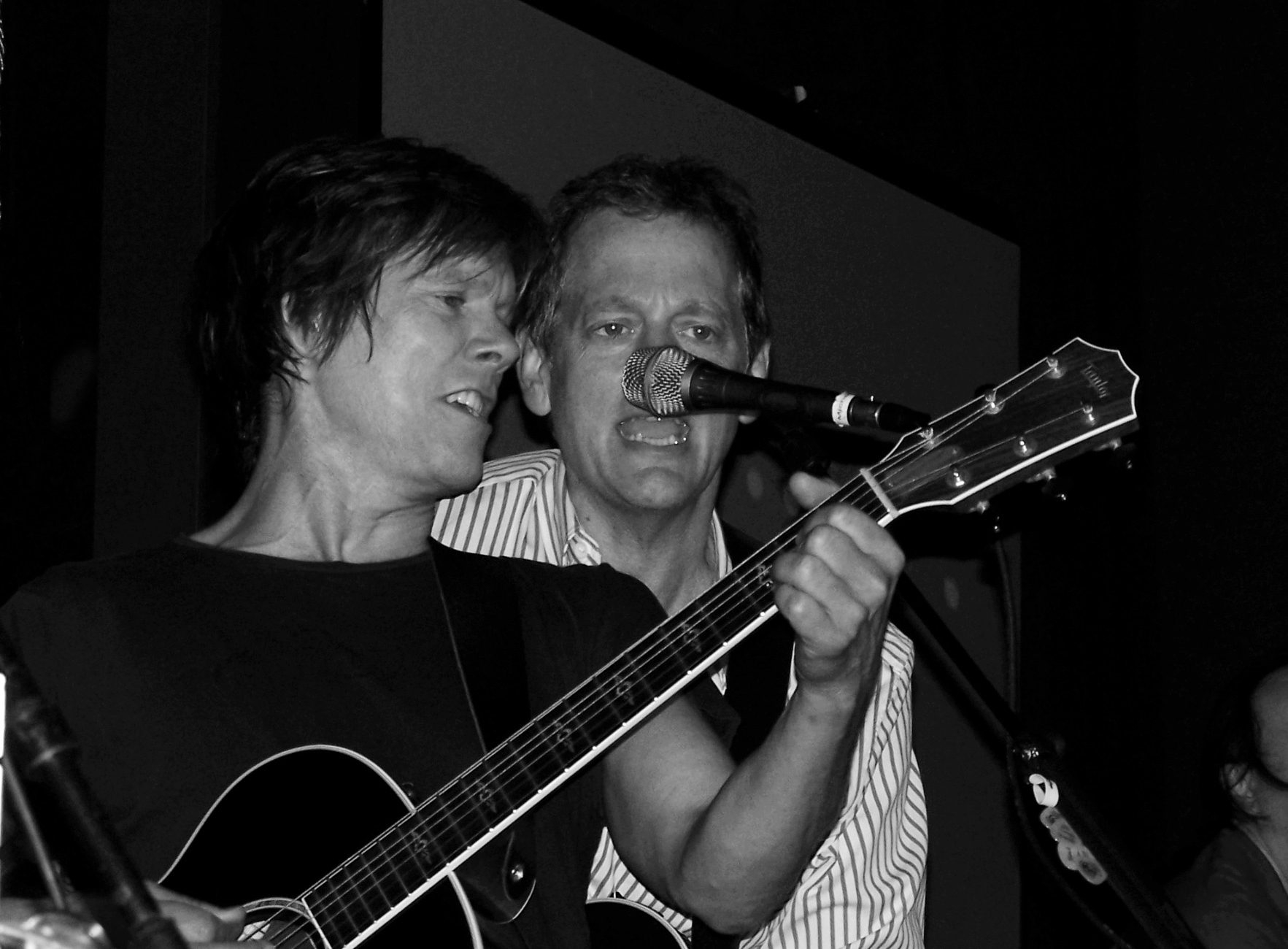
- The Bacon Brothers performing live in NYC in 2006

Background information
- Origin: United States
- Genres: Country rock Folk rock
- Years active: 1995–present
- Members: Kevin Bacon; Michael Bacon; Paul Guzzone; Tim Quick; Joe Mennonna; Frank Vilard
- Past members: Ira Siegel

The Bacon Brothers is an American music duo consisting of brothers Michael Bacon and Kevin Bacon.

== Formation and first album ==
Although they have played music together since they were boys, the brothers have only been a working band since 1994. Having heard the brothers' music, a childhood friend approached them about doing a one night only gig in their hometown of Philadelphia at the Theatre of Living Arts under the moniker The Bacon Brothers. Since then, the band has gone on to release seven studio albums, appear on numerous radio, television, and web programs, and on many tours throughout North America and Europe. The brother's first studio release in 1997 was entitled Forosoco, derived from what the brothers describe their genre to be as a mix of folk, rock, soul, and country.

== Appearances on soundtracks ==
The Bacon Brothers also appear on Sandra Boynton's children's CDs Dog Train, and Philadelphia Chickens, on which they sing the title track. Their song "Chop Wood (Carry Water)" is on the soundtrack of the 2004 film The Woodsman, which Kevin produced and starred in. Their song "When You Decide You've Stayed Too Long" is on the soundtrack of the 2003 film Red Betsy. Kevin starred in and produced Loverboy with his wife Kyra Sedgwick, which Michael also scored.

== Television ==
In January 2006, the Bacon Brothers appeared on an episode of Queer Eye for the Straight Guy. The episode featured Michael Bacon as the episode's "straight guy" and makeover recipient, and ended with both Bacon Brothers performing. In 2008, Michael composed many soundtracks for television, including the soundtrack for the PBS mini series The Jewish Americans and The Kennedys for which he won an Emmy.

In February 2009, the Bacon Brothers were the special guests for Episode 16 of Live from Daryl's House, Daryl Hall's (of Hall & Oates fame) monthly free internet concert. They performed four tracks off their most recent album, as well as some cover songs and the Hall & Oates track "When the Morning Comes".

In April 2009 they recorded "Private Sessions" which aired on the A&E channel. A new single, "Guilty of the Crime", a duet with The Bellamy Brothers, was released in June 2009.

== 2009 tours ==
On June 27, 2009, The Bacon Brothers gave a brief concert, for the fundraisers who climbed to the top of Pikes Peak, Colorado, in support of the Love Hope Strength Foundation. The event was videoed by Matt Carpenter, high altitude marathoner and posted on their Myspace page. Later that night, The Bacon Brothers played a concert at the Denver Hard Rock Cafe. Also playing were Cy Curnin of The Fixx, and The White Buffalo.

The Bacon Brothers toured throughout the US East Coast during the summer of 2009 promoting their fifth studio album New Years Day released November 2008. During that tour, the band was a headliner for the WXPN Xpotential Music Festival in Camden, New Jersey. The festival performance featured an appearance from musicians from the Mummers to perform the title track of the record.

== 2014 album ==
The next studio album, entitled 36¢, was released on September 16, 2014, after an extensive summer of touring throughout North America. The title song of the album was penned by Michael. "Get a Little", the fourth song of the album written by Kevin was originally written with the intention of being sung by a young country singer but was ultimately left to be performed by the band. The album also features an unplugged version of the Alanis Morissette song "You Learn" and the version of "Above the Clouds" recorded from the band's Live from Daryl's House segment from 2009, featuring Tom Wolk on guitar.

== 2018 ==
On June 1, 2018, the band released its self-titled album, marking the band's seventh studio release and was produced by former Saturday Night Live musical director, G.E. Smith. The first track on the album, "Tom Petty T-Shirt", hit #8 on iTunes and Spotify, in addition to receiving airplay on Tom Petty Radio on SiriusXM. The song was originally nationally debuted on April 26, 2018, on The Tonight Show Starring Jimmy Fallon. The tracks "I Feel You" and "Broken Glass" feature background vocals from Kevin's wife, Kyra Sedgwick and their daughter, actress Sosie Bacon. Sosie was also featured in the band's music video for "Broken Glass". "Beneath Perfection", the eighth track of the record was written by Kevin while filming the cult classic Tremors, which was originally named Beneath Perfection. The final track, "Boys in Bars" originally featured on the band's first studio record Forosoco, was re-recorded at Lehman College Studios in 2016, where Michael Bacon currently teaches as an associate professor in the Music program.

== Band members ==
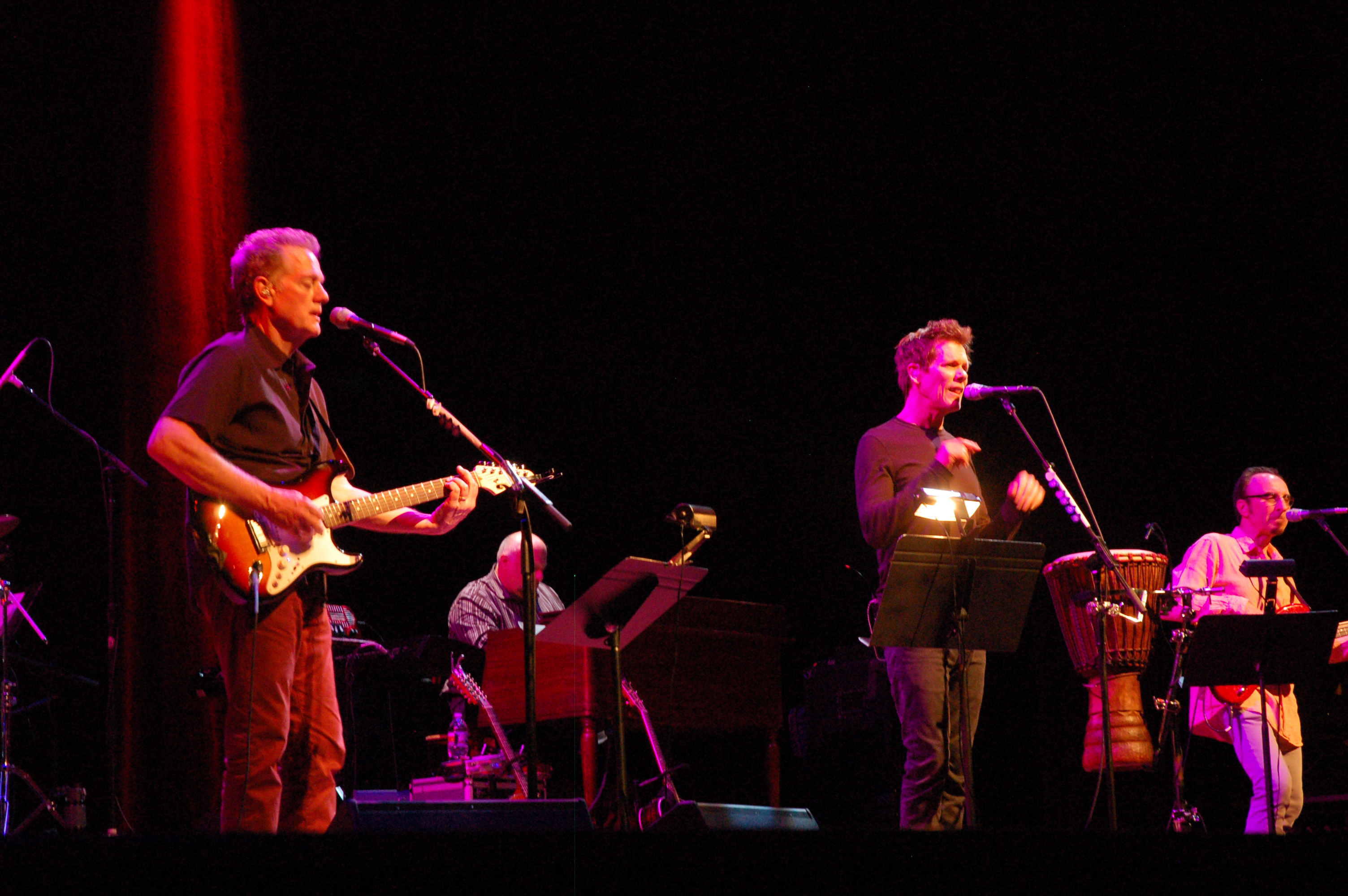
The Bacon Brothers, Michael (left, vocals) and Kevin (right), performing at George Washington University in 2014

Current members

- Kevin Bacon - lead vocal, guitar, harmonica, percussion (1995–present)
- Michael Bacon - lead vocal, guitar, cello (1995–present)
- Paul Guzzone - bass, electric guitars, programming, background vocals (1995–present)
- Tim Quick - lead guitar, mandolin, background vocals (2018–present)
- Joe Mennonna - acoustic piano, electric piano, hammond organ, keyboards, accordion, trumpet (1995–present)
- Frank Vilardi - drums, percussion (1995–present)

Former members

- Ira Siegel - (electric guitars, acoustic guitars, mandolin, background vocals) (1999–2018)
- Marshal Rosenberg - (percussion) (1994–2004)

== Discography ==
Albums

- Forosoco (1997, November 4 - Special edition 2003)
- Getting There (1999, August 31 - Special edition 2003)
- Can't Complain (2001, June 26)
- White Knuckles (2005, October 25)
- New Year's Day (2009, March 24 - Promo version 2008, November 11)
- 36¢ (2014, September 16)
- The Bacon Brothers (2018, April 25)
- The Way We Love (2020, July 17)
- Erato (2022, July 8)
- Ballad Of The Brothers (2024)

Singles

- New Year's Day
- New Year's Day featuring The Mummers All-Star Band and Bunny Sigler
- Two singles from 36¢: 36 Cents and Wonderful Day
- Five singles from The Bacon Brothers: Boys In Bars 2016, Driver, Broken Glass, Two Rivers and Tom Petty T-Shirt
- Four singles from The Way We Love: Play!, She-Zee-Zee (Easy on My Eyes), The Way We Love and Corona Tune

Compilation

- Philadelphia Road-Best of (2011, July 31), with new song Guilty of Crime featuring The Bellamy Brothers

DVD

- Live: The No Food Jokes Tour (2003, November 11)

Appearances

- "Philadelphia Chickens" and "Snoozers" on Philadelphia Chickens by Sandra Boynton and Michael Ford (2002)
- "Footloose" on Will & Grace-Let The Music Out (2004)
- "You Know My Brother (He's So Heavy)" on Marlo Thomas and Friends: Thanks & Giving All Year Long by Marlo Thomas (2004)
- "Pots and Pans" on Dog Train by Sandra Boynton (2005)
- "36 Cents", featuring Kristin Ash, on Bellamy Brothers & Friends: Across the Sea by The Bellamy Brothers (2013)
- Television advertisement Wake Up to Eggs with the Bacon Brothers (2016)
- YouTube video Staying Home, parody of Going Home by The Rolling Stones (2020)
- "Legacy of Pain" on Down Yonder by Vaneese Thomas (only Kevin, 2019)
