= Laura Linney =

American actress (born 1964)

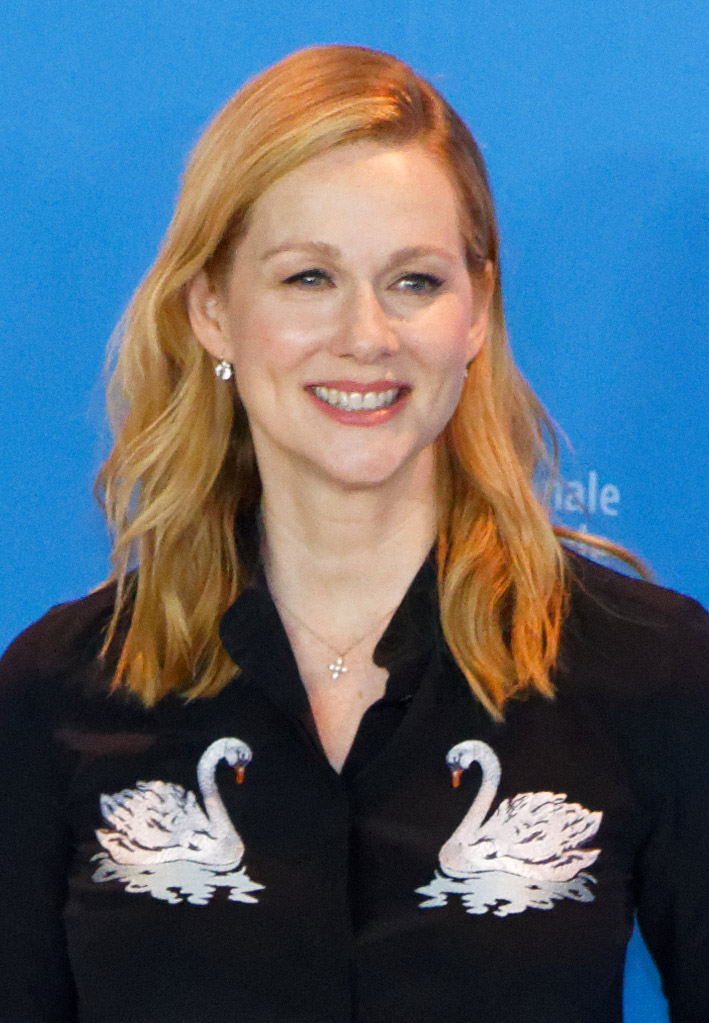
- Linney in 2017
- Born: Laura Leggett Linney; February 5, 1964 (age 62); New York City, U.S.
- Education: Northwestern University; Brown University (BA); Juilliard School (GrDip)
- Occupation: Actress
- Years active: 1990–present
- Notable work: Full list
- Spouses: David Adkins (m. 1995; div. 2000); Marc Schauer (m. 2009)
- Children: 1
- Father: Romulus Linney
- Relatives: Romulus Zachariah Linney (great-great-grandfather)
- Awards: Full list

Laura Leggett Linney (born February 5, 1964) is an American actress and director. She is the recipient of several awards, including four Primetime Emmy Awards, two Golden Globe Awards, and a Screen Actors Guild Award, in addition to nominations for three Academy Awards, five Tony Awards, and a BAFTA.

Linney made her Broadway debut in 1990 before receiving Tony Award nominations for the 2002 revival of The Crucible, the original Broadway productions of Sight Unseen (2004), Time Stands Still (2010), My Name Is Lucy Barton (2020), and the 2017 revival of The Little Foxes. On television, she won her first Emmy Award for the television film Wild Iris (2001), and had subsequent wins for the sitcom Frasier (2003–2004) and the miniseries John Adams (2008). From 2010 to 2013, she starred in the Showtime series The Big C, which won her a fourth Emmy in 2013, and from 2017 to 2022 she starred in the Netflix crime series Ozark.

As a film actress, Linney debuted with a minor role in Lorenzo's Oil (1992) and went on to receive Academy Award nominations for the dramas You Can Count on Me (2000), Kinsey (2004), and The Savages (2007). She is also known for her performances in Congo (1995), Primal Fear (1996), The Truman Show (1998), Mystic River and Love Actually (both 2003), The Squid and the Whale (2005), The Nanny Diaries (2007), Hyde Park on Hudson (2012), Mr. Holmes (2015), Sully and Nocturnal Animals (both 2016).

== Early life and education ==
Linney was born February 5, 1964, in Manhattan, New York City. Her mother, Miriam Anderson "Ann" Perse (née Leggett), was a nurse at the Memorial Sloan Kettering Cancer Center, and her father, Romulus Zachariah Linney IV, was a playwright and professor. Linney spent summers with her father in New Hampshire and fell in love with the stage, working with the local theatre group beginning at the age of eleven. Linney's paternal great-great-grandfather was Republican U.S. Congressman Romulus Zachariah Linney. She has a half-sister named Susan from her father's second marriage.

Linney is a 1982 graduate of Northfield Mount Hermon School, a preparatory school in Massachusetts (which she serves as the chair of the Arts Advisory Council). She then attended Northwestern University before transferring to Brown University, where she studied acting with Jim Barnhill and John Emigh and served on the board of Production Workshop, the university's student theater group. During her senior year at Brown, she performed in one of her father's plays as Lady Ada Lovelace in a production of Childe Byron, a drama in which the poet Lord Byron mends a taut, distant relationship with his daughter Ada.

Linney graduated from Brown in 1986 and went on to study acting at the Juilliard School as a member of Group 19 (1986–90), which also included Jeanne Tripplehorn and Tim Blake Nelson. In 2003, Linney received an honorary doctor of fine arts degree from Brown. She received an honorary doctor of fine arts degree from Juilliard when she delivered the school's commencement address in 2009.

== Career ==
=== 1990s ===
Linney made her New York stage debut in 1990 as Nina in the Off Broadway adaptation of The Seagull set in the Hamptons. Conceived and directed by Jeff Cohen, the production was mounted at the RAPP Arts Center in Alphabet City to great critical acclaim. The New York Times wrote: "Best of all is Miss Linney's Nina. From a naive, idealistic artist's groupie with a streak of crazy determination, her Nina emerges as a woman who is a lot stronger and more complicated than the terminally wounded bird-woman that is the character's traditional interpretation. Though deeply embittered at the end of the play, she is also fortified by a hard-won self-knowledge. Miss Linney projects the character's ambiguities with stinging force and clarity. She is clearly a talent of enormous potential."

Linney first appeared in minor roles in a few early 1990s films, including Lorenzo's Oil (1992), Searching for Bobby Fischer (1993), and Dave (1993). In 1993, Linney starred in the television adaptation of Armistead Maupin's Tales of the City as Mary Ann Singleton. She returned as Mary Ann Singleton in 1998 in More Tales of the City. In October 1994, Linney guest-starred in an episode of Law & Order (episode "Blue Bamboo") as Martha Bowen. She played a blonde American singer who successfully claimed "battered woman syndrome" as a defense to the murder of a Japanese businessman.

Throughout the 1990s, Linney appeared on stage on Broadway and elsewhere including in Hedda Gabler, for which she won the 1994 Joe A. Callaway Award, and a revival of Holiday in December 1995 through January 1996 (the Philip Barry play upon which the 1938 movie starring Cary Grant and Katharine Hepburn was based).

She was then cast in a series of thrillers, including Congo (1995), Primal Fear (1996) and Absolute Power (1997). She made her Hollywood breakthrough in 1998, praised for playing Jim Carrey's on-screen wife Meryl Burbank in Peter Weir's science-fiction comedy drama film The Truman Show.

=== 2000s ===
In 2000, she starred in Kenneth Lonergan's film You Can Count on Me alongside Mark Ruffalo and Matthew Broderick. The film was met with positive reviews from critics with an approval rating of 95% on Rotten Tomatoes. Linney was nominated for an Academy Award for Best Actress for her performance as the small-town single mother Sammy Prescott. In 2001, she reprised her role as Mary Ann Singleton in Further Tales of the City. In 2002, she starred in Wild Iris alongside Gena Rowlands and won her first Emmy Award for Outstanding Lead Actress in a Miniseries or a Movie.

In 2002, she starred in the Broadway revival of The Crucible alongside Liam Neeson at the Virginia Theatre, which ran from March 2002 through June 2002. She received a Best Actress Tony Award nomination for her performance as John Proctor's prudish wife Elizabeth. Also in 2002, Linney appeared on Sandra Boynton's children's CD Philadelphia Chickens alongside Meryl Streep, Kevin Kline and Patti LuPone. Linney sings the song "Please Can I Keep It?".

In 2003, Linney appeared in Clint Eastwood's Mystic River alongside Sean Penn, Tim Robbins and Marcia Gay Harden. The film received an 89% on Rotten Tomatoes. Linney received a BAFTA Award nomination for her performance as Annabeth Markum, the devoted second wife to Sean Penn's grief-stricken and revengeful character. That same year she also starred in the holiday film Love Actually alongside Hugh Grant, Emma Thompson, Alan Rickman, Colin Firth, and Liam Neeson. She also appeared in Alan Parker's The Life of David Gale (2003) alongside Kate Winslet and Kevin Spacey.

In 2004, she reunited with her Love Actually co-star Liam Neeson in Kinsey, as the title character's wife. She was nominated for the Academy Award for Best Supporting Actress, Screen Actors Guild Award, and Golden Globe Award. That same year Linney had a recurring role in the comedy series Frasier as Charlotte, the final love interest of Frasier Crane (Kelsey Grammer) during the 1993–2004 series. She won her second Primetime Emmy Award for Guest Actress in a Comedy Series. Also in 2004, she starred in the Broadway production of Sight Unseen at the Biltmore Theatre which ran from May 2004 through July 2004. She earned her second Tony Award nomination for her performance.

In 2005, Linney starred in Noah Baumbach's comedy-drama The Squid and the Whale alongside Jeff Daniels and Jesse Eisenberg. It received rave reviews from critics earning a 92% on Rotten Tomatoes. She received a Golden Globe Award nomination for her performance. Linney appeared in the political satire Man of the Year (2006) alongside Robin Williams and the comedy-drama The Nanny Diaries opposite Scarlett Johansson and Chris Evans, based on the book by Emma McLaughlin and Nicola Kraus.

In 2006, Linney played as Maria Jacobsen for the 2006 television documentary film The Armenian Genocide, broadcast by PBS to spread awareness of the killing of one million Armenians during World War I.

Also in 2006 Linney played the role of Claire in the Australian movie Jindabyne, alongside Gabriel Byrne. It was shot on location in the town of the same name in southwest New South Wales.

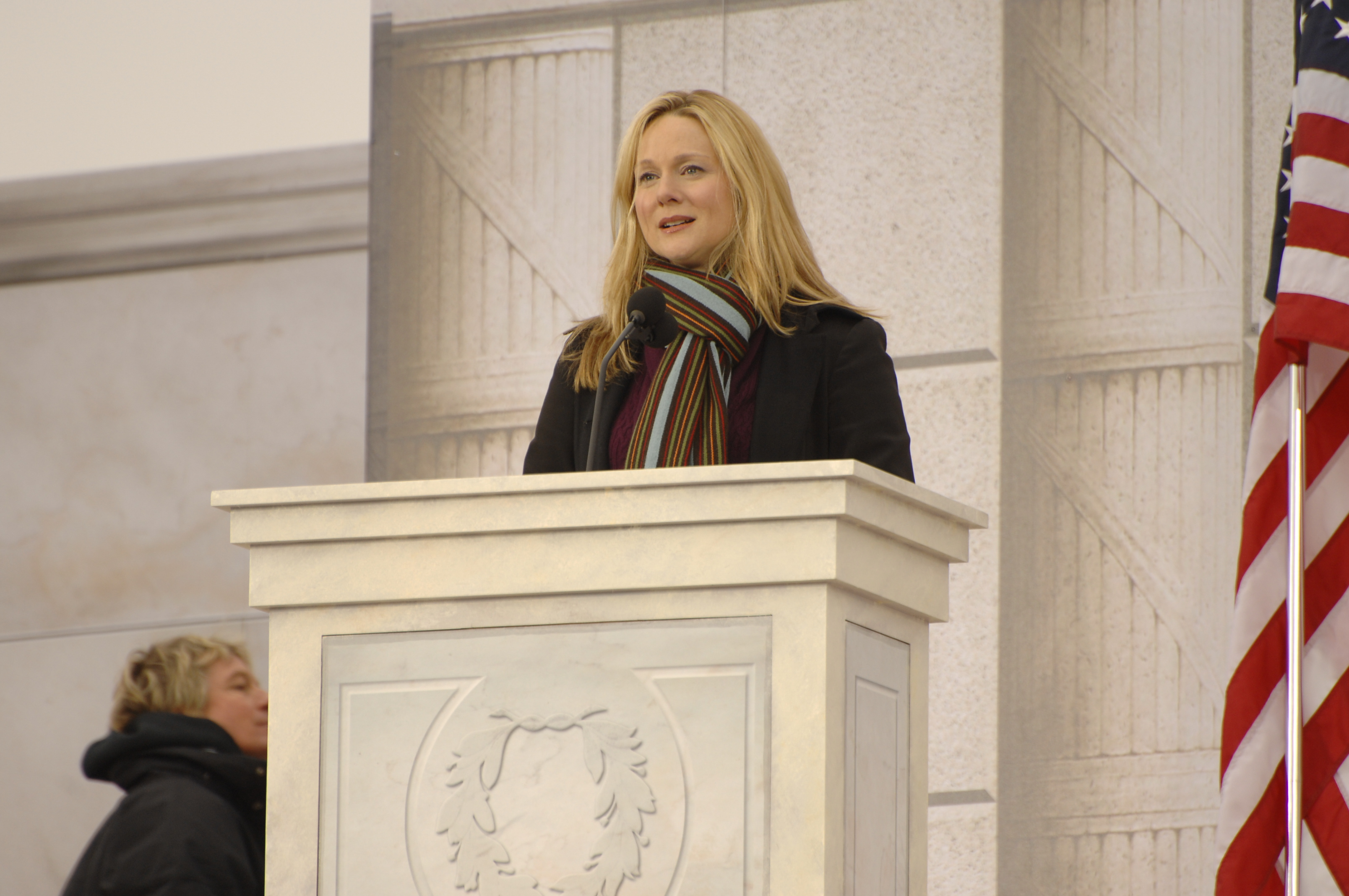
Linney at the 2009 inauguration of President Barack Obama

In 2007, Linney also appeared in Tamara Jenkins's The Savages with Philip Seymour Hoffman as Wendy Savage, a struggling playwright. She received a third Academy Award nomination for her performance.

In 2008, Linney starred as Abigail Adams in the HBO miniseries John Adams directed by Tom Hooper (The King's Speech, Les Misérables). Paul Giamatti played John Adams. The series was a critical and awards season hit and won 13 Primetime Emmy Awards overtaking Angels in America (11 wins) as the miniseries with the most Emmy wins in history. She won her third Primetime Emmy Award for her performance. Also in 2008, she starred as La Marquise de Merteuil in the Broadway revival of Christopher Hampton's play Les Liaisons Dangereuses alongside Mamie Gummer and Benjamin Walker at the Roundabout Theatre Company's American Airlines Theatre. Since 2009, Linney has served as host of the PBS television series Masterpiece Classic. She became a popular meme and vine for her introductions when saying, "Hi, I'm Laura Linney and this is Masterpiece Classic".

In 2009, Linney took part of the We Are One: The Obama Inaugural Celebration at the Lincoln Memorial in which she read passages from Franklin D. Roosevelt, and John F. Kennedy. The event, which was free and open to the public at the Lincoln Memorial in Washington, D.C. According to the Presidential Inaugural Committee, "The Sunday afternoon performance will be grounded in history and brought to life with entertainment that relates to the themes that shaped Barack Obama, and which will be the hallmarks of his administration." Obama spoke at the end of the event which featured actors reading historical passages as well as musical performances.

=== 2010s ===
In 2010, Linney starred in the Broadway production of Time Stands Still by Donald Margulies alongside Brian D'Arcy James and Alicia Silverstone at Manhattan Theatre Club's Samuel J. Friedman Theatre from January 28, 2010, through March 27, 2010. She received her third Tony Award nomination for her performance. The play returned to Broadway with most of the original cast in September 2010 and closed on January 30, 2011. That same year, Linney returned to television in Showtime's half-hour series about cancer, The Big C. She served as both an actress and executive producer on the show. She starred as a suburban wife and mother who explores the emotional ups and downs of suffering cancer, and the changes it brings to her life and her sense of who she is. In 2011, she won a Golden Globe Award for her performance. In 2013, she won her fourth Primetime Emmy Award for the final season of the series.

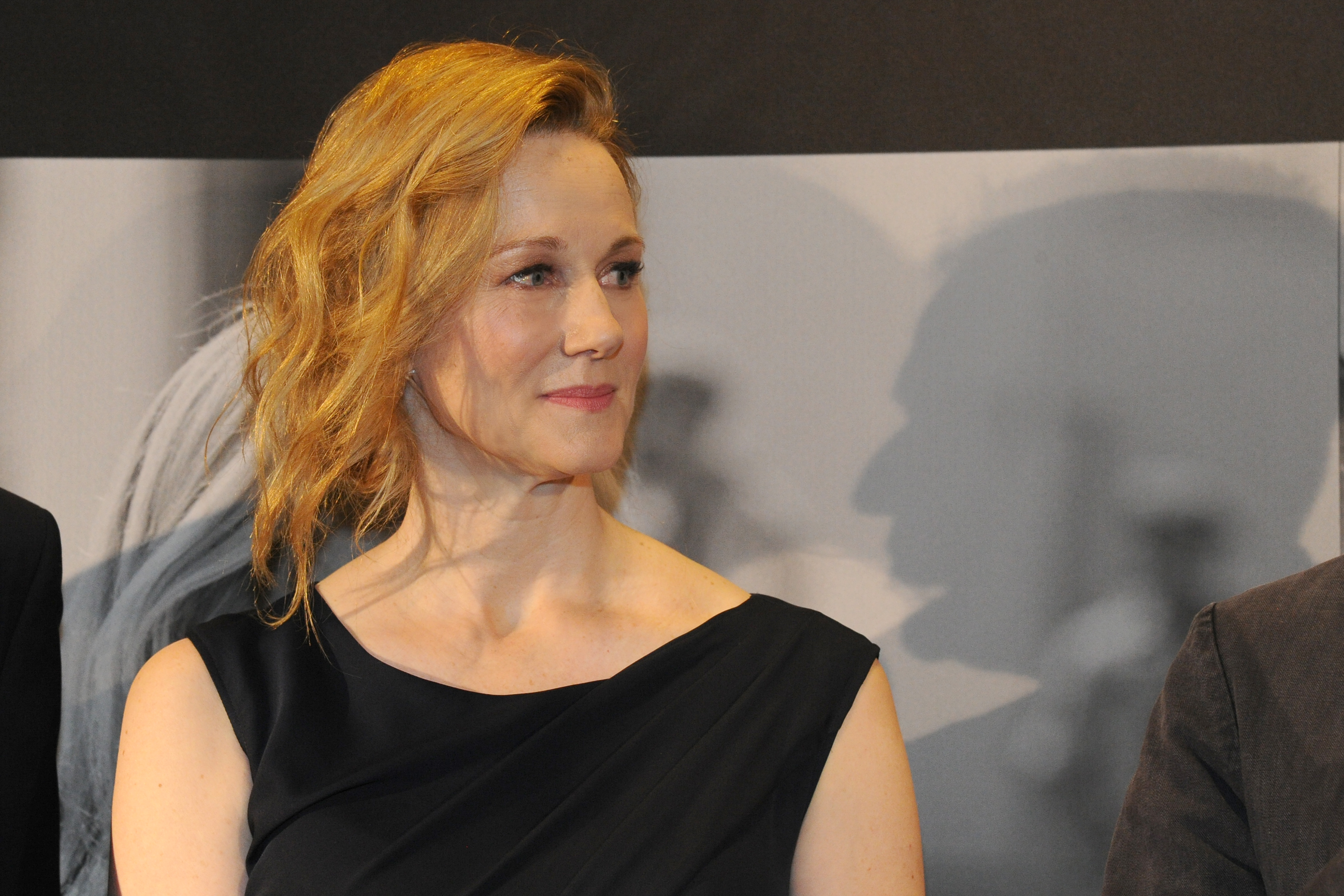
Linney at the U.S. Embassy in Berlin (2016)

In 2012, she starred in Roger Mitchell's Hyde Park on Hudson alongside Bill Murray as Franklin D. Roosevelt. The film also starred Olivia Colman, Olivia Williams and Samuel West. Murray was nominated for a Golden Globe Award for his performance. In 2015, she starred in Bill Condon's Mr. Holmes alongside Ian McKellen. The film received rave reviews, earning an 89% on Rotten Tomatoes with the consensus reading, "Mr. Holmes focuses on the man behind the mysteries, and while it may lack Baker Street thrills, it more than compensates with tenderly wrought, well-acted drama." In 2016, she appeared in Clint Eastwood's Sully with Tom Hanks as Lorraine Sullenberger, the wife of Chesley Sullenberger. The film was a critical and commercial success making almost US$240 million at the box office.

She starred in Genius (2016) alongside Colin Firth, Jude Law, Nicole Kidman, Guy Pearce and Dominic West. She appeared briefly in Tom Ford's critical hit Nocturnal Animals alongside Amy Adams, Jake Gyllenhaal, and Michael Shannon. The consensus from the review aggregator Rotten Tomatoes is, "Well-acted and lovely to look at, Nocturnal Animals further underscores writer-director Tom Ford's distinctive visual and narrative skill".

From 2017 to 2022, she appeared in Netflix's crime drama series Ozark alongside Jason Bateman. She was nominated for the Screen Actors Guild Award for her performances in both seasons one and two and for the Primetime Emmy Award for Outstanding Lead Actress in a Drama Series for seasons two, three and four.

In 2017, she starred in the Broadway revival of The Little Foxes alongside Cynthia Nixon at Manhattan Theatre Club's Samuel J. Friedman Theatre from April 19 to July 2, 2017. She alternated the roles of Regina and Birdie with Nixon. She received her fourth Tony Award nomination for her performance. In 2018, Linney starred in a monologue play adapted from the Elizabeth Strout novel by Rona Munro titled My Name Is Lucy Barton, at the Bridge Theatre in London directed by Richard Eyre. It previewed on June 2, 2018, and opened on June 6.

Linney reprised her role as Mary Ann Singleton in the 2019 Netflix miniseries Tales of the City based on the Tales of the City series alongside Olympia Dukakis and Elliot Page.

=== 2020s ===
In 2020, Linney starred in Falling opposite Viggo Mortensen, who also directed. It had its world premiere at the Sundance Film Festival on January 31, 2020. She next starred in The Roads Not Taken, directed by Sally Potter, alongside Javier Bardem and Elle Fanning. It premiered at the Berlin International Film Festival on February 26, 2020. Its general release was on March 13, 2020, but was pulled from theaters due to the COVID-19 pandemic, subsequently releasing on video on demand on April 10.

In 2020, Linney reprised her role in My Name Is Lucy Barton, returning to Broadway in the American premiere at Manhattan Theatre Club's Samuel J. Friedman Theatre. Preview performances began on January 6, 2020, with the play officially opening on January 15, Linney received rave reviews from critics, with The New York Times describing her as "luminous". For her performance she received a Drama Desk Award for Outstanding Solo Performance and her fifth nomination for a Tony Award.

In 2020, it was reported that Linney would star in the Irish film drama, The Miracle Club, with Maggie Smith and Kathy Bates. Its plot was described as a "joyful and hilarious" journey of a group of riotous working-class women from Dublin, whose pilgrimage to Lourdes in France leads them to discover each other's friendship and their own personal miracles." As of December 2021 it was in pre-production, having received sustaining funding from the U.K. Global Screen Fund. The Miracle Club premiered at the 2023 Tribeca Festival.

In 2022, Linney made her television directorial debut with the eleventh episode of Ozark's final season ("Pound of Flesh and Still Kickin'").

In 2023, Linney starred on Broadway in Summer, 1976 written by David Auburn opposite Jessica Hecht. Performances began April 25, 2023 at Manhattan Theatre Club's Samuel J. Friedman Theatre. The run ended on June 18, 2023.

== Personal life ==
Linney married actor David Adkins on September 2, 1995; they divorced in 2000. In 2007, she became engaged to Marc Schauer, a drug and alcohol counselor from Telluride, Colorado. On her wedding day in May 2009, actor Liam Neeson walked her down the aisle. She and Schauer have one son, who was born in 2014.

Linney was a guest and presenter at the We Are One: The Obama Inaugural Celebration at the Lincoln Memorial on January 18, 2009.

Since working on the mini-series Tales of the City, Linney has remained close friends with Armistead Maupin.

== Acting credits and accolades ==
Linney has received numerous accolades including two Golden Globe Awards, four Primetime Emmy Awards, and a Screen Actors Guild Award. She has received nominations for a BAFTA Award, and five Tony Awards.

Linney has also been nominated by the Academy of Motion Picture Arts and Sciences for:

- 73rd Academy Awards: Best Actress in a Leading Role, for You Can Count on Me (2000)
- 77th Academy Awards: Best Actress in a Supporting Role, for Kinsey (2004)
- 80th Academy Awards: Best Actress in a Leading Role, for The Savages (2007)
