= Philadelphia Chickens =

Compilation album by Sandra Boynton and Various Artists
- Released: 2002
- Recorded: Daisey Lane Studio, Malvern, PA; The Barn, Sailsbury, CT; The Hit Studio, NYC; The Hotchkiss School, Lakeville, CT; The Lake House, Taconic, CT; Triple Z Studio, NYC
- Genre: Children's music
- Length: 48:12
- Label: Rounder Kids

Sandra Boynton chronology
Rhinoceros Tap (1996)	Philadelphia Chickens (2002)	Dog Train (2005)

Philadelphia Chickens is a book/music CD combination by Sandra Boynton and Michael Ford, published in 2002. The first half of the book contains lyrics and illustrations, while the second half contains musical notation for each song. It was reviewed favorably by The Philadelphia Inquirer and was also reviewed by Publishers Weekly.

A new edition of the songbook with updated illustrations was released on September 5, 2023.

== Tracks/Chapters ==
	Title	Performer	Style
1	Cows	The Seldom Herd	Broadway chorus line
2	Nobody Understands Me	Meryl Streep	Slow jazz
3	Philadelphia Chickens	The Bacon Brothers	Swing
4	Be Like A Duck	Keith Boynton	
5	Please, Can I Keep it	Laura Linney	
6	Snuggle Puppy	Eric Stoltz	
7	I Like To Fuss	Patti LuPone	Broadway
8	Snoozers	The Bacon Brothers	Folk song
9	Faraway Cookies	Caitlin McEwan	Torch song
10	The Intermission Song!	Aaaardvarks	Barbershop quartet
11	Fifteen Animals	John Stey	
12	Belly Button (Round)	The Heath Sisters	New Age/Round
13	BusyBusyBusy	Kevin Kline	Patter song / Gilbert and Sullivan
14	Those Dinosaur Blues	Michael Ford	Blues
15	Dinosaur, Dinosaur	Darcy Boynton	Jump-rope rhyme
16	Jump Rope Jive	Beth Andrien	Andrews Sisters
17	Pig Island	Scott Bakula	Jimmy Buffett / Calypso
18	Pajama Time	Adam Bryant	Elvis Presley / Bubblegum Pop
19	Silly Lullaby	Natasha Richardson	Lullaby
20	Philadelphia Chickens (instrumental reprise)		

== Awards ==
Philadelphia Chickens was nominated for the Grammy Award for Best Musical Album for Children at the 46th Annual Grammy Awards in 2004.

In 2014, the album was certified platinum.
