= 1000 Park Avenue =

Residential building in Manhattan, New York

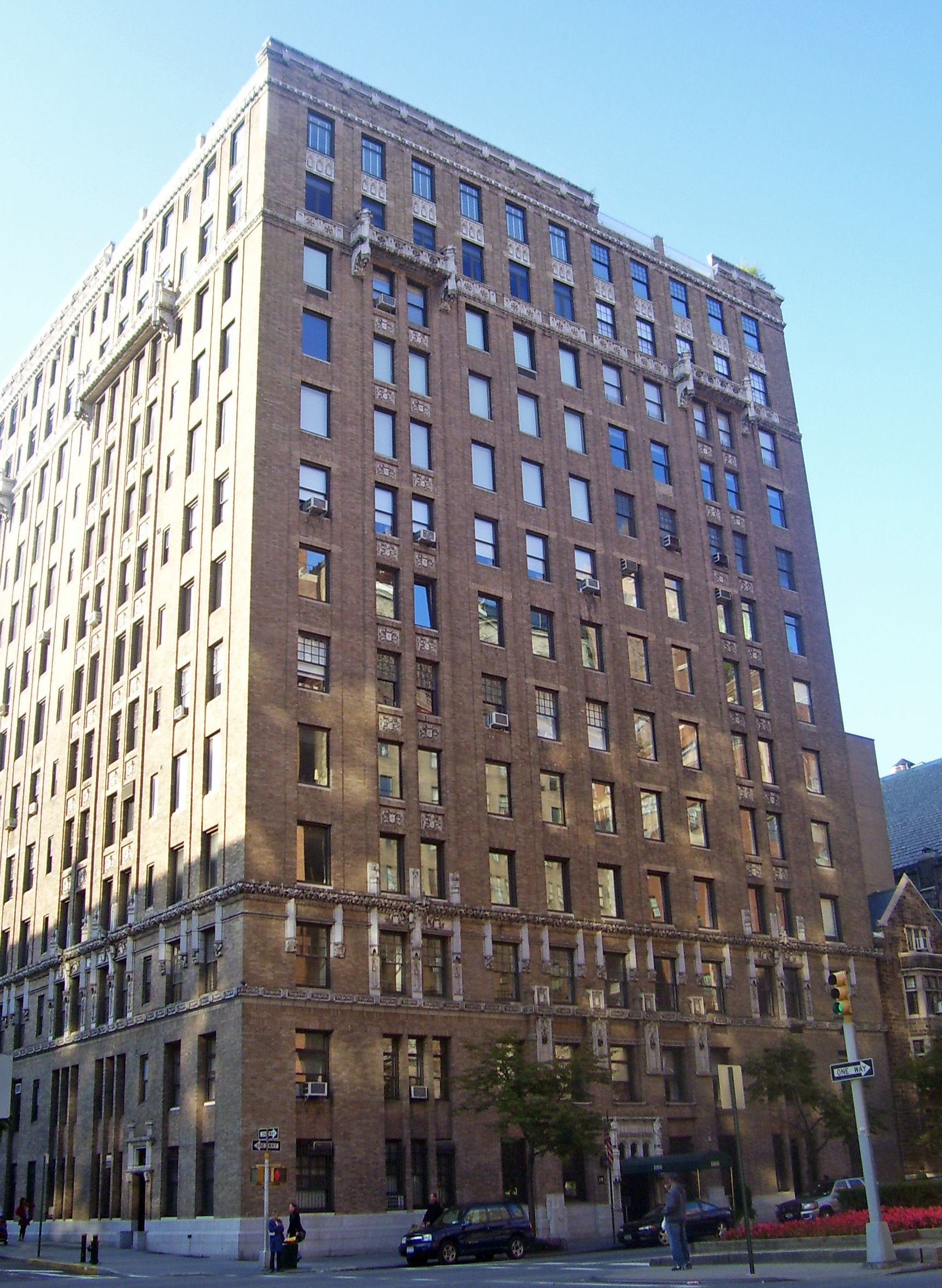
- Looking southeast (2008)
- Interactive map of the 1000 Park Avenue area
- Alternative names: 1000 Park

General information
- Type: Co-operative apartments
- Location: 1000 Park Avenue, New York City, United States
- Coordinates: 40°46′45″N 73°57′30″W
- Current tenants: approx. 70-140 homeowners
- Construction started: 1915
- Completed: 1916
- Owner: Building co-op

Technical details
- Floor count: 13 (70 apartment units)

Design and construction
- Architect: Emery Roth
- Main contractor: Bing & Bing

1000 Park Avenue is an apartment building on the Upper East Side of the New York City borough of Manhattan. It is located at the northwest corner of the intersection of Park Avenue and East 84th Street. It was built in 1915–16 by the developers Bing & Bing from a design by Emery Roth. The brown brick structure is 13 stories tall with some Gothic-inspired stone and terra cotta decoration. Two carved figures in medieval dress near the main entrance are said to represent the Bing brothers. Across 84th Street is the Church of St. Ignatius Loyola.

The building is currently a co-op owned by its residents. There are 64 units.

== Residents ==
Among the former residents of the building are the British author P. G. Wodehouse, James J. Rorimer, former Director of the Metropolitan Museum of Art, and Nicola Kraus, co-author of the 2002 bestselling chick lit novel The Nanny Diaries. She vehemently denies that Mrs. X, the mother in the novel, set at a similar Park Avenue building with a fictitious address, is based partially on women she worked for at 1000 Park. Most often speculated as the model for the character is Lisa Birnbach, a part-time CBS News correspondent best known for editing The Official Preppy Handbook in 1980, who has some similarities to the character in the book. Birnbach confirmed that Kraus had worked for her, but described her as "more of a play date for my daughter" than an actual nanny.

Another resident of 1000 Park named as a possible model for Mrs. X did not return phone calls from The New York Times requesting comment. Kraus did not think it inappropriate to use her former neighbors as models for her characters, but current residents of building disagreed. One even referred to Kraus as a "snitch" and suggested the co-op board should forbid residents from fictionalizing their neighbors' lives.
