= Moo, Baa, La La La! =

1982 children's picture book by Sandra Boynton

- Author: Sandra Boynton
- Illustrator: Sandra Boynton
- Language: English
- Genre: Children's literature, picture book, Board book
- Published: 1982 (Little Simon)
- Publication place: USA
- Media type: Print (hardback)
- Pages: 13 (unpaginated)
- ISBN: 9780671449018
- OCLC: 229227978

Moo, Baa, La La La! is a 1982 children's picture book written and illustrated by Sandra Boynton about various animals and the noises they make. It was published by Little Simon Books.

== Reception ==
A review by Common Sense Media called Moo, Baa, La La La! "terrific for a broad age range of children." and wrote "It's entirely functional, introducing tots to animals and teaching them the creatures' sounds. Yet Sandra Boynton's unique style breathes invigorating life into a well-worked format."

Moo, Baa, La La La! has also been reviewed by Kirkus Reviews.

It is in the School Library Journal Top 100 picture books list, and is one of America's bestselling children's books.
