= Rhinoceros Tap =

1996 album by Sandra Boynton

Rhinoceros Tap: and 14 Other Seriously Silly Songs is an album released by Boynton Recordings in 1996, owned by author Sandra Boynton. All songs are by Boynton and Michael Ford, lyrics by Boynton, and recorded by Adam Bryant, with Michael Ford as instrumentals and backup vocals. The album can be found on Apple Music and Spotify. Boynton wrote the album because she was unhappy with the available recorded children's music. She later wrote that she sought to "create an album that would somewhat parallel that ran beneath my own childhood". She had hopes that her songs would withstand repeated listening by adults. The album was reissued in 2004 with an enhanced version of the accompanying book, listed various as Rhinoceros Tap: 15 Seriously Silly Songs and simply as Rhinoceros Tap (ISBN 0761133232).

The album was certified "gold" for sales of 500,000 by the RIAA on September 28, 2007. The International Rhino Foundation included the album and its accompanying book on their "Books About Rhinos That We Love: Pre‐Kindergarten Through 6th Grade" list, calling it "Just Plain Fun".

The album contains the song "Barnyard Dance", with the lyrics taken from a 1993 book of the same name by Boynton (ISBN 1563054426, Workman Publishing) that Publishers Weekly identified as the 118th best-selling children's hardcover book of all time. Boynton later created books based on the songs "Perfect Piggies" (ISBN 0761159932 , Workman Publishing, 2012) and "Tickle Time" (ISBN 0761168834, Workman Publishing, 2012).

== Track listing ==
1. "Rhinoceros Tap"
2. "O, Lonely Peas"
3. "Bad Babies"
4. "The Crabby Song"
5. "Perfect Piggies"
6. "Tropical Sand"
7. "So Long, Doggies"
8. "The Shortest Song in the Universe"
9. "Horns to Toes"
10. "Barnyard Dance"
11. "I Love You More Than Cheese"
12. "Tickle Time"
13. "Dinosaur Round"
14. "Turkey Love Song"
15. "Little One"
16. "Rhinoceros Tap" (instrumental reprise)
