= Nicholas Art =

American child actor

- Born: Nicholas Reese Art; January 13, 1999 (age 27); Milford, Connecticut, U.S.
- Other name: Nick Art
- Occupation: Child actor
- Years active: 2002–2010

Nicholas Reese Art (born January 13, 1999) is an American former child actor. He is known for his roles in the films Syriana (2005) and The Nanny Diaries (2007), as well as the soap opera Guiding Light (2002–2008).

== Life and career ==
Art was born in Milford, Connecticut on January 13, 1999, the son of Sharon and Richard Art.

He began his career at the age of three, playing Zach Spaulding on the soap opera Guiding Light (2002–2008). He then appeared in the feature films Syriana (2005) and The Nanny Diaries (2007), the television series Cashmere Mafia (2008) and the television film Taking Chance (2009). His last film job was an uncredited role in Knight and Day (2010).

== Awards and nominations ==
Year	Award	Category	Nominated work	Result
2008	29th Young Artist Awards	Best Performance in a Feature Film – Young Actor Ten and Under	The Nanny Diaries	Nominated
