= The Nanny Diaries =

2002 novel by Emma McLaughlin and Nicola Kraus

- First edition cover
- Author: Emma McLaughlin and Nicola Kraus
- Cover artist: Anne Twomey (design); Herman Estevez Studio (photography)
- Language: English
- Genre: Chick lit
- Publisher: St. Martin's Press
- Publication date: 2002
- Publication place: United States
- Media type: Print (hardback & paperback), Audio CD
- Pages: 306
- ISBN: 978-0-3122-9163-1
- OCLC: 51895582

The Nanny Diaries is a 2002 novel by Emma McLaughlin and Nicola Kraus, both of whom are former nannies. The book satirizes upper-class Manhattan society as seen through the eyes of their children's caregivers.

== Writing ==
The writers were students at New York University's Gallatin School of Individualized Study when they wrote the book. Both had worked as nannies for about 30 different wealthy families on the Upper East Side, where the book is set. As a child, Kraus lived at 1000 Park Avenue, and claims she modeled some of the characters, particularly Mrs. X, on other building residents.

== Other media ==
A film adaptation starring Scarlett Johansson, Paul Giamatti, and Laura Linney was released in the United States on August 24, 2007. The novel was also released as an audiobook, read by actress Julia Roberts.

== Sequel ==
In 2010 Kraus and McLaughlin released a sequel called Nanny Returns, in which Nan and Ryan (aka Harvard Hottie) are married. After having lived abroad for twelve years, they have returned to New York, where they move into a fixer-upper, and Nan hopes to start a business. One night, a drunken, 16-year-old Grayer shows up at their door, demanding to know why Nan abandoned him years earlier, and thrusting the couple back into Mrs X's life.

== Characters ==
=== Nanny Schuester ===
Originally in college when the first book began, Nanny Schuester was the primary nanny to Grayer X, and eventually began to love him as a son. Mrs. X fires her after seeing the close interaction between Nanny and Grayer, jealous that her son prefers Nanny over her. The X's force Nanny to leave without saying goodbye to Grayer, something that haunts her. In a rage, Nanny records herself on the "NannyCam", accusing the X's of being bad parents and begging them to simply love their son. While working for the X's, Nanny meets and falls in love with a boy who lives in the same building as the X's, who she nicknames "Harvard Hottie", as that is where he went to school. In the sequel, Nanny Returns twelve years have passed since the conclusion of the first book. Now married to Harvard Hottie, they move back to New York after spending six years traveling the globe through his UN program. Afterward, a sixteen-year-old Grayer turns up on her doorstep, drunk and still bitter over how things ended between them. Still feeling guilty for leaving Grayer when he was four, she decides to help him. Thus, this brings her back in with the X's, who have not changed in the past twelve years. However, her focus on helping Grayer puts a strain on her relationship with Harvard Hottie, who feels that it's not her place to be Grayer's "nanny" anymore.

=== Ryan Hutchinson aka "Harvard Hottie" ===
Originally living in the same building as the X's, HH runs into Nanny in the elevator while she is hanging out with Grayer. Nicknamed Harvard Hottie by Nanny (as he attended Harvard), they begin to gain a rapport. However, their relationship almost crumbles when she runs into him and his high school friends, who he doesn't stop when they insinuate that she is only a nanny so she can have affairs with rich husbands. However, after apologizing, they begin a relationship. In Nanny Returns, Harvard Hottie (his real name is revealed to be Ryan Hutchinson) is now married to Nanny and, after moving around the world due to his UN duties, decide to move back to New York. However, their relationship becomes strained because he wants to immediately start a family while she is hesitant to do so. He also does not support her getting sucked back in into the drama of the X family, as he knows the toll it took on her the first time.

=== Mrs. X ===
Grayer's mother, Mrs. X is self-centered and a poor mother. She leaves all the parenting work for Grayer on Nanny, with Mrs. X spending most of her time in seclusion or shopping. However, she doesn't like to spend money on others, as she poorly compensates Nanny for working overtime and fires workers whenever she feels like it. Her relationship with her husband is almost non-existent due to his constant cheating and constantly long work hours. However, she grows jealous of Nanny once Grayer starts seeing Nanny as his mother over her. She fires Nanny and prevents her from seeing Grayer to say goodbye. In Nanny Returns, she has remained the same but has had another son (from Mr. X). She becomes severely depressed due to Mr. X leaving her for a younger woman. She kept Nanny's video from the "NannyCam" in case she had to sue Mr. X for custody of their children. However, she finds out that the reason that her husband was wealthy was that he was a con artist and the police have started to suspect him. Not wanting to lose her lifestyle (as she will get nothing in the divorce if he is caught), she decides to turn a blind eye. However, when Mr. X is caught, Grayer tells her that he will financially support her. But only if she acts like a real mother to her younger son.

=== Mr. X ===
The very much not-present father of Grayer. He is married to Mrs. X but continually cheats on her with other women. He similarly works very long hours at his office and would rather not be a father to Grayer. In Nanny Returns, it is revealed that he is a con artist, which was how he gained so much money. He tried to convince Grayer that he wanted to spend quality time with him but actually wanted to use him to steal something. He also has left Mrs. X for a younger woman and cut off much of the money she was given.

=== Grayer X ===
The son of Mr. and Mrs. X. He is four-years-old during the events of the first book. He becomes very close to Nanny and begins to see her as his real mother since his actual parents neglect him. Unknown to him, Nanny was fired due to a jealous Mrs. X who also prevented Nanny from saying goodbye to him. This abrupt and seemingly cold departure emotionally scarred him as he grew older. In Nanny Returns, Grayer is now sixteen with a seven-year-old younger brother. He shows up on Nanny's doorstep drunk after seeing the "NannyCam" video and looking up her address from his mother's files. He's still hurt by Nanny's disappearance from his life, as she was the only person who truly cared for him. He doesn't trust her anymore but also wants his brother to succeed and requests her help. He eventually finds out why she had left so suddenly and forgives her. He decides to move out of his mother's house and live independently, realizing that his parents never really cared for him. Nanny offers to adopt both him and his brother, but he turns her down, saying he needs to do things on his own. However, he promises to stay in touch. Before he leaves, Nanny gives him a charm he had given her when he was four, telling him to always remember their time together as she has.
