= The Nanny Diaries (film) =

2007 film by Shari Springer Berman and Robert Pulcini

- Theatrical release poster
- Directed by: Shari Springer Berman Robert Pulcini
- Screenplay by: Robert Pulcini; Shari Springer Berman
- Based on: The Nanny Diaries by: Emma McLaughlin; Nicola Kraus
- Produced by: Richard N. Gladstein
- Starring: Scarlett Johansson; Laura Linney; Alicia Keys; Chris Evans; Donna Murphy; Paul Giamatti
- Cinematography: Terry Stacey
- Edited by: Robert Pulcini
- Music by: Mark Suozzo
- Production company: FilmColony
- Distributed by: Metro-Goldwyn-Mayer; The Weinstein Company
- Release date: August 24, 2007 (United States)
- Running time: 106 minutes
- Country: United States
- Language: English
- Budget: $20 million
- Box office: $47.8 million

The Nanny Diaries is a 2007 American comedy drama film written and directed by Shari Springer Berman and Robert Pulcini, based on the 2002 novel by Emma McLaughlin and Nicola Kraus. Starring Scarlett Johansson, Chris Evans, Laura Linney and Paul Giamatti. The film tells the story of a college graduate who goes to work as a nanny for a wealthy family in New York City. Ensconced in their home, she has to juggle their dysfunction, a new romance, and the child in her charge.

The Nanny Diaries was released in the United States on August 24, 2007, by Metro-Goldwyn-Mayer and The Weinstein Company. It received mixed reviews from critics and grossed $47.8 million against a $20 million budget.

== Plot ==
Twenty-one-year-old Montclair State University graduate Annie Braddock has no idea what or who she wants to be. One day, while sitting in the park, Annie sees a young boy about to be hit by a Segway. Annie saves him and meets the boy's mother, Mrs. X. When Annie introduces herself, Mrs. X mistakes her words for "Nanny" and hires her to be a live-in nanny for Grayer (Mrs. X also continues to call her "Nanny" instead of "Annie" throughout the film).

Annie moves into the Xs' apartment, claiming to her mother Judy that she is taking a job at a bank. Life with the incredibly privileged Xs is not what she thought it would be, and her life is complicated further when she falls for "Harvard Hottie", who also lives in the building. Interspersed with her life as the Xs' nanny are her interactions with "Harvard Hottie", as well as her longtime friend Lynette. "Harvard Hottie" reveals to Annie that he can relate to her charge Grayer, as when he lost his mother at age four, his absentee father left him with a string of nannies until he reached the age he could be shipped off to boarding school.

Annie continues to keep her mother in the dark about her real job, giving her regular but false progress reports. Further complications arise when Judy decides to visit her, forcing Annie to pretend Lynette and her roommate Calvin are a couple and that their apartment is Annie's apartment. Judy ultimately discovers the truth when Grayer becomes severely ill, and Annie desperately calls her for help.

After a rough start, Annie eventually bonds with Grayer, whom she addresses by his preferred code name, "Grover", and discovers that he is actually a sweet and loving child who is neglected by both his parents, explaining his uncontrollable behavior. Parallel to this, Annie begins to notice that Mrs. X is also being neglected by her husband, with Mr. X constantly being cruel to her and committing subtly obvious adultery. Mrs. X makes numerous attempts to make her husband love her, including faking a second pregnancy. Annie soon realizes that Mrs. X's own cruel treatment of her is due to Mrs. X's growing frustrations from her dysfunctional marriage.

Things take a turn for the worse during a family trip with the X's to Nantucket. She overhears Mrs. X telling a friend during a party that she has installed a "nanny cam" at their home in the city and plans to fire Annie after viewing footage showing Annie lovingly tending to Grayer (with Mrs. X grossly exaggerating her findings from the "nanny cam"). The next morning, Mr. X sexually assaults Annie just as Mrs. X enters the kitchen. She unreasonably fires Annie and sends her back to the city with her final payment of just $40.

Flying into a rage, Annie finds the "nanny cam" in the X's house and records her feelings toward the Xs. Mrs. X brings the tape to the school meeting for the Upper East Side mothers. Thinking that the tape will show Annie feeding Grayer peanut butter and jelly straight from a jar, she requests the coordinator to play it for everyone to see. All other parents in the room hear as Annie reveals the real relationship between the Xs, in the process making Mrs. X come to terms with her own reality and false happiness.

Annie reconciles with her mother and continues to date "Harvard Hottie", whose real name is revealed to be Hayden. She temporarily moves in with Lynette and Calvin, and pursues her growing interest in anthropology, much of which she learned through her time as the Xs' nanny.

A few months later, Hayden hands Annie an apology letter from Mrs. X, who has left Mr. X and is now raising Grayer as a single mother, finally able to bond with her son. Mrs. X expresses her gratitude to Annie for waking her up and changing her life. Also in the letter, Mrs. X addresses Annie for the first time by her real name (instead of Nanny), and signs the letter with her own first name, Alexandra (instead of Mrs. X).

== Cast ==
- Scarlett Johansson as Annie "Nanny" Braddock
- Laura Linney as Mrs. Alexandra X
- Alicia Keys as Lynette
- Chris Evans as Hayden "Harvard Hottie"
- Paul Giamatti as Mr. Stan X
- Donna Murphy as Judy Braddock
- Nicholas Reese Art as Grayer Addison X
- Judith Roberts as Milicent
- Julie White as Jane Gould
- Nate Corddry as Calvin
- Nina Garbiras as Miss Chicago
- Brande Roderick as Tanya
- Heather Simms as Murnel

== Reception ==
=== Critical response ===
On Rotten Tomatoes, 34% of 132 critics gave the film a positive review, with an average rating of 5/10. The website's critics consensus reads, "The Nanny Diaries' miscast lead and unrealistic, one-dimensional characters make this class satire far less effective than it should've been." According to Metacritic, which calculated a weighted average score of 46 out of 100 based on 33 critics, the film received "mixed or average reviews". Audiences polled by CinemaScore gave the film an average grade of "B−" on an A+ to F scale.

=== Box office ===
The film was released in the United Kingdom on October 12, 2007. The film debuted at #6 at the box office in the United States with $7.4 million in 2,629 theaters in its opening weekend. It went on to gross $25.9 million domestically and $21.8 million overseas, for a total worldwide gross of $47.7 million against a $20 million budget.
