= Summer, 1976 =

Play by David Auburn

- 2023 Broadway production poster
- Original language: English
- Written by: David Auburn
- Characters: Diana; Alice
- Genre: Comedy, Drama

Premiere
- Date: April 25, 2023
- Place: Samuel J. Friedman Theatre

Summer, 1976 is a Broadway play written by David Auburn. The story follows two women living in Ohio who become unlikely friends over playdates with their respective young daughters during the summer of 1976, the American Bicentennial. It began previews at the Samuel J. Friedman Theatre on April 4, 2023, with an opening date set for April 25.

== Production ==
The play was originally announced to debut in late 2022 Off-Broadway, but in August 2022 it was announced that it would instead receive a Broadway staging in April 2023 by the Manhattan Theatre Club, which is producing the show.

The Broadway production starred Laura Linney as Diana and Jessica Hecht as Alice. Daniel Sullivan directed, with set design by John Lee Beatty, lighting design by Japhy Weideman, costume design by Linda Cho, sound design by Jill BC Du Boff, projection design by Hana S. Kim, and original music by Greg Pliska. The production received generally positive reviews, with The New York Times calling it "sharply observant, too, and subtly, insistently feminist" and Deadline praised Hecht and Linney's performances as "outstanding." Even so, some critics felt the show was under-staged with both actors seated for much of the play, with Time Out New York comparing the production to "watching an audiobook."

The production was set to run from April 25 until May 28 but received two extensions and closed on June 18, 2023.

== Premise ==
Diana, an artist and single mother, and Alice, a free-spirited and naive young housewife, forge an unlikely friendship one night in Ohio.

== Cast and characters ==
Character	Broadway
Character	2023
Diana	Laura Linney
Alice	Jessica Hecht

== Awards and nominations ==
Year	Award	Category	Nominee	Result	Ref.
2023	Tony Awards	Best Performance by a Leading Actress in a Play	Jessica Hecht	Nominated	
2023	Outer Critics Circle Award	Outstanding New Broadway Play		Nominated	
2023	Drama League Award	Outstanding Production of a Play		Nominated	
2023	Drama League Award	Distinguished Performance	Laura Linney	Nominated	
