= Sandra Boynton =

American humorist and children's book author (born 1953)

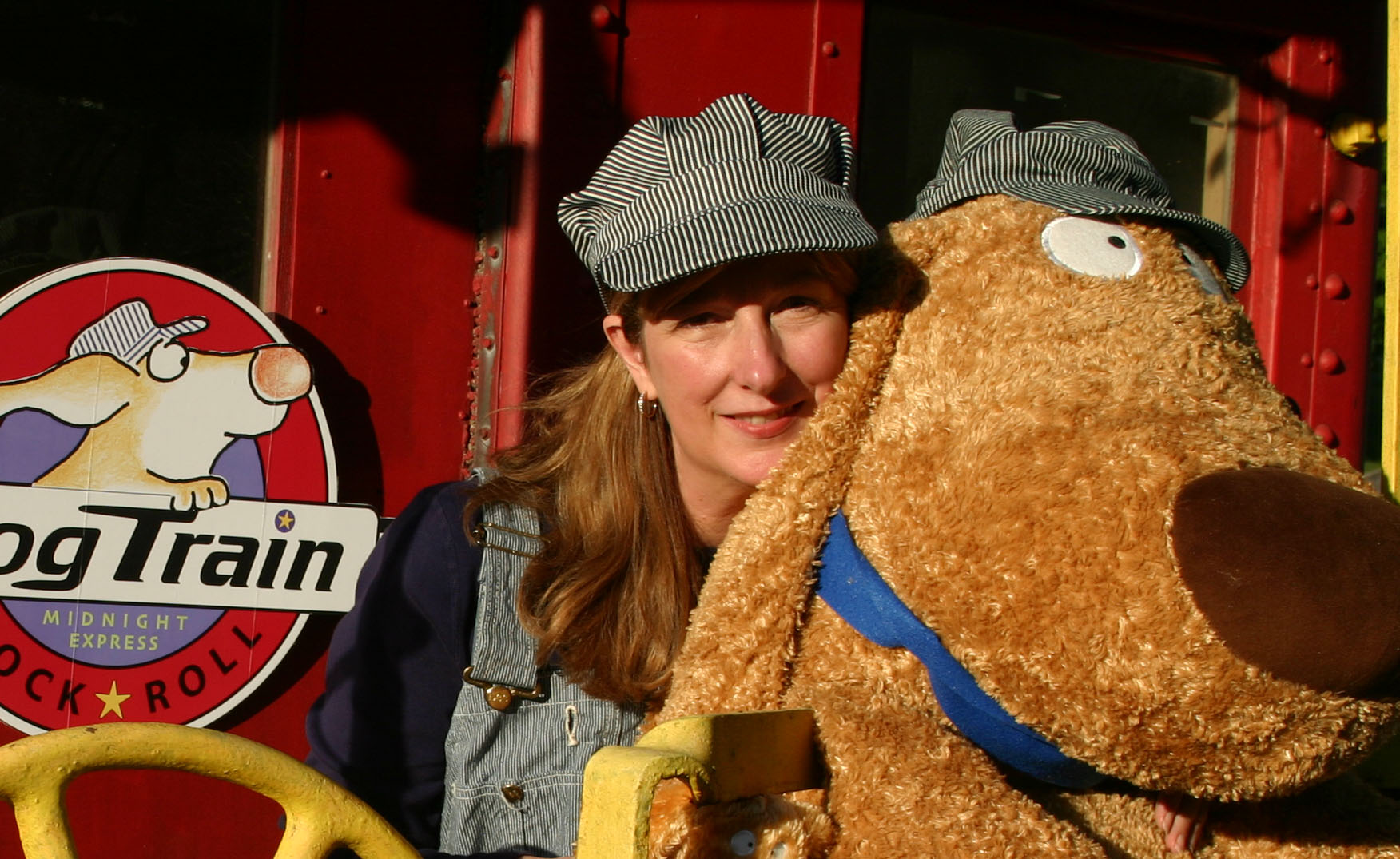
- Boynton around 2005
- Born: April 3, 1953 (age 73); Orange, New Jersey, U.S.
- Education: Yale University (BA); University of California, Berkeley
- Occupations: Illustrator; Cartoonist; Humorist; Author; Songwriter
- Website: sandraboynton.com

Sandra Keith Boynton (born April 3, 1953) is an American humorist, songwriter, director, music producer, children's author, and illustrator. Boynton has written and illustrated over eighty-five books for children and seven general audience books, as well as over four thousand greeting cards, and seven music albums. She has also designed calendars, wallpaper, bedding, stationery, paper goods, clothing, jewelry, and plush toys for various companies.

== Early life and education ==
The third of the four daughters of Jeanne (née Ragsdale) and Robert W. Boynton, Sandra was born in Orange, New Jersey, and grew up in the Mount Airy section of Philadelphia. Her father was a noted progressive educator, scholar (collaborating on textbooks with Shakespearean scholar Maynard Mack), and publisher and co-founder of Boynton/Cook Publishers. Boynton/Cook Publishers is now owned by Heinemann.

Boynton's parents became Quakers when she was two years old. From kindergarten through 12th grade, she and her sisters attended Germantown Friends School, where their father taught English and was Head of the Upper School. Boynton has frequently cited Germantown Friends' arts-centered curriculum as central to her own "upbeat offbeat" sensibility as well as its thorough integration of the values of pacifism, independent inquiry, and individualism. She spent the second semester of her junior year studying in Paris through Wesleyan University's program. At Yale, she majored in English and also sang sporadically with the Yale Glee Club. She had joined the Glee Club when additional singers were needed for a performance of Beethoven's Ninth Symphony at Carnegie Hall, under the direction of Leopold Stokowski. Boynton has described herself as "an enthusiastic but undistinguished alto".

At her graduation from Yale in 1974, she received a Special Master's Magna solemnly bestowed by Charles Davis, the Master of Boynton's residential college, Calhoun College. Unbeknownst to the graduation audience, the honor was actually a fiction. Boynton's grade point average did not in fact entitle her to any degree honor; but shortly before the ceremony, she had told Professor Davis in mock earnest that "my parents are here, so I'd really appreciate it if you could just mumble some Latin after my name".

Boynton intended to become a theater director. She attended the University of California, Berkeley for a year for graduate studies in drama, then transferred to the Yale School of Drama D.F.A. program; however, she did not complete the program. With the birth of her first child in 1979, Boynton postponed indefinitely a career in the theater, judging the demands of that profession not easily compatible with raising a family.

During her undergraduate and graduate years, her teachers included Cleanth Brooks, Harold Bloom, Richard B. Sewall, Maynard Mack, Maurice Sendak, Richard Gilman, Rocco Landesman, David Milch, Stanley Kauffmann, and William Arrowsmith. In an autobiographical talk given at Yale on January 30, 2001, "The Curious Misuse of a Yale Education", Boynton refers to her book Grunt (an illuminated book and recording of plainchant in Latin and Pig Latin) as "the culmination of a lifetime spent joyfully squandering an expensive education on producing works of no apparent significance".

== Career ==
=== Greeting cards ===
Boynton's greeting card designs for Recycled Paper Greetings were at the forefront of the Alternative Cards commercial movement that began in the mid-1970s. According to RPG co-founder and president Mike Keiser, nearly 500 million copies of Boynton's distinctive humorous cards—featuring an assortment of unnamed cartoon animal characters, spare layout, and droll messages—sold between 1973 and 2003. A 1975 birthday card bearing images of four animals and the message "Hippo Birdie Two Ewes", a pun playing on the phrase "Happy Birthday to You", has sold over ten million copies to date.

=== Books ===
Since the 1977 release of Hippos Go Berserk!, Boynton has published many children's books, as well as several illustrated humor books for the general market. Her books are most typically for very young children, offered in the laminated paperboard format known as board books. Nearly all of Boynton's books have been published by either Workman Publishing or Simon & Schuster. Five of her books have been New York Times best sellers: Chocolate: The Consuming Passion (1982); Yay, You! (2001); Consider Love (2002); Philadelphia Chickens (2002), which reached the number one position on the list, and was on the list for nearly a year; and Woo Hoo! You're Doing Great! (2023). Six Boynton books were on the 2001 Publishers Weekly All-Time Bestselling Children's Books list: Moo, Baa, La La La!, The Going to Bed Book, Barnyard Dance, A to Z, Blue Hat, Green Hat, and Oh My Oh My Oh Dinosaurs! And Eek! Halloween!. More than 90 million copies of her books have been sold

=== Theater ===
In May 1995, Boynton wrote and directed a benefit reading, On Stage—featuring Jill Clayburgh, Joe Pacheco, and Jane Curtin—for Sharon Stage in Connecticut. In November 2005, and again in November 2007 she presented songs from Philadelphia Chickens, Dog Train, and Blue Moo at the Kennedy Center's Millennium Stage, co-hosting in 2007 with Davy Jones of the Monkees. In November 2006, she directed her son Keith in his own play, The Quotable Assassin, Off-Off-Broadway at Alternate Stages.

=== Music ===
In 1996, Boynton began writing and producing songs—which she has described as "renegade children's music"—with composer Michael Ford; these songs have been released as albums (Rhinoceros Tap 1996, Philadelphia Chickens 2002, Dog Train 2005, BLUE MOO: 17 Jukebox Hits from Way Back Never 2007, FROG TROUBLE Fall 2013 and Hog Wild in 2017) and also published as book and audio disc sets. The tracks were recorded, under Boynton's direction and Ford's musical direction, by an eclectic roster of actors and musicians, including Blues Traveler, Meryl Streep, Alison Krauss, Steve Lawrence, and Eydie Gorme, John Ondrasik of Five for Fighting, Kevin Kline, Laura Linney, "Weird Al" Yankovic duetting with Kate Winslet, Patti LuPone, The Bacon Brothers with Mickey Hart, Eric Stoltz, the Spin Doctors, Mark Lanegan, Hootie & the Blowfish, Natasha Richardson, Billy J. Kramer, Scott Bakula, Eric Bazilian and Rob Hyman, The Phenomenauts, Brian Wilson, Neil Sedaka, B.B. King, Sha Na Na, Steve Lawrence, Bobby Vee, Gerry & The Pacemakers, Davy Jones of The Monkees, Dwight Yoakam, Fountains of Wayne, Kacey Musgraves, Ryan Adams, Ben Folds, Brad Paisley, Josh Turner, Darius Rucker, and Linda Eder. Boynton received a 2003 Grammy nomination for Philadelphia Chickens. The first three of these albums have been certified gold by the RIAA. In November 2010, Boynton produced and released a full-length 300-kazoo plus orchestra performance of Maurice Ravel's Boléro, titled Boléro Completely Unraveled, performed by the Highly Irritating Orchestra. Boynton played solo kazoo on this recording noting "I am at the perfect level of musical incompetence for this."

She has written the text for four choral pieces composed by Fenno Heath, Director Emeritus of the Yale Glee Club, all of which have been performed by the Yale Alumni Chorus on international tour.

Boynton also released a Christmas album entitled Cows and Holly with producer Mike Ford, in December 2024. It includes performances by Lyle Lovett, Patti Lupone, Yo-Yo Ma, Zooey Deschanel, and many others.

=== Music videos ===
In 2008, Boynton ventured into filmmaking, creating and directing music videos of her most popular recorded songs. Her first music video released in November 2009 as a book/DVD combination, was "One Shoe Blues", starring B.B. King and a cast of assorted sock puppets. Then she directed "Penguin Lament" starring John Ondrasik of Five for Fighting, "Philadelphia Chickens" which is mostly animation and includes cameos by Kevin Bacon and Michael Bacon, and "Be Like a Duck" which features all four of her children.

== Awards ==
Boynton received the Irma Simonton Black Award for Chloe and Maude, the National Parenting Publications Gold Medal for Barnyard Dance and for Your Personal Penguin, a Grammy Award Nomination for Philadelphia Chickens, the Eustace D. Theodore Fellowship (Yale University), the National Cartoonists Society Greeting Card Award for 1992, and the National Cartoonists Society Book Illustration Award for Blue Moo: 17 Jukebox Hits From Way Back Never, in 2008. She is the 2008 recipient of the Milton Caniff Lifetime Achievement Award, the National Cartoonists Society's highest honor. Hippos Go Berserk! was awarded Mathematical Sciences Research Institute’s Mathical Hall of Fame status in 2020.

Boyton has received a number of film festival awards for her film shorts: the Rhode Island International Film Festival Providence Prize 2010 for One Shoe Blues starring B. B. King; the Flickers North Country Film Festival 2010 Crystal Image Award for emerging artist, as director of all four films; the 2D or Not 2D Animation Festival 2011 Golden Pencil Award for Philadelphia Chickens; the Forster Film Festival 2012 Winner of Song Category for "Be Like a Duck"; and the Wilmette International Children's Film Festival 2012 Best of Fest Live Action Short Film Winner for One Shoe Blues.

== Personal life ==
Boynton was married to writer and Olympic Bronze medalist (and fellow Yale graduate) Jamie McEwan from 1978 until his death from cancer in 2014. McEwan wrote several children's books, two of which Boynton illustrated.

Boynton and McEwan have four children: Caitlin McEwan, an actress and director, Keith Boynton, a playwright and filmmaker, Devin McEwan, a whitewater slalom racer and member of the 2001–2016 U.S. Team, including the 2016 U.S. Olympic Team, and Darcy Boynton, a writer and teacher. All four children sang on the Philadelphia Chickens and BLUE MOO recordings.

In 1991, Boynton and McEwan moved with their children to the Hautes-Pyrénées region of France for a year so McEwan and his Whitewater Slalom doubles partner, Lecky Haller, could train with the French team for the 1992 Olympics in Barcelona. McEwan/Haller ended in 4th Place. McEwan was a member of several whitewater expeditions to Mexico, Bhutan, British Columbia, and a National Geographic–sponsored descent of part of the Tsang-Po River (Brahmaputra) in Tibet, an ill-fated trip detailed in The Last River by Todd Balf, and in Courting the Diamond Sow by expedition leader Wickliffe W. Walker.

Boynton has appeared on numerous national television, newspaper and radio programs. Media include The Today Show, USA Today, American Profile, NPR's All Things Considered, CBS Sunday Morning, The New York Times, and The Wall Street Journal.

Boynton works in a reconstructed 120-year-old barn on her property in rural Connecticut.

== Albums ==
- Rhinoceros Tap (1996)
- Grunt: Pigorian Chant (1996)
- Philadelphia Chickens (2002)
- Dog Train: A Wild Ride on the Rock-and-Roll Side (2005)
- Blue Moo: 17 Jukebox Hits from Way Back Never (2007)
- Boléro Completely Unraveled (2010)
- Sandra Boynton's Frog Trouble (2013)
- Hog Wild!: A Frenzy of Dance Music (2017)
- Cows and Holly (2024)

== Books ==
=== Children's books ===
- Hippos Go Berserk! (1977)
- Hester in the Wild (1979)
- If At First (1980)
- A to Z (1982)
- Blue Hat, Green Hat (1982)
- Doggies (1982)
- Horns to Toes (1982)
- The Going to Bed Book (1982)
- Moo, Baa, La La La! (1982)
- Opposites (1982)
- But Not the Hippopotamus (1982)
- A is for Angry (1983)
- Good Night, Good Night (1985)
- Chloe and Maude (1985)
- The Story of Grump & Pout (written by Jamie McEwan) (1988)
- Birthday Monsters! (1993)
- Barnyard Dance! (1993)
- One, Two, Three! (1993)
- Oh My Oh My Oh Dinosaurs! (1993)
- Snoozers (1997)
- Dinosaur's Binkit (1998)
- Bob and 6 More Christmas Stories (1999)
- Dinos To Go (2000)
- Hey!, Wake Up! (2000)
- Pajama Time! (2000)
- The Heart of Cool (written by Jamie McEwan) (2001)
- Snuggle Puppy! (2003)
- Fuzzy Fuzzy Fuzzy (2003)
- Moo Cow Book (cloth) (2004)
- Belly Button Book! (2005)
- Your Personal Penguin (book with song download) (2006)
- What's Wrong, Little Pookie? (2007)
- Bath Time! (2007)
- Fifteen Animals! (2008)
- Barnyard Bath! (2008)
- Let's Dance, Little Pookie (2008)
- Night-Night, Little Pookie (2009)
- One Shoe Blues (book and DVD) (2009)
- Happy Birthday, Little Pookie (2010)
- Perfect Piggies (2010)
- Are You a Cow? (customizable board book) (2010)
- Amazing Cows (2010)
- Happy Hippo, Angry Duck: a book of moods (2011)
- Little Pookie (2012)
- Christmas Parade (2012)
- Tickle Time! (2012)
- Are You a Cow? (2012)
- The Bunny Rabbit Show (2014)
- Spooky Pookie (2015)
- Eek! Halloween! (2016)
- Dinosaur Dance! (2016)
- But Not the Armadillo (2018)
- Merry Christmas, Little Pookie (2018)
- I Love You, Little Pookie (2018)
- Dinosnores (2019)
- Silly Lullaby (2019)
- Your Nose! (2020)
- How Big Is Zagnodd? (2020)
- Christmas Parade (2020)
- Jungle Night (Soundtrack with Yo Yo Ma on cello) (2021)
- Boo!, Baa, La La La! (2021)
- Woodland Dance! (2021)
- Moo, Baa, Fa La La La La! (2022)
- Pookie's Thanksgiving (2022)
- Peekaboo Rex! (2023)
- Happy Easter, Little Pookie (2023)
- Woo Hoo! You're Doing Great! (2023)
- Snow, Snow, Snow! (2023)
- Ooo, Baby Baby! (2023)
- Hippos Remain Calm (2023)
- Hey! What's That? (2024)
- Dinosaurs in Trucks Because Hey, Why Not? (2024)
- Hey! Look at You! (2024)
- Little Night Songs (2024)
- Little Love Songs (2024)
- Banana Bop! (2025)

=== General market books ===
- Gopher Baroque (1979)
- The Compleat Turkey (1980)
- Chocolate: The Consuming Passion (1982)
- Don't Let the Turkeys Get You Down (1986)
- Christmastime (1987)
- Yay, You! (2001)
- Consider Love (2002)
