= Emma McLaughlin =

American novelist

- Born: February 7, 1974 (age 52); Elmira, New York, U.S.
- Occupation: Novelist
- Writing career
- Period: 2002–present

Emma Lanier McLaughlin (born February 7, 1974, in Elmira, New York) is an American novelist.

== Biography ==
McLaughlin graduated from New York University's Gallatin School of Individualized Study. She met Nicola Kraus while both were attending New York University, and working as nannies. Their first novel, The Nanny Diaries, a tale about a 20-something New York nanny, reached #1 on The New York Times Best Seller list in 2002. The film version was released in 2007.

== Published works ==
=== With Nicola Kraus ===
- The Nanny Diaries (2002)
- Citizen Girl (2004)
- Dedication (2007)
- The Real Real (2009)
- Nanny Returns (2010)
- The First Affair (2013)
