= Wild Iris (film) =

2001 film

- VHS cover
- Genre: Drama
- Written by: Kent Broadhurst
- Directed by: Daniel Petrie
- Starring: Gena Rowlands; Laura Linney; Emile Hirsch; Lee Tergesen; Fred Ward
- Music by: Laurence Rosenthal
- Country of origin: United States
- Original language: English

Production
- Executive producers: Gary Lucchesi; Joyce Schweickert
- Producers: Kevin Goetz; Marshall Persinger
- Cinematography: Rene Ohashi
- Editor: Hughes Winborne
- Running time: 93 minutes
- Production company: Paramount Pictures

Original release
- Network: Showtime
- Release: August 5, 2001

Wild Iris is a 2001 American drama television film directed by Daniel Petrie, written by Kent Broadhurst, and starring Gena Rowlands and Laura Linney, with Emile Hirsch, Lee Tergesen, and Fred Ward in supporting roles. It aired on Showtime on August 5, 2001.

== Cast ==
- Gena Rowlands as Minnie Brinn
- Laura Linney as Iris Bravard
- Emile Hirsch as Lonnie Bravard
- Lee Tergesen as Lud van Eppy
- Fred Ward as Errol Podubney
- Miguel Sandoval as Ramando Galvez
- Scott Gibson as Ronnie Dale Bravard
- Amy Stewart as Rhondlyn Podubney

== Accolades ==
Laura Linney won the Emmy Award for Outstanding Lead Actress in a Miniseries or Movie. Gena Rowlands was also nominated for the same award. In addition, Wild Iris received a 2002 PRISM Award for TV Movies and Miniseries, 2002 Aurora Gold Award for excellence, and was nominated for the Golden Satellite Awards 2002 for Best Motion Picture Made for Television.
