= Nicola Kraus =

American novelist (born 1974)

- Born: August 17, 1974 (age 52); New York City, U.S.
- Education: Chapin School; New York University's Gallatin School of Individualized Study
- Occupation: Novelist
- Spouse: David Wheir (m. 2008)
- Writing career
- Period: 2002 – present

Nicola Kraus (born August 17, 1974) is an American novelist.

== Personal life ==
Kraus was born in New York City, and graduated from the Chapin School and then New York University's Gallatin School of Individualized Study. She met Emma McLaughlin while both were attending New York University, and working as nannies. She lived as a child at 1000 Park Avenue, whose residents she claims inspired some of the characters in her fiction.

Kraus married David Wheir on June 14, 2008.

== Published works (all with Emma McLaughlin) ==
- The Nanny Diaries (2002)
- Citizen Girl (2004)
- Dedication (2007)
- The Real Real (2009)
- Nanny Returns (2009)
- Cinderella Gets a Brazilian (2011)
- Over You (2012)
- The First Affair: A Novel (2013)
- How to be a Grown-Up: A Novel (2015)
