= Time Stands Still (play) =

Play written by Donald Margulies

- Original language: English
- Written by: Donald Margulies

Premiere
- Date: February 2009
- Place: Geffen Playhouse

Time Stands Still is a play written by Donald Margulies and directed by Daniel J. Sullivan. It was nominated for two Tony Awards for Best Play and Best Performance by a Leading Actress in a Play for Laura Linney.

== Synopsis ==
Time Stands Still is set in Brooklyn and revolves around Sarah, a photo journalist who has returned from covering the Iraq war after being injured by a roadside bomb, and her reporter boyfriend James who is swamped by guilt after leaving Sarah alone in Iraq. They receive a visit from their friend Richard, a photo editor, who introduces them to his new girlfriend Mandy, who is much younger than he. The play focuses on their relationships and Sarah and James' prospects at a more conventional life.

== Productions ==
Time Stands Still premiered in February 2009 at the Geffen Playhouse in Los Angeles and was the fourth collaboration for writer Donald Margulies and director Daniel J. Sullivan. It starred Anna Gunn as Sarah and David Harbour as James. Robin Thomas appeared as Richard, with Alicia Silverstone as Mandy. Margulies stated that the meaning of the play was "to capture a sense of the way we live now, to dramatize the things that thinking, feeling, moral people are thinking about and struggle with." The Los Angeles Times called it a "compelling if at times elusive drama" and praised Gunn's performance.

The play premiered on Broadway at the Samuel J. Friedman Theatre in a Manhattan Theatre Club production, on January 5, 2010 (previews), officially on January 28, 2010 and closed on March 27, 2010. The play was again directed by Daniel Sullivan. Alicia Silverstone reprised her role as Mandy, with Laura Linney starring as Sarah, Brian d'Arcy James as James and Eric Bogosian as Richard.

Charles Isherwood, The New York Times reviewer wrote, "the heart of Time Stands Still lies in the gently evolving relationship between Sarah and James, which develops troubling new ripples in each scene," and said Silverstone "brings warmth, actorly intelligence and delicate humor." The New York Daily News said Margulies "writes with intelligence and humor and creates dialogue that always hits the ear as real."

Time Stands Still opened again on Broadway at the Cort Theatre beginning September 23, 2010, with the official opening on October 7. Three of the four cast members returned. Alicia Silverstone had prior scheduling commitments and Christina Ricci played the role of Mandy. This production closed on January 30, 2011.

== Awards and nominations ==
=== Original Broadway production ===
Year	Award	Category	Nominee	Result
2010	Tony Award	Best Play		Nominated
2010	Tony Award	Best Actress in a Play	Laura Linney	Nominated
2010	Drama Desk Award	Outstanding Actress in a Play	Laura Linney	Nominated
