= Sight Unseen (play) =

- Original language: English
- Written by: Donald Margulies
- Subject: A celebrated American artist reunites with his former lover fifteen years after they parted ways
- Genre: Drama
- Setting: England

Premiere
- Date: September 1991
- Place: South Coast Repertory; Costa Mesa, California

Sight Unseen is a play by Donald Margulies. The play premiered at South Coast Repertory in 1991, and then was produced Off-Broadway in 1992 and on Broadway in 2004.

== Overview ==
Jonathan Waxman is a Brooklyn Jew who has become a wealthy artist whose works are bought sight unseen. Married with a pregnant wife, he travels to London for a retrospective of his work. While there, he decides to journey to the countryside to visit his former model and lover Patricia in the Norfolk farmhouse where she lives and works with her husband Nick, an English archaeologist. She married him to remain in England when her student visa expired.

Jonathan, whose father has recently died, is struggling with self-doubt and seeking to regain his artistic inspiration. While in England, he meets Grete, a young German scholar-journalist.

The play unfolds in a non-linear progression, with forward and backward jumps in time that eventually lead to the beginning of the relationship between Patricia and Jonathan, which ended without satisfactory closure.

== Productions ==
The play was commissioned and first staged by South Coast Repertory, Costa Mesa, California in September 1991. Directed by Micheal Bloom, the cast included Stephen Rowe (Jonathan Waxman), Randy Oglesby (Nick), Elizabeth Norment (Patricia) and Sabina Weber (Grete).

The Off-Broadway production by the Manhattan Theatre Club opened on January 7, 1992 at the company's Stage II, where it ran for 103 performances. It transferred to the Orpheum Theatre, running for an additional 190 performances. Michael Bloom directed a cast that included Dennis Boutsikaris as Jonathan, Deborah Hedwall as Patricia, and Jon De Vries as Nick. Laura Linney appeared in the small supporting role of Grete, a young German journalist. Lou Liberatore replaced Boutsikaris and Margaret Colin replaced Hedwall later in the run.

Margulies won the 1991-92 Obie Award for Best New American Play, and Boutsikaris and Hedwall received the 1991-1992 Obie Award, Performance. Linney won the Theatre World Award. Margulies was a finalist for the 1992 Pulitzer Prize for Drama, and was nominated for the Outer Critics Circle Award for Best Off-Broadway Play, and the John Gassner Award, presented to a new American playwright.

The play was produced at the Long Wharf Theatre, New Haven, Connecticut, in November 1993, directed by John Tillinger.

The play was revived on Broadway in a Manhattan Theatre Club production at the Biltmore Theatre, running from May 25, 2004 to July 25, 2004, for 70 performances. Directed by Daniel J. Sullivan the cast included Ben Shenkman as Jonathan, Laura Linney as Patricia, and Byron Jennings as Nick. Linney was nominated for the 2004 Tony Award for Best Performance by a Leading Actress in a Play and the Drama Desk Award for Outstanding Actress in a Play. Ben Brantley of The New York Times wrote:

Mr. Margulies, the author of The Loman Family Picnic and Dinner With Friends, has never been merely a satirist. His plays are usually about how time and memory transform feelings, relationships and the perception of the past. In scrambling chronology to consider the life and losses of Jonathan Waxman, Sight Unseen becomes a commentary on the sacrifices entailed in getting older and getting ahead.

== Awards and nominations ==
=== Original Off-Broadway production ===
Year	Award	Category	Nominee	Result
1992	Pulitzer Prize	Drama	Donald Margulies	Nominated
1992	Theatre World Award		Laura Linney	Won

=== 2004 Broadway production ===
Year	Award	Category	Nominee	Result
2005	Tony Award	Best Actress in a Play	Laura Linney	Nominated
