= Chicago Film Critics Association Awards 2015 =

Annual US film awards ceremony

28th Chicago Film Critics Association Awards
- Date: December 16, 2015
- Site: Chicago, Illinois U.S.

Highlights
- Best Film: Mad Max: Fury Road
- Most awards: Mad Max: Fury Road (5)
- Most nominations: Mad Max: Fury Road (7)

The 28th Chicago Film Critics Association Awards were announced on December 16, 2015. The awards honor the best in film for 2015. The nominations were announced on December 14. Mad Max: Fury Road received the most nominations (7), followed by Carol (6) and The Revenant (5).

== Winners and nominees ==
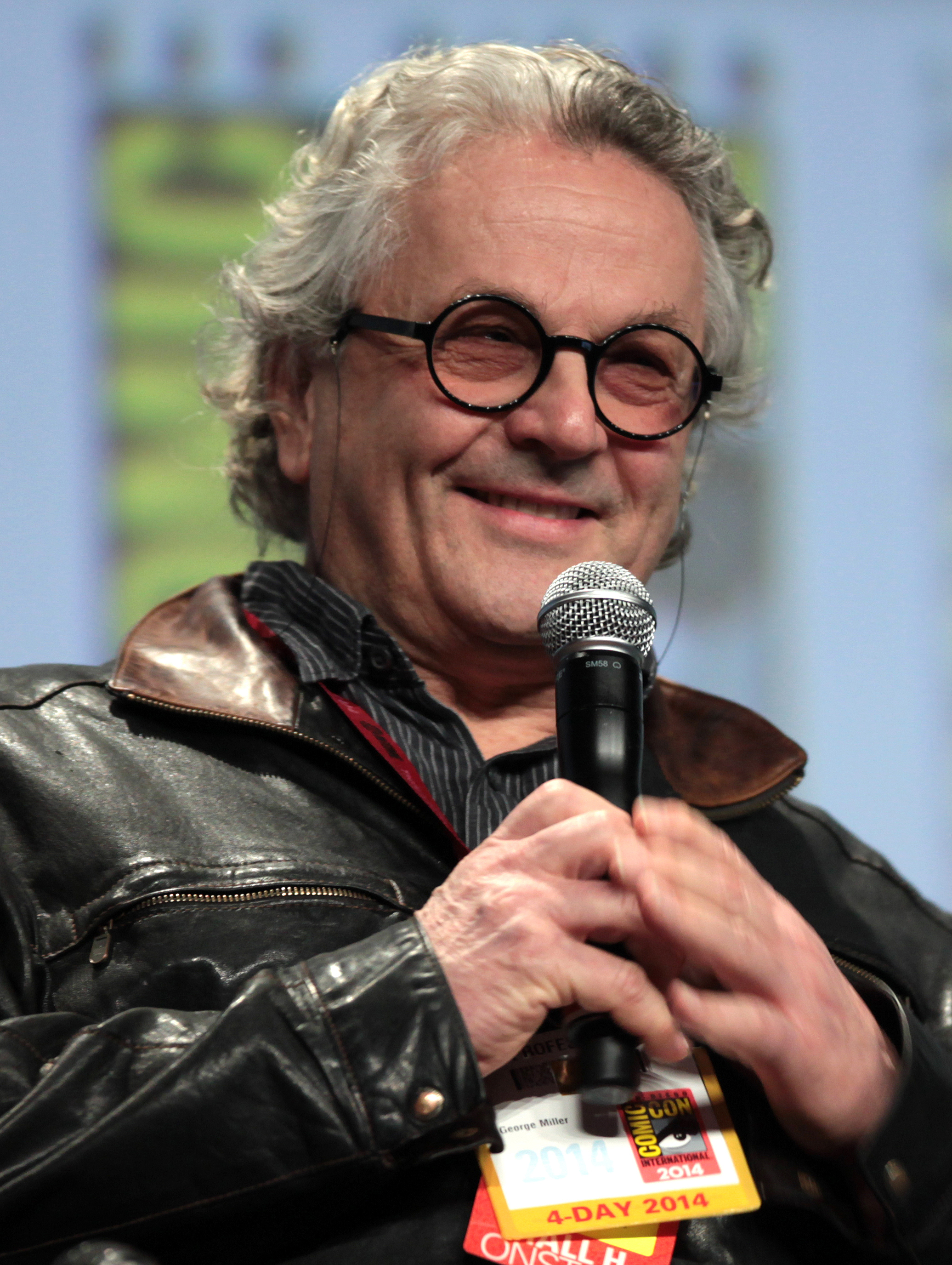
George Miller, Best Director winner

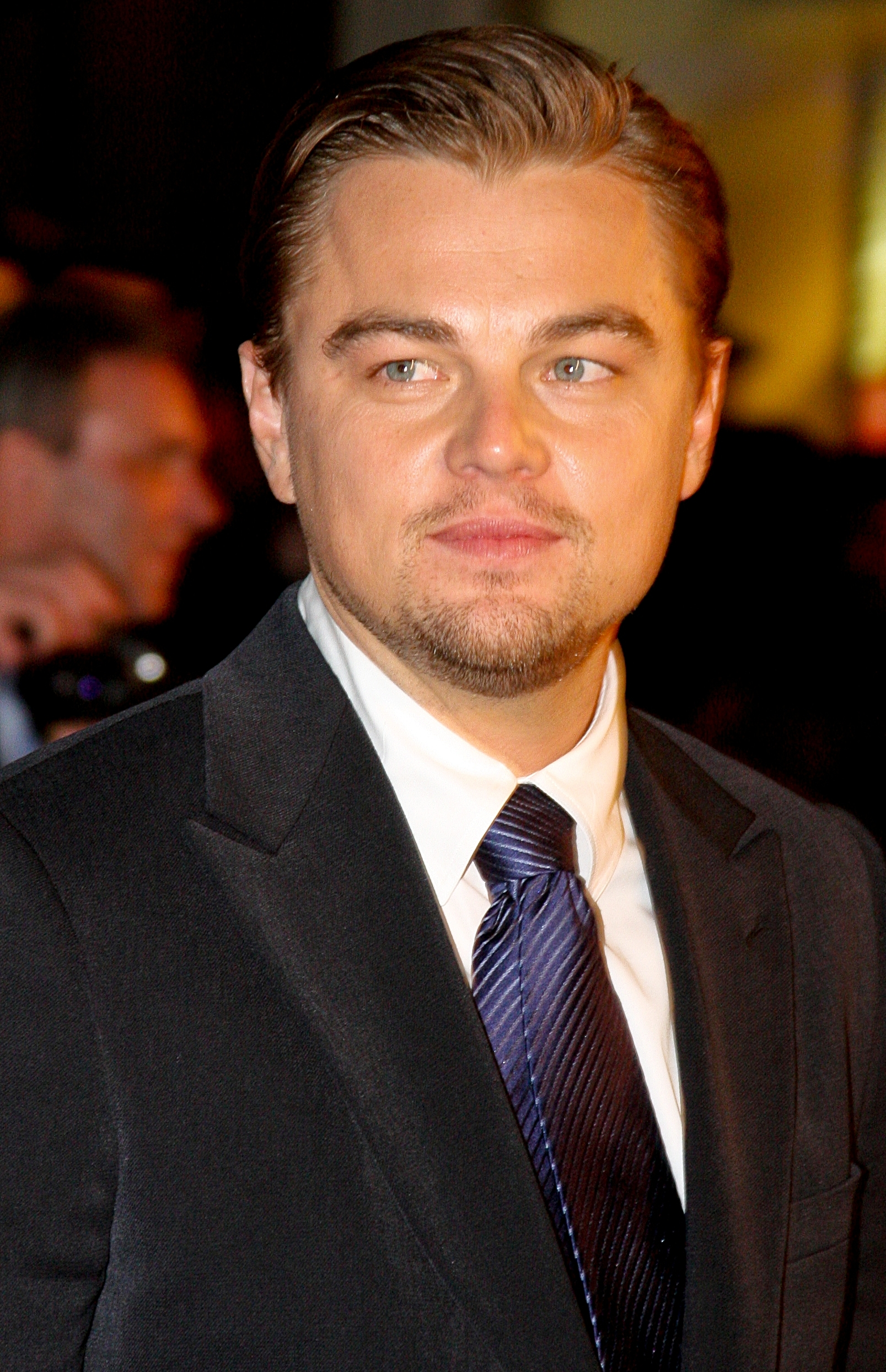
Leonardo DiCaprio, Best Actor winner

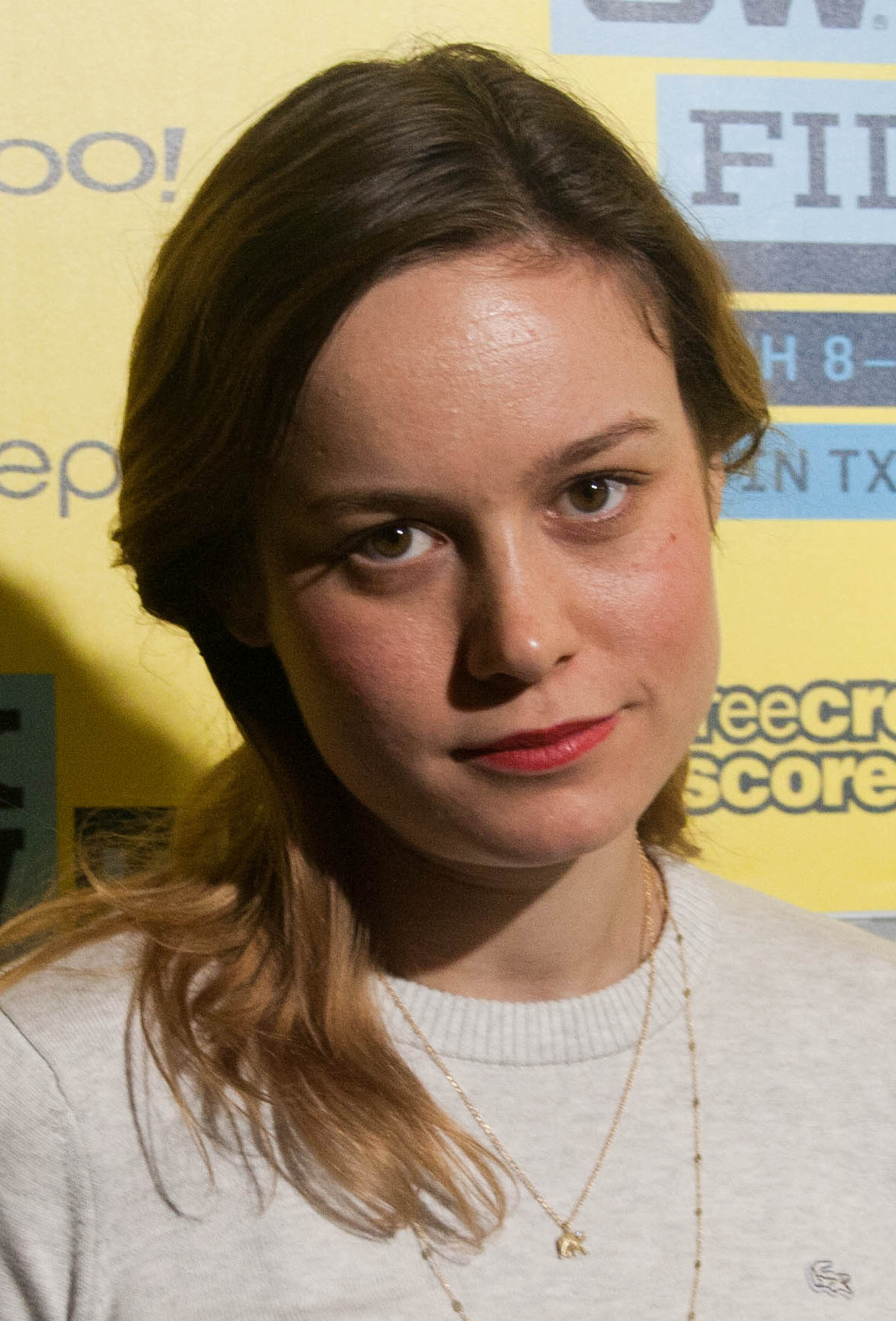
Brie Larson, Best Actress winner

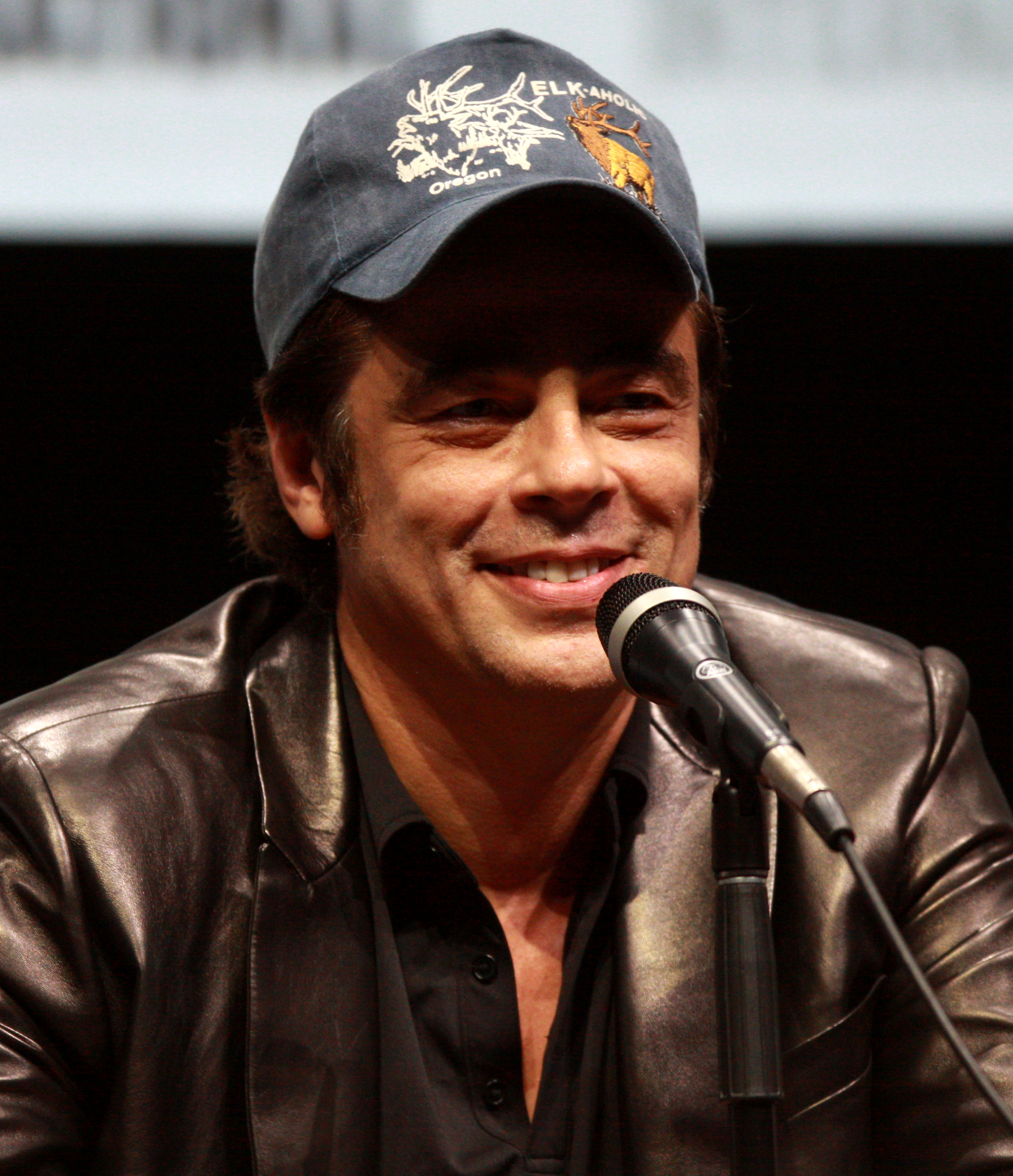
Benicio del Toro, Best Supporting Actor winner

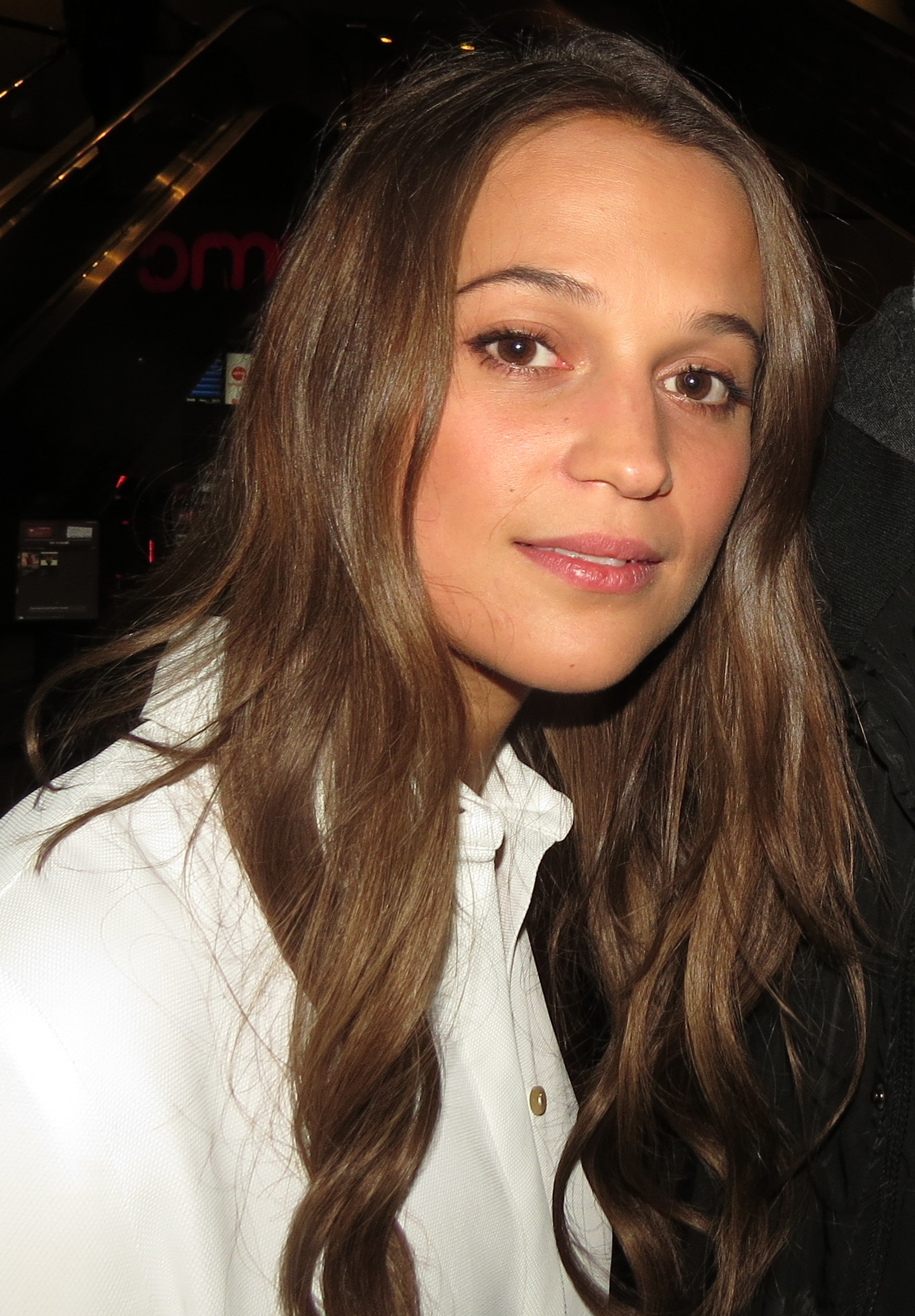
Alicia Vikander, Best Supporting Actress winner

The winners and nominees for the 28th Chicago Film Critics Association Awards are as follows:

=== Awards ===
Best Film	Best Director
Mad Max: Fury Road - Doug Mitchell and George Miller: Carol - Elizabeth Karlsen, Stephen Woolley and Christine Vachon; Inside Out - Pete Docter and Jonas Rivera; The Revenant - Arnon Milchan, Steve Golin, Alejandro G. Inarritu, Mary Parent and Keith Redmon; Spotlight - Michael Sugar, Steve Golin, Nicole Rocklin and Blye Pagon Faust	George Miller – Mad Max: Fury Road: Todd Haynes – Carol; Alejandro González Iñárritu – The Revenant; Tom McCarthy – Spotlight; Adam McKay – The Big Short
Best Actor	Best Actress
Leonardo DiCaprio – The Revenant as Hugh Glass: Christopher Abbott – James White as James White; Michael Fassbender – Steve Jobs as Steve Jobs; Eddie Redmayne – The Danish Girl as Lili Elbe; Jason Segel – The End of the Tour as David Foster Wallace	Brie Larson – Room as Joy "Ma" Newsome: Cate Blanchett – Carol as Carol Aird; Charlotte Rampling – 45 Years as Kate Mercer; Saoirse Ronan – Brooklyn as Eilis Lacey; Charlize Theron – Mad Max: Fury Road as Imperator Furiosa
Best Supporting Actor	Best Supporting Actress
Benicio del Toro – Sicario as Alejandro Gillick: Sam Elliott – Grandma as Karl; Mark Rylance – Bridge of Spies as Rudolf Abel; Michael Shannon – 99 Homes as Rick Carver; Sylvester Stallone – Creed as Rocky Balboa	Alicia Vikander – The Danish Girl as Gerda Wegener: Jennifer Jason Leigh – Anomalisa as Lisa Hesselman; Jennifer Jason Leigh – The Hateful Eight as Daisy Domergue; Cynthia Nixon – James White as Gail White; Kristen Stewart – Clouds of Sils Maria as Valentine
Best Original Screenplay	Best Adapted Screenplay
Spotlight – Tom McCarthy and Josh Singer: Bridge of Spies – Matt Charman and Joel and Ethan Coen; Ex Machina – Alex Garland; The Hateful Eight – Quentin Tarantino; Inside Out – Pete Docter, Meg LeFauve and Josh Cooley	The Big Short – Adam McKay and Charles Randolph based on the book by Michael Lewis: Anomalisa – Charlie Kaufman based on the audio play by Francis Fregoli; Brooklyn – Nick Hornby based on the novel by Colm Toibin; Room – Emma Donoghue based on the novel; Steve Jobs – Aaron Sorkin based on the biography by Walter Isaacson
Best Animated Film	Best Foreign Language Film
Inside Out - Peter Docter and Jonas Rivera: Anomalisa - Charlie Kaurman, Duke Johnson and Rosa Tran; The Good Dinosaur - Peter Sohn and Denise Ream; The Peanuts Movie - Steve Martino, Craig Schultz, Bryan Schultz, Cornelius Uliano, Paul Feig and Michael J. Travers; Shaun the Sheep Movie - Mark Burton, Richard Starzak, Paul Kewley and Julie Lockhart	Son of Saul (Hungary) in Hungarian - Directed by Laszlo Nemes: The Assassin (China) in Mandarin - Directed by Hou Hsiao-hsien; The Look of Silence (Indonesia) in Indonesian - Directed by Joshua Oppenheimer; Phoenix (Germany) in German - Directed by Christian Petzold; White God (Hungary) in Hungarian - Directed by Kornel Mundruczo
Best Documentary	Best Original Score
Amy - Asif Kapadia and James Gay-Rees: Cartel Land - Matthew Heineman and Tom Yellin; The Hunting Ground - Kirby Dick and Amy Ziering; The Look of Silence - Joshua Oppenheimer and Signe Byrge Sorensen; Where to Invade Next - Michael Moore	The Hateful Eight – Ennio Morricone: Carol – Carter Burwell; Inside Out – Michael Giacchino; It Follows – Disasterpeace; Mad Max: Fury Road – Junkie XL
Best Production Design	Best Editing
Mad Max: Fury Road - Production Design: Colin Gibson; Set Decoration: Lisa Thompson: The Assassin - Production Design: Ding-Yang Weng; Set Decoration: -; Brooklyn - Production Design: François Séguin, Irene O'Brien and Robert Parle; Set Decoration: -; Carol - Production Design: Jesse Rosenthal; Set Decoration: Heather Loeffler; Crimson Peak - Production Design: Thomas E. Sanders; Set Decoration: Jeffrey A. Melvin and Shane Vieau	Mad Max: Fury Road – Jason Ballantine and Margaret Sixel: The Big Short – Hank Corwin; The Martian – Pietro Scalia; The Revenant – Stephen Mirrione; Spotlight – Tom McArdle
Best Cinematography	
Mad Max: Fury Road – John Seale: Carol – Edward Lachman; The Hateful Eight – Robert Richardson; The Revenant – Emmanuel Lubezki; Sicario – Roger Deakins
Most Promising Filmmaker	Most Promising Performer
Alex Garland – Ex Machina: Marielle Heller – The Diary of a Teenage Girl; Josh Mond – James White; Laszlo Nemes – Son of Saul; Bill Pohlad – Love & Mercy	Jacob Tremblay – Room as Jack Newsom: Christopher Abbott – James White as James White; Bel Powley – The Diary of a Teenage Girl as Minnie Goetze; Geza Rohrig – Son of Saul as Saul; Amy Schumer – Trainwreck as Amy Townsend

== Awards breakdown ==
The following films received multiple nominations:

Nominations	Film
7	Mad Max: Fury Road
6	Carol
5	The Revenant
4	Spotlight
4	The Hateful Eight
3	Room
3	Anomalisa
3	The Big Short
3	Son of Saul
3	Inside Out
3	James White
2	Steve Jobs
2	Sicario
2	The Diary of a Teenage Girl
2	Bridge of Spies
2	The Danish Girl
2	Ex Manchina
2	The Assassin
2	The Look of Silence

The following films received multiple wins:

Wins	Film
5	Mad Max: Fury Road
2	Room
