= Jay Will (actor) =

American actor

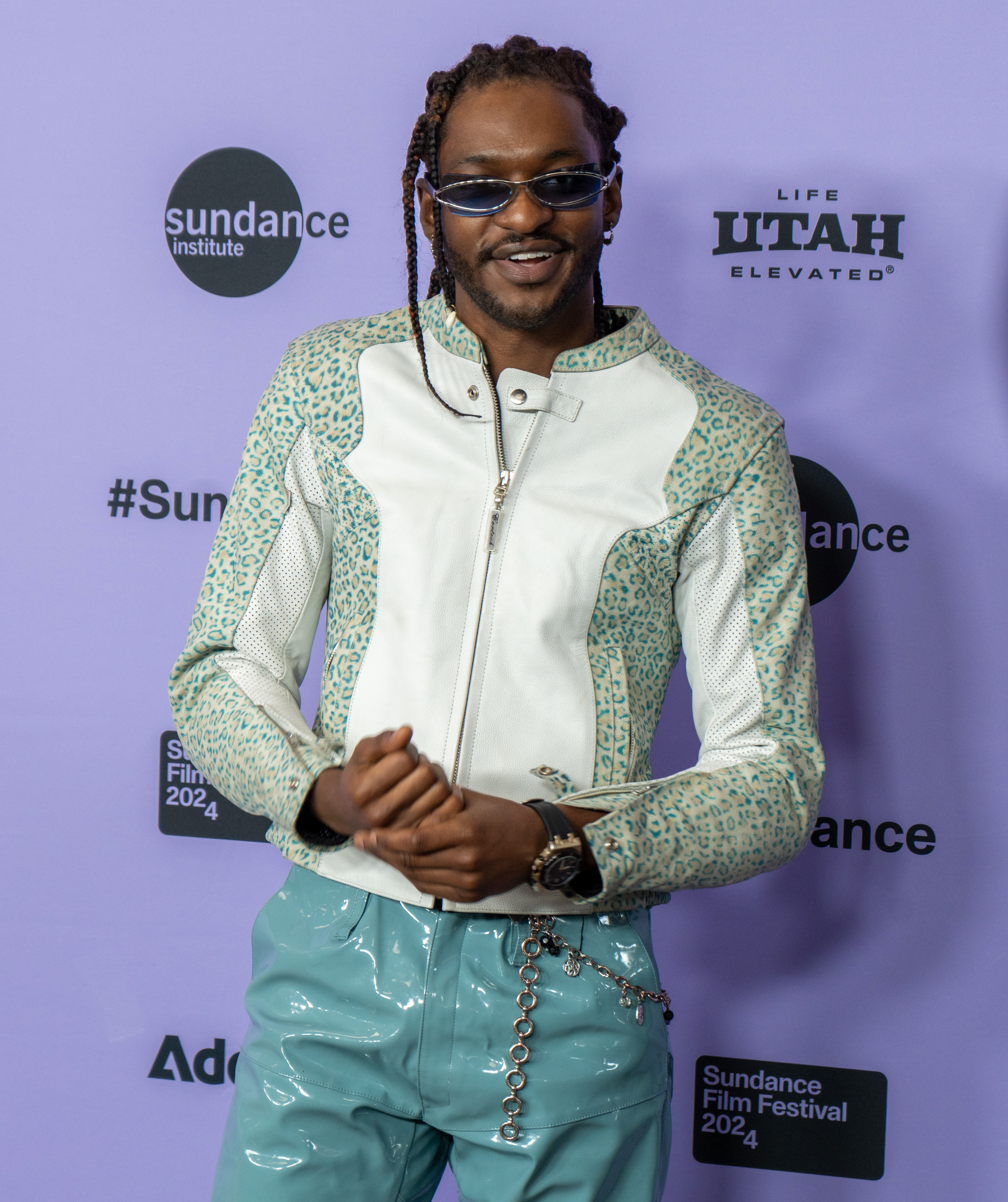
- Born: Jarrett Williams; Greenville, South Carolina, U.S.
- Education: Juilliard School
- Occupations: Actor; rapper; musician
- Years active: 2014–present

Jay Will is an American actor, rapper and musician. He is known for his role as Tyson in Paramount+'s Tulsa King (2022–present).

== Early life ==
From Greenville, South Carolina, he is an actor, rapper and musician and graduated from Juilliard School.

== Career ==
On television, he featured in Amazon Prime Video series The Marvelous Mrs. Maisel and had a main role in the first series of Taylor Sheridan and Sylvester Stallone series Tulsa King on Paramount+ as Tyson.

He played the titular role of Rob Peace in Chiwetel Ejiofor 2024 film Rob Peace, with co-stars Mary J. Blige and Camila Cabello. The film premiered at the 2024 Sundance Film Festival. He received praise for his performance, described as "moving" and "masterfully played" and a "breakthrough role".

He features as Alvaro in the Josh Mond 2024 film It Doesn’t Matter alongside Christopher Abbott. Shot in a mockumentary style, both lead actors filmed part of the film themselves.

== Filmography ==
=== Film ===
| Year | Title | Role | Notes |
|---|---|---|---|
| 2024 | Rob Peace | Rob Peace | Leading role |
| 2024 | It Doesn't Matter | Alvaro | Leading role |

=== Television ===
| Year | Title | Role | Notes |
|---|---|---|---|
| 2022 | Evil | Phoebus | Episode: "The Demon of Memes" |
| 2022 | The Marvelous Mrs. Maisel | James | 4 episodes |
| 2022–present | Tulsa King | Tyson Mitchell | 34 episodes |
