= It Doesn't Matter (film) =

- Directed by: Josh Mond
- Screenplay by: Josh Mond; Oscar Bodden Gonzalez; Alice de Matha
- Produced by: Alice de Matha; Josh Mond; Oscar Bodden Gonzalez; Odessa Rae; George Beno
- Starring: Christopher Abbott; Jay Will
- Edited by: Alice de Matha
- Music by: Clams Casino
- Animation by: Anthony F. Schepperd
- Production companies: CHMOND Inc; Films AdeMD
- Release date: May 16, 2024 (2024 Cannes Film Festival)
- Running time: 86 minutes
- Countries: United States; France
- Language: English

It Doesn't Matter is a 2024 American-French drama film directed by Josh Mond, starring Christopher Abbott and Jay Will. The film premiered on 16 May 2024 in the ACID section of the 2024 Cannes Film Festival.

== Premise ==
The film follows Alvaro, a man from Staten Island, and his relationship with his friend Chris, a young filmmaker. Over the course of seven years, Alvaro travels across the United States while confronting the circumstances that have left him struggling and attempting to rebuild his life.

== Cast ==
- Christopher Abbott as Chris
- Jay Will as Alvaro

== Production ==
Mond began developing the film following his 2015 feature film James White. The film was developed as a collaboration between Mond, writers and producers Alice de Matha and Oscar Bodden Gonzalez, and other collaborators.

Although fictional, the film uses a first-person perspective, handheld camerawork and a video-blog aesthetic. The production incorporated footage filmed by the actors and members of the filmmaking team, contributing to a documentary-like style.

The film was made over a period of seven years. Mond collaborated with animator Anthony F. Schepperd and the London-based company Blind Pig on the film's animated sequences.

== Release ==
It Doesn't Matter was selected for the 2024 program of ACID, a parallel section of the Cannes Film Festival organized by the Association for the Distribution of Independent Cinema. It had its world premiere in Cannes on 16 May 2024.

The film was subsequently screened at the Champs-Élysées Film Festival in June 2024 as part of the ACID program.

== Reception ==
The film received mixed reviews from critics. The Film Stage gave it a B−, while ScreenAnarchy praised Mond's handling of the characters' relationship. Le Monde described the film as depicting Alvaro's fragmented life through footage filmed during his travels across the United States.
