= Tulsa King =

2022 American crime drama television series

- Talsu Čigāns Title card
- Genre: Comedy drama; Crime drama
- Created by: Taylor Sheridan
- Showrunners: Terence Winter; Dave Erickson
- Starring: Sylvester Stallone; Andrea Savage; Martin Starr; Jay Will; Max Casella; Domenick Lombardozzi; Vincent Piazza; A.C. Peterson; Garrett Hedlund; Dana Delany; Tatiana Zappardino; Annabella Sciorra; Neal McDonough; Frank Grillo; Chris Caldovino; McKenna Quigley Harrington; Mike Walden; Beau Knapp; Robert Patrick; Bella Heathcote; Kevin Pollak; Gretchen Mol
- Theme music composer: Danny Bensi; Saunder Jurriaans
- Opening theme: Tulsa King (Official Theme)
- Country of origin: United States
- Original language: English
- No. of seasons: 4
- No. of episodes: 35

Production
- Executive producers: Taylor Sheridan; Terence Winter; Sylvester Stallone; David C. Glasser; Ronald Burkle; Bob Yari; David Hutkin; Allen Coulter; Braden Aftergood; Craig Zisk
- Running time: 36–47 minutes
- Production companies: 101 Studios; Bosque Ranch Productions; Cold Front Productions; Square Head Pictures; Balboa Productions; Paramount Television Studios (Note: Known as MTV Entertainment Studios for seasons 1–2)

Original release
- Network: Paramount+
- Release: November 13, 2022 – present

Related
- Frisco King

Tulsa King is an American comedy and crime drama television series created by Taylor Sheridan for the streaming platform Paramount+. The series stars Sylvester Stallone as Dwight "The General" Manfredi, an American Mafia caporegime who has been recently released from prison in New York and is sent to Tulsa, Oklahoma, where he begins to set up a criminal organization. It is Stallone's first leading role in a scripted television series.

The series also stars Andrea Savage, Martin Starr, Jay Will, Max Casella, Domenick Lombardozzi, Vincent Piazza, A.C. Peterson, Garrett Hedlund, and Dana Delany. After receiving an early premiere in theaters on October 29, 2022, the series was released on Paramount+ from November 13, 2022, to January 8, 2023. Shortly after premiering, Tulsa King was renewed for a second season, which premiered on September 15, 2024 and concluded on November 17. The third season premiered on September 21, 2025 and concluded on November 23. The fourth season premiered on October 16, 2026. In October 2026, ahead of the fourth season's premiere, the series was renewed for a fifth season.

Terence Winter was the showrunner for the first season, but due to differences with Sheridan, he was demoted to head writer before the second, while director Craig Zisk produced the second season. Dave Erickson took over as showrunner for the third season. The first season was largely filmed in Oklahoma City, but primary production on the second season relocated to Atlanta after the cast and crew complained. Annabella Sciorra, Tatiana Zappardino, Frank Grillo, and Neal McDonough joined the second-season main cast. Paramount later confirmed the third season renewal by announcing the start of production. A fourth season as well as a spin-off series called Frisco King which will star Samuel L. Jackson, have both been ordered.

The series has proved to be a success by providing a television ratings boost during its broadcast on Paramount Network and setting viewership records on Paramount+. Critics have given Tulsa King generally positive reviews. Many have praised Stallone's performance, but some criticized the dialogue and overall story arc. In 2023, Tulsa King was nominated for a Primetime Creative Arts Emmy Award.

== Premise ==
In the first season, after serving 25 years in federal prison, Dwight "The General" Manfredi, an American Mafia capo from New York City, is exiled to Tulsa, Oklahoma to establish criminal operations there. Dwight builds his own criminal empire with a diverse crew, including loyal taxi driver Tyson Mitchell and marijuana dispensary owner Bodhi. Dwight also opens the Bred-2Buck casino as a front business with bar owner Mitch Keller for their money laundering and illegal gambling operations. As his enterprise expands, he clashes with the Black Macadams biker gang, led by violent president, Caolan Waltrip. He also navigates a complicated romance with ATF agent Stacy Beale, ultimately setting the stage for a war with the syndicate back home.

In the second season, after establishing his Tulsa empire, Dwight finds his businesses targeted by powerful new forces. Oklahoma billionaire and corrupt oil tycoon Cal Thresher teams up with Jackie Ming—a violent, psychopathic crime boss linked to the Chinese Triads, an international crime syndicate—to wage a brutal campaign to squeeze Dwight out. Simultaneously, a fractured New York Mafia and the volatile Kansas City boss Bill Bevilaqua attempt to muscle in on his wealth, dragging Dwight into a multi-front war of corporate sabotage, triad brutality, and escalating federal pressure.

In the third season, Dwight pivots to premium bourbon whiskey as a new business venture, using regional distribution to expand his criminal enterprise. However, this national growth earns him the wrath of Jeremiah Dunmire, Tulsa's ruthless, God-fearing Dixie Mafia boss and a rival liquor businessman and his son, Cole. Aided by an unexpected new ally, Russell Lee Washington, Dwight must also contend with New York mafia kingpin Ray Renzetti and an aggressive FBI coercive manipulation plot. With betrayals mounting, Dwight and his crew face their ultimate test to keep the Tulsa empire from danger.

In the fourth season, Dwight Manfredi fights to legitimize his empire, only to be hit from every direction by corrupt politicians, dangerous new enemies, and a crushing personal loss. As scheming Governor Amanda Clark uses her office to dismantle his legal front businesses, Dwight faces a brutal war on the streets against English Dan, a ruthless British drug lord, and Quick Rick, an unpredictable rapper turned criminal. With New York mob boss Quiet Ray threatening a violent takeover from the outside, Dwight is forced to confront harsh realities about loyalty and leadership. As his dark New York instincts resurface, he transforms Tulsa into a battleground, demonstrating his formidable presence as an adversary.

== Cast and characters ==
=== Overview ===
Actor	Character	Seasons			
Actor	Character	1	2	3	4
Sylvester Stallone	Dwight Manfredi	Main	Main	Main	Main
Andrea Savage	Stacy Beale	Main	Main		
Martin Starr	Lawrence "Bodhi" Geigerman	Main	Main	Main	Main
Jay Will	Tyson Mitchell	Main	Main	Main	Main
Max Casella	Armand "Manny" Truisi	Main	Main		
Domenick Lombardozzi	Chickie Invernizzi	Main	Main		
Vincent Piazza	Vince Antonacci	Main	Main	Main	Main
A.C. Peterson	Pete Invernizzi	Main			
Garrett Hedlund	Mitch Keller	Main	Main	Main	Main
Dana Delany	Margaret Deveraux	Main	Main	Main	Main
Tatiana Zappardino	Tina Manfredi-Grieger	Recurring	Main		
Annabella Sciorra	Joanne Manfredi	Recurring	Main	Main	Main
Neal McDonough	Cal Thresher		Main	Main	Main
Frank Grillo	Bill Bevilaqua		Main	Main	Main
Chris Caldovino	Goodie Carangi	Recurring	Recurring	Main	Main
McKenna Quigley Harrington	Grace	Recurring	Recurring	Main	Main
Mike "Ca$h Flo" Walden	Bigfoot		Recurring	Main	Main
Beau Knapp	Cole Dunmire			Main	
Robert Patrick	Jeremiah Dunmire			Main	
Bella Heathcote	Cleo Montague			Main	
Kevin Pollak	John Musso			Main	Main
James Russo	"Quiet" Ray Renzetti			Recurring	Main
Gretchen Mol	Amanda Clark				Main

=== Main ===
- Sylvester Stallone as Dwight "The General" Manfredi, a capo in the Invernizzi family who is sent to Tulsa after serving 25 years in prison, and forms his own syndicate
- Andrea Savage as Stacy Beale (seasons 1–2), Manfredi's former love interest and a senior ATF agent. She is transferred to Alaska as punishment for failing to secure a conviction of Dwight.
- Martin Starr as Lawrence "Bodhi" Geigerman, a marijuana dealer who Manfredi recruits as main syndicate financier, associate of the Manfredi family
- Jay Will as Tyson Mitchell, Dwight's driver and associate of the Manfredi family
- Max Casella as Armand "Manny" Truisi (seasons 1–2), a former Invernizzi soldier who made a new life in Tulsa working at Fennario horse ranch. He joins Manfredi's crew as a soldier
- Domenick Lombardozzi as Don Charles "Chickie" Invernizzi (seasons 1–2), underboss and later boss of the Invernizzi family
- Vincent Piazza as Vince Antonacci, (Note: From season 3, Piazza is only credited as a series regular in the episodes he appears in. In all other episodes, he is not credited and does not appear.) Chickie's top capo, and later consigliere and boss
- A.C. Peterson as Pete "The Rock" Invernizzi (season 1), the ailing boss of the Invernizzi family
- Garrett Hedlund as Mitch "the Stick" Keller, ex-convict and bar owner who is an associate of the Manfredi syndicate
- Dana Delany as Margaret Devereaux (seasons 1–4), Dwight's girlfriend and the owner of Fennario horse ranch.
- Tatiana Zappardino as Tina Manfredi-Grieger (season 2; recurring season 1), a Brooklyn florist and Dwight's estranged daughter
- Annabella Sciorra as Joanne Manfredi (season 2–present; recurring season 1), Dwight's younger sister
- Neal McDonough as Cal Thresher (seasons 2–4), (Note: In season 3, McDonough is only credited as a series regular in the episodes he appears in. In all other episodes, he is not credited and does not appear.) a corrupt billionaire businessman turned politician
- Frank Grillo as Bill Bevilaqua (season 2–present), (Note: In season 3, Grillo is only credited as a series regular in the episodes he appears in. In all other episodes, he is not credited and does not appear.) boss of the Kansas City Mob
- Chris Caldovino as Dennis "Goodie" Carangi (season 3–present; recurring seasons 1–2), long-time capo and consigliere of the Invernizzi family who joins Manfredi in Tulsa
- McKenna Quigley Harrington as Grace (season 3–present; recurring seasons 1–2), associate of the Manfredi family
- Mike "Ca$h Flo" Walden as Michael "Bigfoot" (season 3–present; recurring season 2), associate, enforcer and bodyguard of the Manfredi family
- Beau Knapp as Cole Dunmire (season 3), Jeremiah's son and Mitch's rival
- Robert Patrick as Jeremiah Dunmire (season 3), the so-called "tyrant of Tulsa", the leader of the Dixie Mafia
- Bella Heathcote as Cleo Montague (season 3), (Note: Heathcote is only credited as a series regular in the episodes she appears in. In all other episodes, she is not credited and does not appear.) the rebellious daughter of Theodore Montague and Mitch's old flame
- Kevin Pollak as FBI Agent John Musso (season 3–present), (Note: In season 3, Pollak is only credited as a series regular in the episodes he appears in. In all other episodes, he is not credited and does not appear.) the special agent in charge of handling Dwight as an asset following his detainment
- James Russo as "Quiet" Ray Renzetti (season 4; recurring season 3), an old-school Italian mafia kingpin
- Gretchen Mol as Amanda Clark (season 4), Cal's by-the-book Lieutenant Governor who later becomes Governor

=== Recurring ===
- Miles Mussenden as Hendricks (season 1; guest season 2), the Assistant Special Agent in Charge or ASAC of the ATF Tulsa Bureau office
- Scarlet Rose Stallone as Spencer, a former caretaker at Margaret's ranch employed as a bartender by Dwight
- Dashiell Connery as Clint, associate of Manfredi family
- Justin Garcia-Pruneda as Fred, associate of Manfredi family
- Michael Beach as Mark Mitchell (seasons 1–2; guest season 3), Tyson's father
- Emily Davis as Rochelle "Roxy" Harrington (season 1), Manny's co-worker and an informant for Stacy
- Glen Gould as Jimmy "the Creek" (seasons 1–2), associate of Manfredi family, marijuana producer and distributor
- Loren Dunn as Emory (season 1), Tina's husband
- Ritchie Coster as Caolan Waltrip (season 1), the Irish boss of the outlaw biker gang Black Macadams MC
- Robert Walker Branchaud as Carson Pike (season 1), member of the Black Macadams gang
- Joseph Riccobene as Jerry Izzo (seasons 1–2), a capo in the Invernizzi family
- Steve Witting as Donnie Shore (season 2; guest season 1), a car dealership owner
- Juliette Jeffers as Angie Mitchell (season 2; guest seasons 1 and 3), Tyson's mother
- Guy Nardulli as Johnny the Zip (season 2; guest seasons 1 and 3), a capo for the Invernizzi family
- Ron Castellano as Nicky D (season 2; guest season 1), a capo for the Invernizzi family
- Pierce Eckmann and Henry Eckmann as Cody and Ryan (seasons 1–2; guest season 3), Tina and Emory's twin son's and Dwight's grandsons
- Rich Ting as Jackie Ming (season 2), a Chinese triad gangster
- Stephen Shelton as Cowboy Art (season 2–present), one of Bevilaqua's top enforcers, who gets into conflict with Bodhi
- Dallas Roberts as Dexter Deacon (season 3), a hitman specializing in explosives
- Tim Guinee as A.G. Sackrider (season 3–present), the attorney general of Tulsa, who is in Dunmire's pocket now working for Amanda Clark
- Eden Lee as Maya Gordon (season 4), Clark's chief-of-staff
- Rhys Coiro as Leonardo "Lenny" Timpone (season 4), the owner of Beppe's, an elegant Italian restaurant in Tulsa
- Richie Stephens as English Dan (season 4), a ruthless drug lord
- Robert Davi as Turco (season 4), a veteran enforcer working for "Quiet" Ray
- Flula Borg as Bradley Van Heusen (season 4), a tech mogul and owner of an AI data farm funding Clark

=== Notable guests ===
- Stephanie Kurtzuba as Clara Truisi (seasons 1–3), Armand's wife
- Barry Corbin as Babe Keller (seasons 1, 3), Mitch's elderly dad
- Alan Autry as Brian Gillen (season 1), former owner of Fennario Ranch and Margaret Devereaux's ex-husband
- Jonathan Joss as "Bad Face" (season 1), associate of the Manfredi family
- Josh Fadem as Elliot Evans, a quirky, unconventional lawyer (season 1)
- Jelly Roll as himself (season 2)
- Graham Greene as Old Smoke (season 2), the Native American chieftain
- Brett Rice as Theodore Montague (season 3), the owner of a large distillery and Cleo's father
- Jayson Warner Smith as Walden Eustice (season 3), a licensed liquor distributor
- Samuel L. Jackson as Russell Lee Washington Jr. (season 3), (Note: Credited among the main cast as a special guest star in the final two episodes of season 3.) a crafty veteran hitman from New Orleans, who served time with Dwight
- Pat MacAfee as Detective Wozniak (season 4), a corrupt Tulsa Police detective formerly on English Dan's payroll who now works as a paid informant and evidence fixer for Dwight Manfredi.

== Episodes ==
=== Series overview ===
Season	Episodes	Originally released	
Season	Episodes	First released	Last released
1	9	November 13, 2022	January 8, 2023
2	10	September 15, 2024	November 17, 2024
3	10	September 21, 2025	November 23, 2025
4	10	October 16, 2026	December 18, 2026

=== Season 1 (2022–23) ===
No. overall	No. in season	Title	Directed by	Written by	Original release date
1	1	"Go West, Old Man"	Allen Coulter	Teleplay by : Taylor Sheridan and Terence Winter; Story by : Taylor Sheridan	November 13, 2022 (Note: This episode was first released in AMC Theatres on October 29–30 before its release on Paramount+.)
After serving 25 years for murder to protect the New York Invernizzi crime family, Dwight Manfredi is released from prison. Unaccustomed to modern technology, he meets boss Pete "The Rock" Invernizzi and his crew, only to be banished to Tulsa, Oklahoma. Furious at his abandonment, Dwight punches mafia capo Vince before reluctantly leaving. Upon arriving at Tulsa Airport, Dwight hires cab driver Tyson Mitchell as his personal chauffeur. Discovering a local marijuana dispensary illegally selling without mafia presence, Dwight knocks out Fred. He extorts owner Lawrence "Bodhi" Geigerman, threatening to break his foot for a 20% cut in exchange for protection. Dwight uses the cash to buy a Lincoln Navigator—confronting a racist Donnie in the process—and tells Bodhi to launder his cannabis proceeds. Dwight settles into The Mayo hotel and frequents the Bred 2 Buck saloon, bonding with owner Mitch, a fellow ex-convict. Meanwhile, Dwight has a one-night stand with a woman named Stacy, who abruptly leaves upon realizing he is 75. Unbeknownst to Dwight, Stacy is an ATF agent who gets uncomfortable after the FBI issues a bulletin to monitor him as he begins building his new criminal empire.
2	2	"Center of the Universe"	Allen Coulter	Terence Winter & Joseph Riccobene	November 20, 2022
Dwight attempts to look up his estranged daughter, Christina, but struggles in a modern cash-free world without a debit card or valid ID. Accompanying Dwight to a bank, Tyson advises him to update his expired driver's license. After cheating in an exam and bribing an official to expedite a test, Dwight obtains a permit and opens a bank account. Meanwhile, Stacy learns about Dwight's past from a colleague about his murders and visits his room to warn him that authorities are tracking his movements. Chickie demands Dwight pay $100,000 to settle his dispute with Vince, which Dwight reluctantly agrees to send. In Tulsa, Armand discovers Dwight's presence and fears Dwight was sent to kill him. Tyson's father expresses concern over his son associating with a gangster. Dwight accompanies Bodhi to meet his Creek Indian supplier, Jimmy. Educated on legal marijuana, Dwight negotiates a significantly cheaper bulk rate for higher-quality products. Later, using his new debit card, Dwight pays to access Christina's contact details and calls her. Christina speaks to him briefly but refuses a full conversation, devastated by their 18-year estrangement. A remorseful Dwight retreats to Tulsa's "Center of the Universe" to reflect on his failure as a father.
3	3	"Caprice"	Ben Richardson	Regina Corrado	November 27, 2022
An ATF investigation into Caolan Waltrip's Black Macadams biker gang begins after member Edgar Dumont dies by suicide using explosives. Capitalizing on an upcoming music festival, Dwight teams up with Bodhi and Mitch to sell nitrous oxide as a party drug, using Mitch's bar to order supplies in bulk without raising suspicion. Meanwhile, Armand (Manny) attempts to shoot Dwight during his driving test, but Dwight survives. The police interrogate Dwight; Stacy later reconnects with Dwight over dinner, and they sleep together again. Dwight calls Chickie, who denies involvement in the shooting. Determined to find his attacker, Dwight gets a partial license plate number from Paul, his panicked instructor, and visits him in the hospital, and bribes him with £10,000 to trace it. Dwight tries to fire Tyson to protect him from the danger, but Tyson, enjoying the gangster life, refuses the severance pay and insists on staying as his right-hand man. Clues left in the burned getaway car—DMSO horse liniment and fire-retardant fabric—lead Dwight to Fennario Ranch. Dwight visits the owner, Margaret Devereaux, to investigate her staff. After tracking Armand home, Dwight prepares to shoot him, but hesitates after seeing Armand embrace his young son.
4	4	"Visitation Place"	Ben Semanoff	Dave Flebotte	December 4, 2022
Dwight corners Armand when he is alone and questions him. Armand reveals the Invernizzis previously tried to assassinate Dwight in prison, and Armand confesses he shot at Dwight out of fear Dwight was sent to kill him. Sparing him, Dwight demands weekly extortion payments of $300. Dwight's nitrous oxide operation hits a setback when members of the Black Macadam biker gang, who are selling drugs at the same festival, brutally beat Bodhi and Tyson, stealing their money and gas tanks. Dwight gathers his crew—joined by Tyson's father, Mark, who insists on protecting his son—to retaliate. Arming themselves with baseball bats, they ambush and assault the bikers, reclaiming their cash and gas tanks. Meanwhile, Stacy picks up a stranger at a bar and spends the night with him, having intercourse. Tyson and his father reconcile, but Tyson finds himself divided between his family and his loyalty to Dwight. Dwight's plan is further complicated by personal tragedy. With help from his sister Joanne, Dwight shares a poignant over-the-phone farewell with his dying younger brother, Joey, offering comforting childhood memories. Meanwhile, Armand decides to stay in Tulsa and violently confronts a rude neighbour.
5	5	"Token Joe"	Ben Semanoff	Joseph Riccobene	December 11, 2022
Dwight travels to New York for his brother Joey's funeral, attempting to reconcile with his estranged daughter, Tina, who refuses to forgive her father. Meanwhile in Tulsa, corrupt police officers on the payroll of Caolan Waltrip, leader of the Black Macadam biker gang, arrest Tyson and confiscate his phone. After forcing Tyson to reveal his passcode, the bikers locate and abduct Bodhi. Bodhi admits Dwight is extorting him and directs them to Mitch's bar, who is fronting his drug racket. When the corrupt officers attempt to intimidate Mitch, he forces them to release Bodhi and leave, pointing out that his establishment sits on Cherokee land outside their jurisdiction. Elsewhere, Armand's colleague Roxy, whose boyfriend is Black Macadam's sergeant-at-arms, warns Armand that the biker gang brutally eliminates anyone who encroaches on their territory. Dwight meets Tina, who reveals that during his 25-year prison sentence, Chickie's associate Nico sexually assaulted her, despite boss Pete's promise to protect Dwight's family. In the hospital, Dwight confronts Pete, who is unaware of Nico and Tina's incident. Furious at the betrayal, Dwight viciously beats Nico and eventually kills him at a local club in front of Chickie and Vince.
6	6	"Stable"	Guy Ferland	Dave Flebotte	December 18, 2022
Roxy, a confidential informant for the ATF, confides with Stacey and Hendricks regarding the escalating territorial feud between Dwight and Caolan Waltrip's Black Macadam biker gang. Before returning to Tulsa, Dwight meets with his daughter Tina and admits to murdering her attacker, Nico. Back in New York, Pete forbids any retaliation against Dwight or his family. Upon his return, Dwight meets with Waltrip and flatly rejects his demand for a cut of his business. Stacy warns Dwight that the FBI is actively tracking his activities, while federal agents raid Bodhi's dispensary to seize his products; nevertheless, Bodhi remains loyal after Dwight secretly secures his assets (cash and marijuana) beforehand. Upon learning that Pilot, a roaming white horse he has grown fond of, faces euthanization, Dwight purchases the horse and hires barista Spencer, who loves horses, to care for him. A vengeful Chickie secretly tracks down and brutally assaults Tina's husband, Emory. Tensions boil over when Waltrip sends Carson Pike to shoot up Mitch's bar. Dwight and Mitch immediately return fire, shooting Pike dead. In the aftermath of the shootout, Mitch officially accepts Dwight as his business partner to rebuild and run the saloon together.
7	7	"Warr Acres"	Guy Ferland	Terence Winter & Joseph Riccobene	December 25, 2022
Dwight and Mitch dispose of Carson Pike's body on tribal land. Dwight finds out about Emory's assault, and tells Tina and the family to come to Tulsa, but she declines. Dwight and Mitch send his bloodied jacket back to the Black Macadams, upsetting Roxy. Meanwhile, Stacy urges Roxy to steal Caolan Waltrip's laptop. Roxy attempts the theft, but Waltrip catches her red-handed and brutally strangles her to death. In Tulsa, Goodie arrives from New York to assess Dwight's growing empire, and gets surprised to see Armand. Dwight pitches opening a casino inside the Bred 2 Buck saloon to launder money. To finance the venture, Bodhi reveals his secret $7 million cryptocurrency fraud operation and agrees to partner with Dwight and Mitch. Meanwhile, Chickie deeply resents his father's praise of Dwight. When Goodie reports that Dwight gave his Invernizzi pinky ring to Tyson, Pete grows suspicious. However, when Chickie confronts a dismissive Pete in the bathtub about destroying his life and college dreams, Chickie snaps and drowns Pete, seizing control of the family. After learning of Pete's death, a grieved Dwight realizes his ties to the Invernizzis are severed. Reeling from Roxy's murder, Stacy confronts Dwight about his violent actions.
8	8	"Adobe Walls"	Lodge Kerrigan	Terence Winter & Tom Sierchio	January 1, 2023
Preparing for war against Caolan Waltrip's Black Macadam biker gang, Dwight and Mitch train their crew in firearms while recruiting new tough guys. Stacy confronts Waltrip over Roxy's murder and later manages to get his bank accounts frozen, though Agent Ruiz reveals the FBI is tracking Dwight. Bodhi and Jimmy the Creek agree to open a casino behind the Bred 2 Buck saloon on Cherokee land in exchange for a 20% cut. In New York, Chickie takes over the crime family after Pete's death and falsely offers Dwight a truce, plotting to ambush him in Tulsa. A desperate, cocaine-fuelled Waltrip orders the corrupt police officers to arrest Dwight, but Dwight intimidates them into backing down. Between confrontations with Margaret's hostile ex-husband Brian, Dwight advises Tina to postpone her family's move to Tulsa for safety. Tensions culminate when Stacy meets Dwight outside his hotel to warn him that a warrant is out for Waltrip. Suddenly, Waltrip and his lieutenant launch a drive-by shooting at them. Dwight and Stacy return fire, killing the lieutenant, but Waltrip shoots Stacy in the stomach and escapes. Dwight hands his gun to Tyson to hide before police detain him for questioning.
9	9	"Happy Trails"	Lodge Kerrigan	Terence Winter	January 8, 2023
In 1997, Chickie, Vince and Armand are torturing Ripple, who is handcuffed to a radiator. Chickie's torture leads to the room getting engulfed in fire. Dwight shot Ripple out of mercy to prevent him from dying in the fire and gets arrested. In the present, Chickie, Vince, and Goodie arrive in Tulsa. Dwight, Tyson and Armand confront them on a rooftop, declaring his independence and demanding that they leave. Dwight convinces Goodie to defect to Dwight's crew. Meanwhile, Bodhi remotely hacks Waltrip's computer and drains his $8 million fortune, enraging Waltrip. To make amends to Stacy, Dwight anonymously gifts her a flash drive containing $1 million. Seeking revenge, the Black Macadams invade the Bred 2 Buck saloon. Dwight's crew ambushes the gang in a bloody shootout, culminating in Dwight brutally killing Waltrip. Three months later, the saloon reopens, and Dwight spends time with Tina and his grandsons. Later, Stacy gets reinstated by the ATF on the condition that she turn in Dwight. Later, at the saloon, she betrays him. She hands the flash drive to federal agents as evidence of bribery, leaving Tina in tears as Dwight is arrested and driven away.

=== Season 2 (2024) ===
No. overall	No. in season	Title	Directed by	Written by	Original release date
10	1	"Back in the Saddle"	Craig Zisk	Taylor Elmore and Terence Winter & Sylvester Stallone	September 15, 2024
In jail, Dwight meets Harlan Thibodeaux, who has been incarcerated for an energy scam in which he gambled away a $12.5 million grant for a wind farm he owns. The next day, in the courthouse, Dwight negotiates his bail, with Tina paying $300,000. At the casino, Mitch introduces Dwight to his cousin, Bigfoot, whom Dwight hires as his personal bodyguard. Dwight also tells the group about Harlan's wind farm scam and decides to invest in it to power a new hydroponic weed farm; everyone agrees. While visiting the ranch, Margaret tells Dwight about a charity function organized by Cal Thresher, a wealthy and major medical marijuana supplier in Tulsa, and invites him to meet Thresher. Dwight then visits Stacy at her home and says he does not hold a grudge against her for having him arrested. The next day, the gang buys suits, and Dwight and the gang attend the function. Dwight meets with Thresher, who shows Dwight disdain for infringing on his business. Furious, Dwight decides to leave the function. Cal then calls upon Bill Bevilaqua, Kansas City mob boss, and inquires about Dwight, also mentioning that Dwight has now officially stepped into Bevilaqua's Tulsa territory.
11	2	"Kansas City Blues"	Craig Zisk	Stephen Scaia and Terence Winter	September 22, 2024
Dwight Manfredi continues building his life in Tulsa, joining his daughter Tina to look at a new family home. U.S. Attorney Dylan McGrath, pressured by local power broker Cal Thresher, joins the prosecution to aggressively incriminate Dwight and sabotage his acquittal chances. Choosing to represent himself in court, Dwight rejects a plea deal despite warnings from his visiting sister, Joanne, who has permanently relocated from New York. Bevilaqua falsely frames Dwight's expansion into Tulsa as an act of war, unaware that Chickie and Dwight have already parted ways. Armand confides in Tyson about his financial struggles, and the two, along with the crew, pull off a successful heist, stealing catalytic converters from Donnie's dealership. Dwight visits Harlan in prison to negotiate the purchase of his farms for $7.5 million, but they struggle with securing bank financing. While at Dylan's office, Dwight discovers evidence of Dylan and Cal's collusion, raising doubts about Dylan's true motives. At the dispensary's successful grand opening, Dwight is forced to hide at Tyson's house due to media attention. The next day, he learns that Cal, Bevilaqua, and now the Chinese Triads are threats. Meanwhile, Chickie tries to recruit Goodie to betray Dwight in exchange for power.
12	3	"Oklahoma v. Manfredi"	Joshua Marston	Terence Winter & Joseph Riccobene	September 29, 2024
As Dwight prepares for his federal bribery trial, Armand struggles with a bitter divorce and secretly takes a £30,000 cash payout from Cal in exchange for information on Dwight's operations. Meanwhile, Dwight, Joanne and Tina move into a new neighbourhood, where he frequently clashes with an overly strict Homeowners Association president over petty rule violations. Goodie faces pressure from Chickie and Bevilaqua to betray Dwight. In court, Dwight brilliantly represents himself, using his past intimate relationship with Stacy to convince the jury that the million-dollar flash drive was a personal gift rather than a bribe. Bill Bevilaqua and his enforcer, Carl Caputo, arrive in Tulsa to demand a cut of Dwight's operations. Dwight flatly refuses, declaring that he answers to no man and controls Tulsa. Dwight is ultimately found not guilty and celebrates with friends and family. Pressured by Chickie, Goodie lures Dwight outside during his victory party under the guise of another meeting with Carl. As Carl draws his weapon, Bigfoot grabs Caputo, and Goodie stabs him to death, shocking Tyson. Dwight orders Bigfoot and Goodie to dispose of the body. That night, Dwight shares a dance and romantic night with Margaret. The next morning, Bevilaqua discovers Carl's corpse on his driveway.
13	4	"Heroes and Villains"	Joshua Marston	Terence Winter & Dave Flebotte	October 6, 2024
Bevilaqua is furious with Chickie over Carl's murder as Chickie had assured him Goodie was on board to help kill Dwight. Bodhi is upset when Dwight tells him of the attempt on his life and impending trouble with the Kansas City mob, but calms down when Tyson gives everyone a speech. Cal is furious when he discovers Ming is also growing poppies for heroin on his land in addition to the marijuana plants. Bevilaqua's wife confronts him about Carl being missing and asks if he is not coming home. Cal meets Armand at the horse farm and gives him more money and Armand tells him about the wind farm Dwight is looking at. A drunk Chickie almost admits to Vinnie that he killed his father. Goodie is spooked by an Uber Eats car that keeps driving by his apartment. Jimmy introduces Dwight to Medhat and his son and they request 20 percent of all energy generated by the solar farm as well as 20 percent of all marijuana profits in exchange for allowing the farm to be built on tribal land. After debate, Dwight learns that Cal has also made an offer, but agrees to Medhat's offer. Dwight and Mitch agree to buy Donnie's car dealership. Belvilaqua and Vinnie agree to meet to discuss how to deal with Dwight. Cal also learns from Ming that two of his Chinese workers were stealing, but Ming kills them in front of Cal and all of the Chinese workers.
14	5	"Tilting at Windmills"	David Semel	William Schmidt	October 13, 2024
Dwight and Tina take her kids to visit a private school with Dwight not being impressed. Donnie shows Mitch how to run an auto dealership with Mitch expressing possible interest in the buying the dealership from Donnie. Vincent and Nicky conclude that Chickie killed his Dad. Chickie and Bevilaqua agree to a sit down meeting with Dwight. Bodhi and Jimmy visit the wind farm to check on the progress of the turbine repairs. Margaret gives Dwight information on Thresher. Joann is curious about working at the marijuana store. Thresher sends Ming's men to destroy the wind turbine farm. But, Dwight and the crew show up and beat up the workers, keeping the damage to a minimum. Thresher calls Bevilaqua to try and convince him to work together again. Dwight and Margaret have a date.
15	6	"Navigator"	David Semel	Terence Winter	October 20, 2024
Tina wants a gun to protect herself and the kids and Dwight asks Mitch to find one for her. Armand realizes that Thresher might have ulterior motives in giving him money which is confirmed in a later meeting. Tyson helps his Dad with work when his van breaks down by driving him around to all the jobs. Thresher and Ming have a stare down over Ming's men getting beat up. Chickie gets arrested for bring a loaded gun to the airport while he and Vincent were traveling to the meet in Atlanta. Joann wins over Bodhi, Jimmy and the shop crew with her baked goods and presents some good marketing and sales ideas. Mitch gives Tina shooting lessons. Dwight, Goodie, Bevilaqua and Vincent meet in a soul food restaurant in Atlanta. Dwight and Bevilaqua come to an agreement that leaves New York out of the deal, much to Chickie's displeasure. Tyson buys his Dad an SUV, but his Dad is seriously injured when the Navigator explodes when he starts it.
16	7	"Life Support"	Kevin Dowling	Dave Flebotte	October 27, 2024
Tyson plans his vengeance after the explosion only injured his father. When Dwight shows up at the hospital, Tyson's mother slaps him and blames him for her husband's plight. After the investigation, it's clear that Dwight was the real target. Everyone at the weed store starts worrying for their own lives. Dwight confronts Armand about his relationship with Thresher. Vincent meets with members of the New York families to get their consent to remove Chickie as the head of the Invernizzi clan. Dwight tracks down a white Prius from the license plate, meets Thresher and immediately asks him about the bombing. Ming admits to Thresher that the white Prius belongs to him and destroys it. In the meantime, Tyson visits his father and ask him to forgiveness before trying to get his revenge on Bevilaqua with a gun. Dwight tries to tell him about the Prius but it's too late. When Bevilaqaua's enforcer Vic leaves the Bevilaqua house and starts shooting at Tyson's car, Tyson fires back causing Vic's car to crash.
17	8	"Under New Management"	Kevin Dowling	William Schmidt & Terence Winter	November 3, 2024
Dwight confronts Tyson about his reckless shooting but promising to not abandon him after all and protect his family. Bevilaqua declares war on Dwight after Tyson's attack on Vic and sends gunmen to strike back. Armand argues with his ex-wife Clara after admitting he is considering going to the FBI. Margaret fires a drunken Armand. Dwight forces his daughter Tina to leave with her kids because the danger that coming. Desperate for money, Armand goes to Thresher and begs for money, only to be rejected. The FBI warns Dwight that Bevilaqua is planning an attempt on his life. Thresher is forced to turn his weed business over to Ming for only $1,000. With the consent of the other New York mob families, Vince takes control of their family from Chickie. Bevilaqua's men attack Jimmy the Creek and Bodhi outside the weed store, killing Jimmy. Thresher goes to Bevilaqua seeking his help with Ming. Armand confronts Goodie and threatens him with a gun and steals Dwight's cash.
18	9	"Triad"	Craig Zisk	Joseph Riccobene	November 10, 2024
After Jimmy's death, the Native American tribe holds a funeral, with Old Smoke delivering a eulogy. MedHat and his son gift Dwight a tomahawk from Jimmy's mother, pledging support in the brewing conflict. On the ride home, Bodhi asks Dwight about taking out Bevilaqua, but Dwight brushes it off. Goodie later reveals Armand stole $500,000 from Dwight, prompting plans to eliminate Bevilaqua. Chickie is told to negotiate Dwight's return to New York but is blocked from flying. Bevilaqua urges his crew to lie low and plans to handle Thresher. Thresher meets with Bevilaqua, then warns Margaret that Ming now controls his business and that Ming is a threat to her. Tyson's Dad tries to mediate peace between him and his mother. Margaret urges Dwight to mediate and reveals she sold 49% of her ranch to Thresher and that it is Ming who is behind the recent attack against Tyson's father, not Bevilaqua. Dwight agrees to a sit-down. At the meeting, Thresher blames Ming for the assassination attempt. Dwight agrees to think about working with Bevilaqua and Thresher against Ming. Armand, secretly working with Dwight, tips off Ming about Dwight's location. At Margaret's ranch, Dwight's allies, including the tribe and Bevilaqua's men, ambush and kill Ming's men and injure Ming. Tyson then kills Ming in revenge for the attack on his father. In a flashback, Armand returns Dwight's money. Joann stops Dwight from killing him and Armand agrees to lure Ming. Chickie travels to Tulsa on a train. Dwight informs Margaret that her ranch is safe and his mission is complete.
19	10	"Reconstruction"	Craig Zisk	Terence Winter & Sylvester Stallone	November 17, 2024
Dwight, Bodhi, Tyson, and Bigfoot successfully force Cal Thresher to hand over his 18,200-acre weed farm as a favour for saving his life and killing Ming. After insulting Bigfoot, Dwight respects and spares Thresher so he can return to his oil empire. Meanwhile, Mitch buys out Donnie's car dealership; Donnie jokes about using his money to start a rival dealership. In New York, leadership shifts as Chickie is removed as boss and Vince takes charge of the Invernizzi family. Meeting Dwight at his weed store, Dwight firmly rejects the offer. Margaret forgives Armand after he apologises. Concurrently, Bill Bevilaqua demands a larger 50% cut of the operation for his help against Ming, but Dwight offers 25% due to Jimmy's murder, angering Bevilaqua. Chickie and Bill meet to plot against Dwight. At a final meeting with Dwight at the Bred2Buck, Bill unexpectedly shoots Chickie in the head, killing him. Dwight rewards Bill with the requested 50% stake in the weed business in exchange for eliminating his rival. Dwight and the crew celebrate the grand success of Mitch's eccentric new commercial, and he enjoys the peace until masked gunmen suddenly raid Margaret's home, abducting him into captivity.

=== Season 3 (2025) ===
No. overall	No. in season	Title	Directed by	Written by	Original release date
20	1	"Blood and Bourbon"	Jim McKay	Dave Erickson and Sylvester Stallone	September 21, 2025
Dwight finds himself abducted by FBI Agent Musso, who discloses that Ripple, the man Dwight killed and for whom he was imprisoned, was an informant. Musso claims he has incriminating evidence against the entire Tulsa operation but allows Dwight to leave under the condition that he answers to Musso. In New York, Dwight meets mafia kingpin Ray Renzetti, who offers him a senior role in his organisation; Dwight declines to cut him in on the operation, prompting threats against his Tulsa operations. Concerned for Margaret's safety, Dwight tries to distance himself from her. Meanwhile, Mitch encounters Cleo Montague, his ex-girlfriend, at his car dealership, who shares that her father's bourbon distillery is facing threats from rival Jeremiah Dunmire and wishes to sell. Dwight shows interest, but Theodore Montague rejects his offer, as he has a prior deal with Dunmire. Meanwhile, Bodhi, Grace, and Tyson undertake a cash drop to Bevilaqua's crew using Bodhi's electric car, but the bag contains books rather than cash. This leads Bodhi to confront a crew member at gunpoint, revealing him as Jimmy's killer. Cole Dunmire informs Jeremiah that Theodore has accepted Dwight's offer. That night, Dunmire's crew kills Theodore and burns his house.
21	2	"The Fifty"	Jim McKay	Sheri Elwood	September 28, 2025
Dwight and Margaret attend Theodore's funeral, where tensions with the Dunmires escalate. Despite Jeremiah's offer of three times Montague's purchase price, Dwight refuses. Cleo informs Dwight of a hidden $150 million bourbon stash. Tyson asks his father for help restoring the distillery's bottling system; Mark initially refuses, but Tyson’s mother persuades him to assist. Dwight, Bigfoot, and Mitch approach Walden Eustice, a distributor intimidated into dropping Montague by the Dunmires, who ultimately agrees to help. Cole Dunmire attempts to reconcile with Cleo, but resorts to threats upon her rejection. Bevilaqua demands a share of Dwight's distillery's operation. Meanwhile, Mark begins work at the distillery, and Bodhi expresses his intent to cyber-spy Jimmy's murderer. After Cole informs his father about Dwight's meeting with Eustice, Jeremiah's crew beat up Eustice. Mark successfully revitalizes the bottling operation; Dwight leads a celebratory toast to the Montague 50, though he confides to Tyson that he accepted the role due to maternal pressure. Dwight reminds Thresher, who is running for governor, of an outstanding favor. Meanwhile, Cole's crew assaults Mitch, but he fends them off with Cleo's help. Jeremiah threatens Dwight, promising to ruin him, to which Dwight retaliates with a counter-threat.
22	3	"The G and the OG"	Kevin Dowling	Jameel Saleem	October 5, 2025
Musso instructs Dwight to go to an address for a pickup, which turns out to be a driverless car that takes him to meet Musso for a sting operation against suspected terrorist Dexter Deacon in Texas. During their journey, Dwight cleverly talks a local police officer out of issuing a speeding ticket. Dwight visits Dexter's shop, revealing his true identity to lay the groundwork for future business deals. Armand's concerned wife, Clara, confronts Joanne at the distillery regarding her missing husband, but Joanne denies knowing anything. Cleo and Mitch embark on a road trip, during which Cleo unexpectedly detours to vandalise Dunmire's lawn, and they evade an encounter with Dunmire's men. Meanwhile, Bodhi, Tyson, Grace, and Goodie track Cole to a bingo hall running a crooked operation. They join a table, win the jackpot, and force a reluctant Cole to pay out before celebrating their winnings at a strip club. Later, Cole ambushes Tyson and Serenity in a private room, kidnapping Tyson and beating him up to disclose the location of the prized 50-year-old bourbon. Meanwhile, Mitch reprimands Cleo for her behaviour. Following Cole's raid on the bourbon stash, a furious Dwight discovers the theft and plans Dunmire's elimination.
23	4	"Staring Down the Barrel"	Kevin Dowling	Taylor Streitz	October 12, 2025
Dwight meets the team and develops next steps to deal with Cole's theft of the 50-year-old bourbon. Tyson knows he has to be the one to fix it. Bevilaqua arrives with the news of the stolen fifty. He ends up killing their first lead, the truck driver who helped move the stolen goods, without getting any information. Meanwhile, Vince alerts Ray to Dwight's bourbon operation in Tulsa. Margaret and Thresher meet, and she assesses his political prospects negatively, but agrees to help him win the governor election if he agrees to sell his share of her ranch back at a steep discount. Bodhi and Grace develop an online marketing strategy based on an AI-generated fake person. Agent Musso tries to deter Dwight from a war with Dunmire. Tyson and Mark uncover Serenity's involvement in the theft conspiracy, which Tyson reports to Dwight. They track her to Cole's hideout containing stolen bourbon, where Dwight and his crew meet them. They take Cole hostage and negotiate a swap, which Dunmire eventually accepts, allowing Dwight's team to depart with the recovered bourbon. Meanwhile, Bevilaqua receives a call from Ray, who offers to help him with potential future difficulties.
24	5	"On the Rocks"	Joe Chappelle	Ildy Modrovich and Sylvester Stallone	October 19, 2025
Dunmire meets privately with the attorney general, A.G. Sackrider, and organises secret interference on Dwight and Bevilaqua's operations. Dexter Deacon pressures Dwight for an immediate meeting at Bred2Buck. Despite initial refusal, Musso compels Dwight to attend. During the meeting, Dwight identifies Dunmire's house as a bombing target, with Deacon demanding $250,000 for the act up front and another $250,000 after it is done. Bodhi and Grace's distillery opening night, featuring the Montague 50, has drawn critics and industry insiders, including Margaret and Thresher, who are leveraging the event in their election strategy. Leery, a corrupt safety inspector, arrives to shut down operations due to Dunmire's influence. During the inspection, Bigfoot dislodges a barrel, killing Leery brutally. Soon, Dunmire, his crew and the police interrupt the event. Dunmire accuses Dwight of theft, while Cole destroys a barrel, shocking Spencer. This leads to the crowd dispersing, resulting in a PR disaster for the launch party. Goodie, Bigfoot, and Mitch reveal Leery’s body to Dwight and plan to stage it as an accident. Bevilaqua questions Dwight at home regarding his meeting with Dexter (whose identity he does not know), doubting Dwight's loyalty. Subsequently, an armed response unit arrests Bevilaqua.
25	6	"Bubbles"	Joe Chappelle	Joseph Riccobene	October 26, 2025
Dwight discusses Bevilaqua's concerns and reveals to Joanne that the FBI is using the crew's illegal activities as leverage to force him to take down a dangerous target, Dexter Deacon. Meanwhile, after Bodhi is persuaded to report Leery's death as accidental, the police remove Leery's body and close the distillery at Dunmire's influence, prompting Dwight to shift the remaining bourbon into private distribution channels; Goodie informs Dwight of Bevilaqua's disappearance. Cleo and Mitch break into the distillery to steal bourbon crates for private sale. While Tyson, Bigfoot, and Dwight travel to Arkansas for a high-stakes summit with Ray Renzetti, Bigfoot easily fights off Cole's thugs pursuing them at a gas station. Simultaneously, a corrupt cop on Dunmire's payroll attempts to arrest Cleo and Mitch for transporting the illicit bourbon, but they overpower him and successfully deliver the goods. During the meeting, Renzetti aggressively demands an 80% cut of the bourbon operation and denies involvement in Bevilaqua's disappearance. Suddenly, Cole Dunmire's hit squad ambushes them. Thanks to Bigfoot's quick intervention, the group survives the shootout, though Renzetti remains deeply shaken and suspicious. Goodie calls Dwight with devastating news: police found Armand dead after he hanged himself in a flophouse.
26	7	"Art of War"	Guy Ferland	Daniel C. Connolly	November 2, 2025
Ray Renzetti calls Dwight to smooth over tensions, explains that the recent hit was meant for him, and proposes partnering to expand distribution into the Northeast. After the call, Dwight realises that Ray is going to kill him. Meanwhile, Dwight meets with Sackrider to discuss restoration of Joanne's liquor license and his loyalty to Dunmire. Later, Margaret orchestrates a plan. Margaret befriends Sackrider's wife and discovers Sackrider's severe gambling addiction. They meet with Thresher and persuade him to seek Sackrider's support for his political campaign. Goodie, Tyson and Spencer successfully execute a drug theft from a frat house, posing as corrupt police officers, stealing ecstasy pills and money. Dwight and his allies lure Sackrider into gambling at the Bred2Buck by offering him complimentary casino chips on the house. Assisted by Grace and the house, Sackrider quickly racks up a massive $100,000 debt. Dwight then waives the debt in exchange for a crucial political favor: the restoration of Joanne's liquor license. When Thresher realises Dwight and Margaret played him to help secure Sackrider's influence for his own campaign, he becomes furious. Concurrently, a rage-filled Jeremiah Dunmire storms into Sackrider's office and violently assaults him, leading to the police arresting Dunmire.
27	8	"Nothing Is Over"	Guy Ferland	Nick Jones Jr. & Sylvester Stallone	November 9, 2025
The distillery opens again following Sackrider's licence decision. Dunmire is released on bail. Deacon completes the bomb for Dwight but then meets Dunmire and informs on Dwight's plan. Deacon states he intends to kill Dwight instead, since he was suspicious of him from the start, but will also harm his inner circle as his gift to Dunmire. Deacon attempts to set up a meeting with Dwight, who refuses and insists on deciding the time and place. Dwight and Musso meet beforehand, where Dwight demands Bevilaqua be released, which Musso refuses. Deacon attempts to betray Dwight at the meeting, but Dwight, Bigfoot and Mitch capture him and torture him. Tyson and Spencer need Bodhi's help to put on an event to sell the confiscated drugs, and he agrees for a cut. At the event, Cole turns up and reveals to Spencer Deacon's intention to betray Dwight. Spencer informs Tyson, and Tyson realises that Margaret is in danger and informs Dwight. He realises that the bomb is at the Grand Hotel where Thresher's campaign launch event is being held. They hide Deacon's body in the Montague crypt, alert Musso and together they manage to evacuate the hotel just before the explosion.
28	9	"Dead Weight"	Jim McKay	Story by : Dave Erickson & Daniel C. Connolly & Ildy Modrovich; Teleplay by : Daniel C. Connolly & Ildy Modrovich	November 16, 2025
Hitman Russell Washington is seen carrying out a hit at a hotel in New Jersey, before then meeting with Ray Renzetti, who pays him twice and persuades him to assassinate Dwight, against Russell's objections. He later visits the Bred2Buck, where he meets Dwight and informs him that Ray paid him to kill Dwight. Later, Ray calls Russell to see what's happening. Russell tells him he won't carry out the hit, which infuriates Ray. Russell later meets Dwight at home, who informs him he knows Ray now has hits planned for both of them. They later discover the motel where the assassins are staying and kill them. Tyson asks Bodhi for help securing a reliable supply of ecstasy, who agrees to manufacture it himself rather than help find a third-party supplier. After Santiago, a bar owner, catches Spencer and Tyson selling pills, he instructs his security to get them out. Dwight offers to hand over to Musso all the intel extracted from Deacon in exchange for a federal liquor licence. This coincides with Dunmire losing a series of distribution deals, which infuriates Dunmire. Dunmire responds by having one of his men kidnap Joanne at the distillery.
29	10	"Jesus Lizard"	Jim McKay	Dave Erickson & Sylvester Stallone	November 23, 2025
Dwight discovers that Jeremiah Dunmire has kidnapped his sister, Joanne, holding her captive at his estate in exchange for Dwight's distillery. Following Dexter's terrorist attack, Cal Thresher's election prospects surge, leading to a victorious campaign and a proposition for Margaret to join his upcoming administration. Determined to save her, Dwight mobilizes his crew for war, securing extra weapons and gaining reinforcements from Bigfoot's cousins alongside support from Lee. Spencer arrives and brings Jeremiah's son, Cole, shocking everyone. Disillusioned by his father's actions and after comforting Joanne, Cole defects to Dwight's side and provides him with a detailed blueprint of the compound to aid their assault. Armed with Cole's intel, Dwight's crew launches a 3:00 a.m. raid on the estate. Using grenade launchers, smoke launchers, and heavy firepower, they violently eliminate Jeremiah's guards. After Mitch escorts the rescued Joanne to safety, Dwight pursues a fleeing Jeremiah. In retribution for Montague's death, Dwight brutally beats Jeremiah and leaves him to burn alive. When the crew are celebrating, Musso meets Dwight to deliver the long-awaited federal TTB alcohol license, officially securing the crew's legal business future in exchange for resolving the Deacon situation, and reassures Musso that Deacon's body will never be found.

=== Season 4 (2026) ===
No. overall	No. in season	Title	Directed by	Written by	Original release date
30	1	"W.W.D.D."	Guy Ferland	Terence Winter	October 16, 2026
Dwight rebrands his crew as "Friedman Enterprises" and celebrates Montague Distillery's nationwide distribution and increased profits for Bred-2Buck and Even Higher Plane, while Mitch's dealership goes into bankruptcy. Emphasizing lawfulness, Dwight receives ecstasy profits from Tyson. Dwight successfully negotiates a 25% distribution deal with Quiet Ray, but mutual distrust creates tension; Bevilaqua warns Dwight about Ray. Tyson and Spencer try to persuade Bodhi to make ecstasy, but he refuses, fearing Dwight. Meanwhile, Dwight dines with Margaret; Spencer and Tyson do ecstasy dealing, clashing with Santiago, a rival dealer. At a New York summit, Quiet Ray demonstrates his power by taking over the Invernizzi family and presents the Buffalo mob boss' severed head, shocking everyone. Subsequently, Tyson, Spencer, and Goodie execute a drug robbery against Santiago, injuring him. Mitch orchestrates an insurance fraud scheme involving junk cars, bribing Paul for blank registrations for a £150,000 Range Rover. Cal returns Fennario Ranch to Margaret, and they attend a conference in the Mariana Islands. Bodhi gets suspicious of expensive wine from Timpone. English Dan, a ruthless drug lord, visits Santiago in hospital, seeking revenge for the stolen drugs. At night, Joanne informs Dwight that the plane carrying Margaret and Thresher has crashed in the Pacific Ocean.
31	2	"Blind Rooster"	Guy Ferland	Bradley Paul & Terence Winter	October 23, 2026
In the aftermath of a tragic plane crash that killed Governor Cal Thresher and Margaret, Lieutenant Governor Amanda Clark steps into power. Quiet Ray and Musso express condolences to Dwight, and Musso discusses the ongoing investigation into the crash. Meanwhile, Bradley Van Heusen pressures Clark to fast-track permits for his AI company, Echelon Harvest, leveraging past campaign contributions. Clark agrees under the condition of strict compliance with regulations. Vince arrives at the Bred-2-Buck, as Quiet Ray's emissary to oversee the bourbon business. Amanda orders Sackrider to revoke Dwight's liquor license, associating Dwight with mafia corruption. Vince and Goodie inadvertently rob a white supremacist group, Aryan Apostles. Simultaneously, Bodhi, Bigfoot, and Dwight reveal a Barolo wine scam at a restaurant. They confront Timpone, who drops his Italian facade and unveils his true identity, Lenny. Concurrently, Tyson's ecstasy venture with Grace turns dangerous after laced drugs lead to unresponsive club patrons, which leads to the police and English Dan searching for him. As Dwight grapples with grief over Margaret, Bodhi shares his own past tragedy of losing his wife and child in a car accident and encourages Dwight to confront his pain rather than hide from it. At a church, Dwight listens to Margaret's final voicemail.
32	3	"Cease & Desist"	Aron Gaudet & Gita Pullapilly	Thomas Kelly & Terence Winter	October 30, 2026
Dwight's legitimate businesses close under a coordinated shutdown by state agencies, halting his alcohol and cannabis operations and freezes a major million-dollar bourbon shipment and destroys lots of expensive bourbon barrels over alleged lead contamination. English Dan discovers from Detective Wozniak that Tyson Mitchell is the one who robbed him, prompting Dan to choke and kill Santiago when he fails to handle the situation. Dan later targets Tyson and attempts to shoot him dead, however there is a shootout and Dan leaves. At the ranch, Mitch and Spencer negotiate to acquire a valuable thoroughbred, Curule, with Dwight also taking an interest in the horse's potential. Tyson and Goodie find Dan and Tyson shoots him with a valuable World War II Luger, leaving him for dead and drops the gun at the scene. Frustrated by the bureaucratic crackdown and believing Governor Clark is behind it, Dwight confronts her publicly at a high-society fundraiser, warning her to back off. Back in New York, Ray pressures Dwight for his financial cut, ignoring the fact that their operations have been wiped out. The call ends in a heated exchange of threats between Quiet Ray and Dwight.
33	4	"Square One"	Aron Gaudet & Gita Pullapilly	Joseph Riccobene & Terence Winter	November 6, 2026
Governor Clark denies targeting Dwight Manfredi to reporters, claiming his businesses were closed for code violations. Facing financial ruin, Dwight meets with his crime family to orchestrate two major schemes: he requests Bodhi to partnering with Lenny Timpone to forge high-end wine while Spencer and Mitch planned a horse-racing scam by disguising a lightning-fast horse to rig a race. Quiet Ray calls and demands that Vince returns with the money from Dwight. Meanwhile, Dwight and Grace help Tyson create a rap song. Dwight argues with Bevilaqua over unpaid debts and leaked secrets, though the two eventually agree to invest in an underground poker club at the distillery. Amanda plans to seize Fennario Ranch by eminent domain; Mitch informs Dwight that the state and Bradley’s ranch seizure plan for his AI data farm. He instructs Goodie to dig up Ming’s buried body before state surveyors arrive, with Vince reluctantly assisting Goodie. A fake police car ambushes Dwight and Bigfoot, leaving Bigfoot wounded. Subsequently, Joanne secures a $600,000 payout at the racecourse. Tyson and Grace debut Tyson’s new song at a local venue, where it becomes an instant hit. Back home, Dwight and Joanne discuss whether Quiet Ray was behind the hit.
34	5	"Dinosaurs"	Guy Ferland	Matthew Shire	November 13, 2026
After the attempt on his life, Dwight starts a fast. Bill Bevilaqua blames Quiet Ray, and tech investor Van Heusen presses Governor Amanda Clark to reconsider her pursuit to seize Dwight's ranch by eminent domain for an AI data center. Meanwhile, Bodhi and Timpone finish forging 23 cases of Château Luneval for an auction. Wozniak, a corrupt detective, sells Dwight the Luger for $20,000 that would tie Tyson to English Dan's murder and agrees to look into the shooting, while Grace films Tyson for social media and his rap video goes viral. At the ranch, Goodie and Vince show Mitch and Spencer a dinosaur skull, which a paleontologist identifies as a rare Acrocanthosaurus worth around a million dollars; Mitch and Spencer plan a celebratory dinner. Dwight flies to New York with Goodie and Vince to meet Ray in a church, where a gunman fires at Ray and misses. At the auction, Joanne's crew plants bidders to push up the price, but Tyson, livestreaming, keeps bidding and wins the lot for $2,263,000. Ray learns that the shooter came from Buffalo as payback for Luca Fiorentino and decides to send Turco to Tulsa. Back home, Dwight asks Joanne for minestrone.
35	6	"Racket Club"	Guy Ferland	Michael Notarile	November 20, 2026
36	7	TBA	TBA	Andrea Ciannavei	November 27, 2026
37	8	TBA	TBA	Thomas Kelly	December 4, 2026
38	9	TBA	TBA	Bradley Paul	December 11, 2026
39	10	TBA	TBA	Joseph Riccobene & Terence Winter	December 18, 2026

== Production ==
=== Development ===
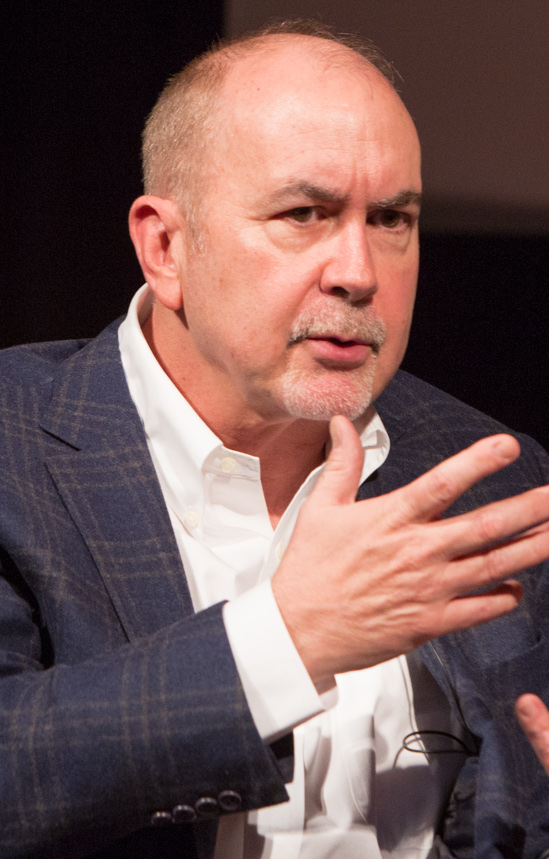
Terence Winter, the showrunner, was fired and later re-hired by creator Taylor Sheridan ahead of the second season. He left of his own accord before season three, but eventually returned for season four.

On December 6, 2021, it was reported Taylor Sheridan and Terence Winter were developing a series titled Kansas City for the digital streaming platform Paramount+. The series was created by Sheridan, who had signed a multi-year contract with ViacomCBS to create new series during the COVID-19 pandemic. The series would be centered around Sal, an Italian-American mobster from New York City who is tasked with returning the mafia to Kansas City, Missouri. Sheridan, Winter and series-star Sylvester Stallone were announced as executive producers alongside Braden Aftergood from Stallone's banner Balboa Productions which was served as co-producer for the series along with Sheridan's company Bosque Ranch Productions; and David C. Glasser, Ron Burkle and Bob Yari from the production company 101 Studios who would also be serveed as co-producer. Winter was also the series' showrunner, as MTV Entertainment Studios will be producing the upcoming television series as producer.

Sheridan wrote the pilot episode in a week. Winter moved the show's setting to Tulsa, Oklahoma, to give the characters a more-remote setting. In 2022, Deadline Hollywood stated the show was given a straight-to-series order under the title Tulsa King to reflect the change in location. Stallone involved himself in several aspects of the production. Winter noted: "With Stallone, you're getting a writer, a director, a producer, an editor"; and Glasser said Stallone was "heavily involved in the editing process".

On November 30, 2022, Tulsa King was renewed for a second season. The following February, it was announced Winter had resigned as showrunner due to "creative differences"; a new showrunner was sought but Winter would remain as an executive producer of the show. It was later revealed Sheridan had dismissed Winter because of differences in writing style; Sheridan stated he preferred character-driven plots whereas Winter preferred plot-driven characters. In February 2024, Winter was re-hired as a writer after an opening in his schedule due to delays caused by the 2023 Writers' Guild of America strike. In his modified position, Winter is the series' head writer and works outside Sheridan's direct supervision. Sheridan chose not to use a conventional showrunner for the second season and instead decided to hire a director and executive producer to oversee day-to-day production. It was announced Craig Zisk would fill this role.

In November 2024, it announced that Tulsa King was on track to secure a third and fourth season renewal. Winter once again resigned from the series in order to work on the untitled Sammy the Bull series for FX. A third season was officially confirmed in March 2025. At this time, it was reported that Dave Erickson would fill the position of a traditional showrunner, with Zisk's status unknown. By August 2025, during the production of the third season, Paramount Television Studios had taken over production of the series following the merger of MTV Entertainment Studios' parent company Paramount Global with Skydance Media into Paramount Skydance.

Ahead of the season three premiere a fourth season was ordered; it was also said that if the program continued to be successful, it could run for a total of six seasons. Erickson departed the show before season four entered production, stating that it was due to obligations on Mayor of Kingstown, another series by Sheridan, and that Winter would once again return in a head writer capacity. A later report indicated that Stallone and Erickson disagreed with each other on the creative direction of the show, and that Stallone personally requested that Winter return. As before, a showrunner was not hired with on-set oversight handled by Scott Stone, the executive in charge of production at 101 Studios, working with two unit production managers. Winter meanwhile, lead the writers' room from Los Angeles, and specifically had minimal on-set obligations worked into his contract. Crew members noted that a while studios are sometimes actively involved in production, that an executive having Stone's level of control on one of its series was unusual in the television industry. In October 2026, the series was renewed for a fifth season.

=== Casting ===
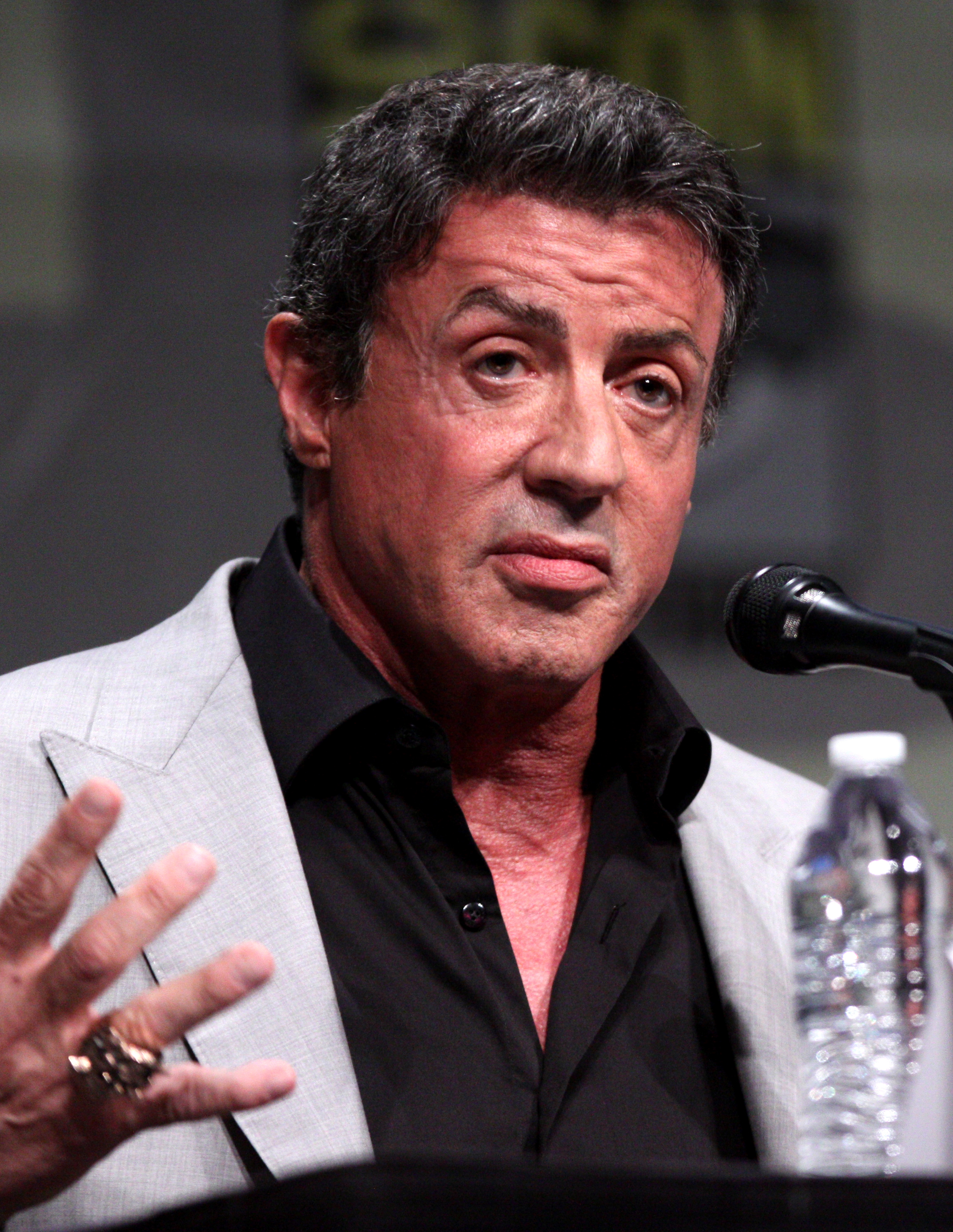
Sylvester Stallone stars in the series lead role as Dwight "The General" Manfredi.

At the time the series was announced, Sylvester Stallone was participating in negotiations to star as Tulsa King's lead character Sal in his scripted television debut. Stallone's character was later renamed Dwight "The General" Manfredi. Stallone stated filming television was more difficult and time-consuming than the films in which he had starred. On March 24, 2022, Max Casella, Domenick Lombardozzi, Vincent Piazza and Jay Will were added to the cast; Casella, Lombardozzi and Piazza portray members of the Invernizzi family crime syndicate while Will stars as a recent college graduate who becomes a member of Dwight's crew. In May, A.C. Peterson, Andrea Savage, Garrett Hedlund and Martin Starr were reported to be starring in the series; they were followed in July by Dana Delany and Annabella Sciorra in August. Miles Mussenden also stars in the series. Stallone's daughter Scarlet appears in the series as Spencer, a barista and stable hand who is recruited to work with Dwight. Scarlet was originally considered for the role of Stallone's on-screen daughter but was considered too young for the role, which instead went to Tatiana Zappardino. Additional casting for minor characters and background actors occurred in May 2022.

Before production of the second season, Sciorra and Zappardino were promoted to the main cast. Frank Grillo also joined the main cast, starring as Bill Bevilaqua, a mobster from Kansas City. On May 1, 2024, it was reported Neal McDonough would appear as Cal Thresher. Two days later, Rich Ting was cast in the recurring role of Jackie Ming. Jelly Roll, an American singer, songwriter, and rapper, made a cameo appearance as himself. He said he had been a fan of the series and is friends with Sistine, another daughter of Stallone's, who made the necessary connections. Casting for additional extras in the second season occurred in June 2024.

During filming for the second season, Stallone and an unnamed director were accused of making disparaging remarks about background extras. Stallone was allegedly heard calling certain background actors "ugly", "tub of lard" and "fat guy with a cane". Stallone also suggested the production should instead cast "pretty young girls to be around me". The Atlanta-based casting agency Rose Locke & CL Casting, which had been responsible for hiring extras, resigned from the production soon after. Zisk responded to the comments through TMZ by denying the statements were made and stating the casting agency had hired extras who were older than the requested age range. CNN reported Paramount was investigating the allegations and that no formal complaints had been filed. The actors' labor union SAG-AFTRA also responded to the allegations, saying its scope does not include background actors in Atlanta but that it would provide any requested guidance; it also issued a statement condemning such comments toward any actor. Thomas Mooneyham, a background actor on the series, stated he believed the comments were about him after he and another extra were replaced with younger people, one of which being Frank Cioppettini. Stallone did not respond to the allegations.

Stallone signed a contract in November 2024 to star in a third and fourth season of the program. With this, he reportedly received a raise after making $750,000 and $1,000,000 per episode in the first two seasons, respectively. Chris Caldovino, McKenna Quigley Harrington, and Mike "Cash Flo" Walden were promoted to the main cast for season three. Robert Patrick and Beau Knapp also joined the show as series regulars to portray Jerimiah and Cole Dunmire, a father-son pair with influence in the alcohol industry. Additional performers joining the program in the same capacity included Kevin Pollak as FBI Special Agent Musso and Bella Heathcote appearing as Cleo Montague. James Russo was cast in a recurring role to play "Quiet" Ray Renzetti, a New York mob boss.

By September 2025 further negotiations with Stallone were underway to extend his contract through a potential sixth season. Gretchen Mol joined cast as a new series regular for the fourth season. In May 2026, Richie Stephens was cast in undisclosed capacity and Eden Lee was cast in a recurring role for the fourth season.

=== Production design ===
The series' costume designer Suzanne McCabe based many outfits on the Gambino crime family and Franzese Crew, as well as photographs from newspaper clippings in the 1980s; she cited John Gotti as an inspiration. McCabe also stated she tried to mostly use monochromatic colors for the show's costumes, using dark colors for the New York City-filmed scenes and softer colors for scenes in Oklahoma to represent that state's red soil. Sylvester Stallone was allowed to pick many elements of his own costumes, including bolo ties, jewelry and shoes. Production designer Todd Jeffery used a mix of soundstages and on-location filming for Tulsa King. The sets for "The Higher Plane" dispensary featured in the series was created in a former Texaco gas station. Mirrors were used in a scene that was filmed in a strip club to make the space appear larger. Location manager Patrick Mignanom was tasked with finding a dilapidated structure whose owner would be content with having it blown up. Saunder Jurriaans and Danny Bensi composed Tulsa King's theme song.

=== Filming ===
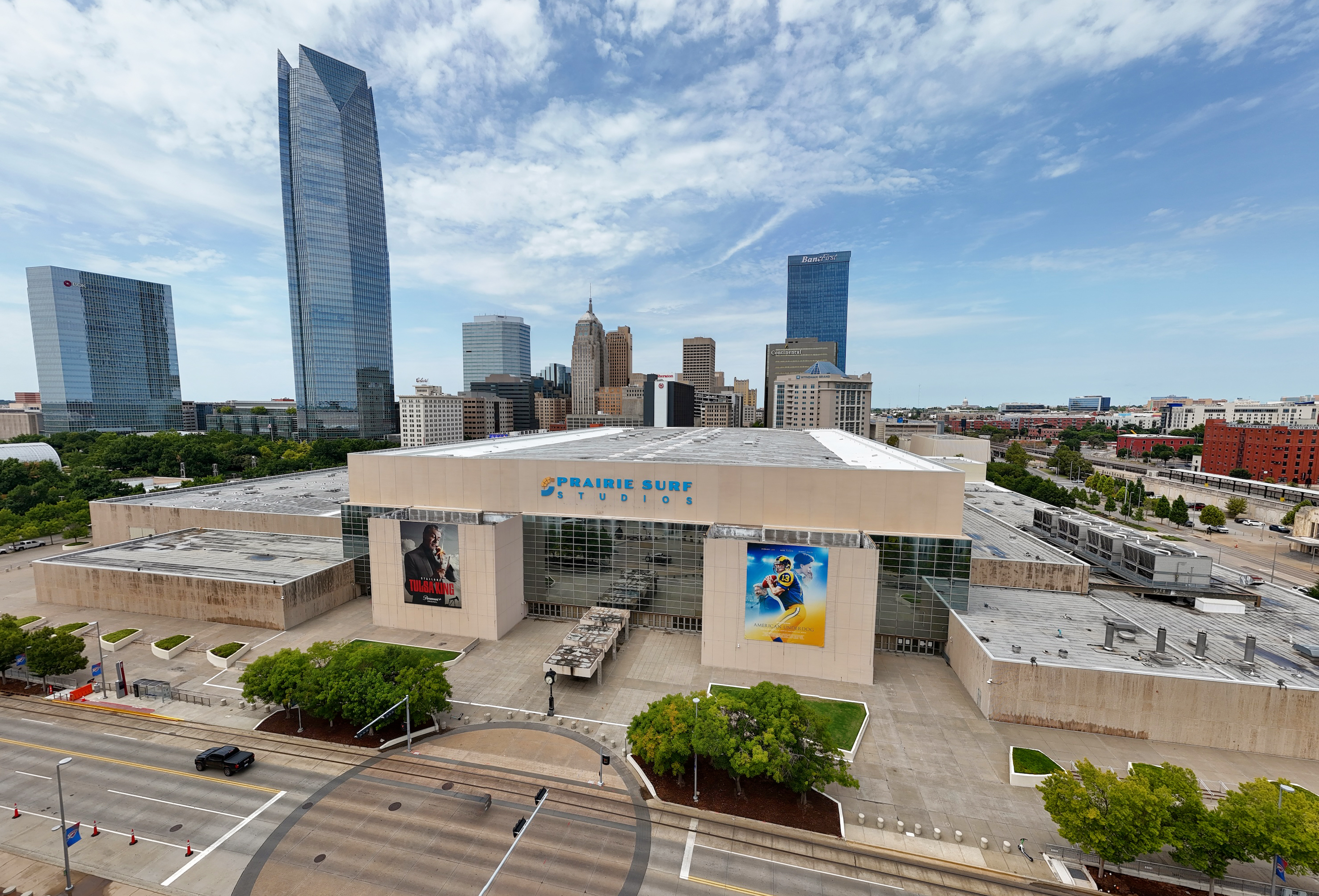
Many interior scenes for the first season were filmed at Prairie Surf Studios in Oklahoma City, which also housed production offices.

Principal photography occurred over six months in Oklahoma City, Tulsa and Bethany, concluding on August 31, 2022. Some filming occurred at Tulsa International Airport on March 29, 2022. Additional locations used in Tulsa include Center of the Universe and the Mayo Hotel. Other scenes were filmed on-location in Brooklyn, New York. The series interior scenes and production offices were housed at Prairie Surf Studios. Additional photography wrapped by October. Filming in Oklahoma boosted the state's economy by an estimated $56 million.

It was later reported the show's second season would not be filmed in Oklahoma due to costs, and complaints from the cast and crew, who did not like the extreme temperatures there. Filming on the second season occurred in the Atlanta, Georgia, suburb Norcross, using Eagle Rock Studios for sound stages. Filming began on April 1, 2024, and was scheduled to run until July 31. Some filming also took place in Gainesville, Georgia. Jelly Roll's scenes were filmed in April while he was touring for his latest studio album Beautifully Broken and was in the area. Stallone improvised lines for this scene which featured Jelly Roll performing a rendition of his song "I Am Not Okay". A second unit filmed b-roll scenes in Tulsa in mid-June 2024. Filming for the second season wrapped on August 2.

Filming for the third season began in March 2025, with production taking place in Atlanta and Oklahoma. The first episode was directed by Jim McKay. Filming wrapped on July 2, 2025.

Shortly before filming for the fourth season began, 26 crew members were abruptly fired. Among these were stunt coordinator Freddie Poole, who was also Stallone's stunt double, and had been for the fourteen years prior. He was instead offered a role as Stallone's photo double, but turned it down. Another person stated that they only found out they would not be returning when they became aware that a job listing had been posted for the position they still believed they held, and that their replacement would be paid $150 more a day than they had previously been compensated. Some of those fired had been also instructed to leave their equipment on-set after production on season three had concluded, and then were only informed of the decision a week prior just a few days before production began. Filming ultimately began on November 4, 2025.

Filming for the fifth season had begun in New York by October 2026.

== Release ==
=== Streaming ===
First season promotional poster

The series premiere episode of Tulsa King received an early promotional screening with the fifth-season premiere of Yellowstone in AMC Theatres on October 29–30, 2022. Tulsa King began its weekly release schedule on Paramount+ from November 13. The series' first two episodes were broadcast on Paramount Network on November 20 and 27, serving as a lead-out for episodes of Yellowstone. Season one concluded on January 8, 2023. In Japan, the series was launched in a Paramount+ hub on the streaming service Wowow. The first season received another linear broadcast, this time on CBS, with episodes being broadcast weekly from July 14 to September 8, 2024. Season two released weekly in the United States from September 15–November 17, 2025, with international releases beginning on September 16, while the third season began on September 21, 2025 and concluded on November 23. The fourth season premiered on October 16, 2026.

=== Home media ===
The first season received a home-media release on DVD and Blu-ray on June 6, 2023; an alternative SteelBook Blu-ray release accompanied the main release.

Television home release details for Tulsa King season 1
Tulsa King: Season One
Set details	Special features	
9 episodes; 3-disc set DVD; 2-disc set Blu-ray; English subtitles	Stranger in a Strange Land: Genesis; Carpe D.M.: Stallone; Mercy and Malice: The Cast; Haberdashery: Costume Design; Outthink Your Enemy: Stunts; The Here and Now: On Location in Tulsa; Behind the Story for every episode	
DVD release dates
Region 1	Region 2	Region 4
June 6, 2023	June 5, 2023	N/A
Blu-ray release dates
Region A		Region B
June 6, 2023		June 5, 2023

== Reception ==
=== Viewing figures ===
==== Season 1 ====
On Paramount+, Tulsa King's first season was Taylor Sheridan's fourth-most-watched series with 3.36 billion minutes viewed. In its first broadcast on Paramount Network, the series brought in 3.7 million viewers, exceeding the Game of Thrones prequel House of the Dragon as "cable's highest-rated series debut" of 2022. It is also credited with the "biggest new sign-up day in [Paramount+] history". The first season broadcast on CBS averaged 3.17 million viewers.

Viewership and ratings per episode of Tulsa King (Note: The following ratings are only for Tulsa King's first season linear broadcast on CBS and do not include viewing figures from Paramount+ or Paramount Network.)
No.	Title	Air date	Rating/share (18–49)	Total viewers (millions)
1	"Go West, Old Man"	July 14, 2024	0.18/2	3.40
2	"Center of the Universe"	July 21, 2024	0.25/4	3.46
3	"Caprice"	July 28, 2024	0.23/3	2.68
4	"Visitation Place"	August 4, 2024	0.18/2	2.75
5	"Token Joe"	August 11, 2024	0.26/4	2.97
6	"Stable"	August 18, 2024	0.25/4	3.43
7	"Warr Acres"	August 25, 2024	0.26/4	3.58
8	"Adobe Walls"	September 1, 2024	0.13/2	2.72
9	"Happy Trails"	September 8, 2024	0.27/2	3.51

==== Season 2 ====
The second-season premiere on Paramount+ was seen by two million people within 24 hours, with the number rising to 5.4 million households within its first seven days. This also set a new record on the streaming service for largest number of viewers on a series' premiere day. Social media engagements for season two also rose 943% when compared to that from the first season. Tulsa King was ranked tenth on The Wrap's "list of titles consumers are most excited about" for the week of September 22, 2024. Within 35 days of the second-season premiere, 10 million households had seen Tulsa King, beating the 9.5 million that viewed season one within the same time period by 8%. By this time, the series had eight times higher engagement and 17 times higher views than season one on social media platforms. In Nielsen data Tulsa King ranked within the top-10 streaming series during the fourth quarter of 2024.

=== Critical response ===
==== Season 1 ====
Professional ratings
Aggregate scores
Source	Rating
Metacritic	65/100
Rotten Tomatoes	79%
Review scores
Source	Rating
The A.V. Club	B−
Chicago Sun-Times	3.5 /4 stars
The Daily Telegraph	2 /5 stars
Entertainment Weekly	C+
The Guardian	3 /5 stars
IndieWire	B−
USA Today	1 /4 stars

On the review aggregator website Rotten Tomatoes, 79% of 47 critics' reviews are positive, with an average rating of 6.6/10. The website's consensus reads: "Tulsa King's stale comedy sometimes feels like ordering spaghetti with marinara and instead getting egg noodles and ketchup, but Sylvester Stallone still commands the screen with his swaggering charm." Metacritic, which uses a weighted average, assigned the film a score of 65 out of 100, based on 28 critics, indicating "generally favorable" reviews.

Darren Franich of Entertainment Weekly described the series as "Grumpy Old Grand Theft Auto". CNN Entertainment's Brian Lowery described the series as an "odd mix of attributes" but praised the series' use of time. Reviewing for The Guardian, Lucy Mangan praised the comedy aspect of the series but failed to see it innovating further. Los Angeles Times writer Robert Lloyd called the series "likeable", commending its use of comedy and character focus.

Tulsa King was often compared poorly to Winter's and Sheridan's other series; Sheridan was overseeing eight other series at the time Tulsa King debuted. The Hollywood Reporter's Daniel Fienberg wrote Sheridan's and Winter's main strength is not in comedy writing, despite the series being primarily marketed as a comedy. Fienberg goes on to state: "the first two episodes definitely give the impression of being something that Sheridan, Paramount+'s golden goose at this point, gestated between work on 15 different Yellowstone sequels and prequels". According to Anita Singh of The Daily Telegraph: "One of the writers, Terence Winter, has The Sopranos and Boardwalk Empire on his CV, but this show is to The Sopranos what Paw Patrol is to the works of David Attenborough".

Writing for the National Public Radio (NPR) talk show Fresh Air, David Bianculli compared the formula of Tulsa King to that of Yellowstone and noted the "sense of time passing and the importance of family". Stephan Lee with The Wrap said there is a "distinct straight-to-DVD quality to Tulsa King" but suggests the series stands on its own and is only poor when compared to Sheridan's and Winter's other works. Ben Travers of IndieWire described Tulsa King as "less serious" and a "breath of fresh air" compared to the seriousness and consequences in Sheridan's other series.

Stallone's acting received the highest praise from critics, although some criticized it for its lack of originality. Reviewing the first two episodes for Variety, Joshua Alston credited most of the series' success to Stallone, stating: "Tulsa King isn't a great show with him, but it would be far less interesting without him". Richard Roeper, writing for the Chicago Sun-Times, said the series was written to Stallone's strengths. The A.V. Club's Todd Lazarski also praised Stallone's acting but described the series as an "undercooked fish-out-of-water mob story". USA Today writer Kelly Lawler criticized both the overall concept and Stallone saying he is "probably the king of something, but it's certainly not Tulsa, Oklahoma", and called the show "bad Goodfellas fan fiction".

==== Season 2 ====
Professional ratings
Aggregate scores
Source	Rating
Rotten Tomatoes	100%
Review scores
Source	Rating
Collider	7/10
EscribiendoCine	6/10

On the review aggregator website Rotten Tomatoes, 100% of 5 critics' reviews are positive, with an average rating of 6.8/10. Jeff Ewing with Collider wrote that the second season "introduced new threats, but struggles to find its tone", feeling that it started off with too many filler episodes before building exposition in the later episodes.

Decider's Joel Keller stated that Tulsa King "has become less of a fish out of water story and more of a story about just what kind of absurd scheme Dwight and his motley crew can pull off". He further elaborated by saying that the first episode addressed too many storylines at one time and believing that it is becoming more focused on comedy than crime. Writing for EscribiendoCine, Emiliano Basile praised Stallone's acting, writing that he "gives his character the characteristic charisma and powerful phrases that have accompanied him since Rocky." Basile also applauded the series costume design, and highlighted Sheridan's views on cultural views in the United States.

The Quapaw Nation issued a statement during the broadcast of Tulsa King's second season, criticizing its portrayal of fictional tribal leaders in criminal conspiracies. They stated that production members did not give the tribe the chance to review the potential use of a fictionalized portrayal of themselves and that it "constituted cultural appropriation". In a follow-up statement, they later declared that a "positive resolution" had been reached with Paramount.

=== Awards and nominations ===
Year	Award	Category	Nominee(s)	Result	Ref(s).
2023	Critics' Choice Super Awards (3rd)	Best Action Series, Limited Series or Made-for-TV Movie	Tulsa King	Nominated	
2023	Critics' Choice Super Awards (3rd)	Best Actor in an Action Series, Limited Series or Made-for-TV Movie	Sylvester Stallone	Nominated	
2023	Primetime Creative Arts Emmy Awards (75th)	Outstanding Stunt Coordination for a Comedy Series or a Variety Program	Freddie Poole	Nominated	
2024	Astra Television Awards (3rd)	Best Streaming Comedy Series	Tulsa King	Nominated	
2024	Astra Television Awards (3rd)	Best Actor in a Streaming Comedy Series	Sylvester Stallone	Nominated	
2025	Saturn Awards (52nd)	Best Action-Thriller Television Series	Tulsa King	Nominated	
2025	Primetime Creative Arts Emmy Awards (77th)	Outstanding Stunt Coordination for a Comedy Series or a Variety Program	Freddie Poole	Nominated	
2026	Black Reel TV Awards (26th)	Outstanding Guest Performance in a Comedy Series	Samuel L. Jackson	Nominated	
2026	Primetime Creative Arts Emmy Awards (78th)	Outstanding Stunt Coordination for a Comedy Series or a Variety Program	Freddie Poole	Nominated	

== Spin-off ==
Winter confirmed in September 2024 that a spin-off series set in New Orleans was in the early stages of development. The series was ordered under the title NOLA King on June 5, 2025, with Samuel L. Jackson taking on the lead role of Russell Lee Washington, Jr., a character similar to Stallone's. He will executive produce the project alongside Glasser and Erickson, the latter of who will also write and showrun the series. Like Tulsa King, it will be produced by 101 Studios and MTV Entertainment Studios Jackson's character is set to be introduced during a multi-episode third season story arc; the program will then begin filming in February, with Erickson departing from Tulsa King to work on the spin-off instead. However, Erickson's remaining obligations to Tulsa King and Mayor of Kingstown, another series of Sheridan's, forced him to step down as showrunner of the spin-off after writing the pilot episode in July. At that time it was reported that the search for a replacement was underway. On February 24, 2026, it was announced that the series had undergone a creative overhaul after Erickson's departure and would be retitled to Frisco King, with the setting now being in Frisco, Texas, and that Taylor Sheridan would now write all eight episodes of the first season. Filming began in April 2026 in Fort Worth, Texas.
