= Josh Mond =

American film director

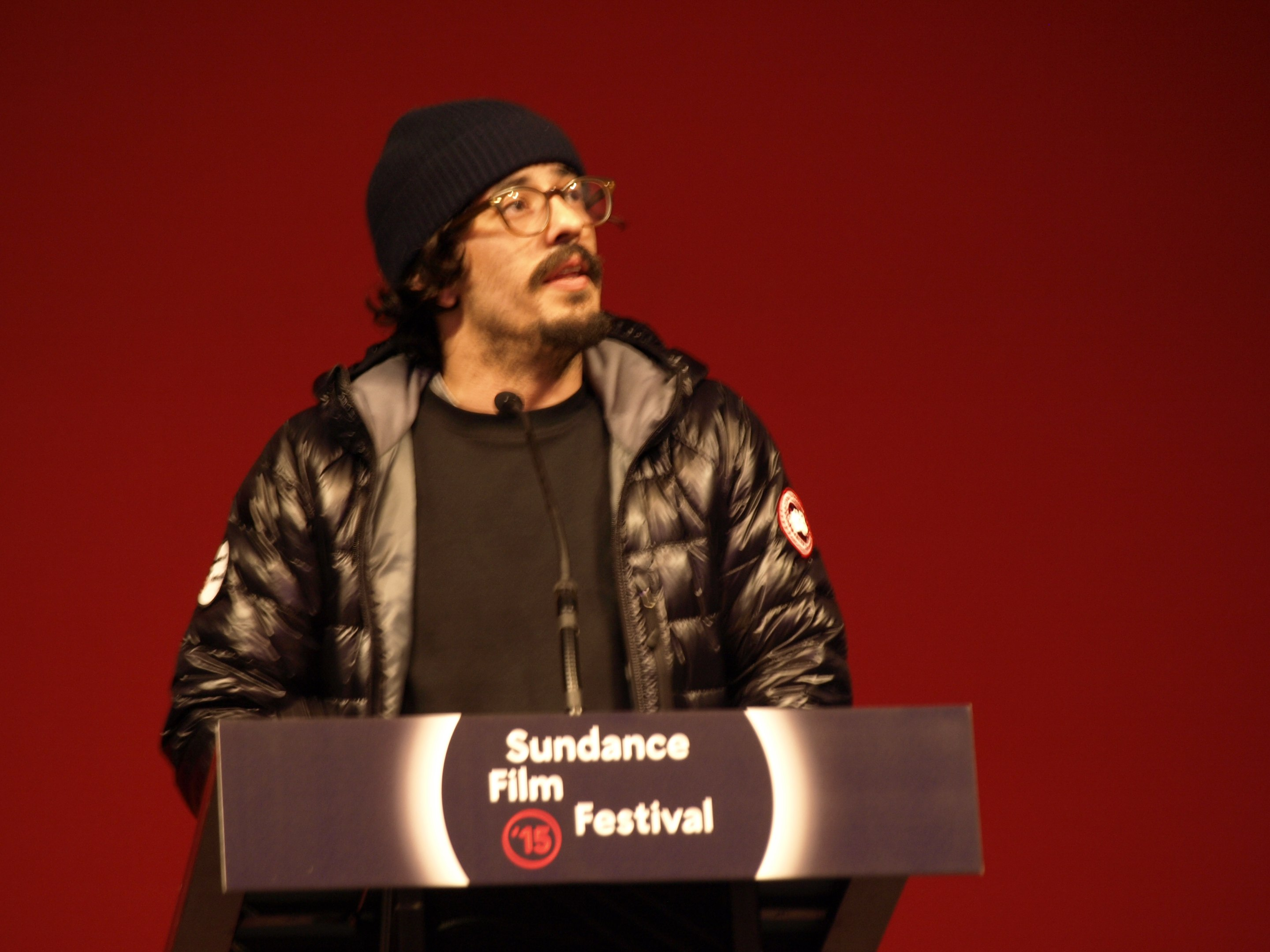
- Mond at the Sundance Film Festival in 2015
- Born: (c.) 1983 (age 42–43); New York City, New York, U.S.
- Education: Tisch School of the Arts
- Occupations: Film director, screenwriter, film producer
- Years active: 2006–present
- Relatives: Julie Mond (sister)

Josh Mond (born c. 1983) is an American film director, screenwriter and producer. He is known for producing the feature films Martha Marcy May Marlene (2011) and Simon Killer (2012), and for writing and directing James White (2015).

== Career ==
In 2003, Mond and his longtime friends and fellow Tisch School of the Arts alums Antonio Campos and Sean Durkin formed the production company Borderline Films. The trio of filmmakers rotated the roles of writer, director and producer and helped each other during the making of their films. Borderline's first feature film drama Afterschool (2008), starring Ezra Miller. It was written and directed by Campos and produced by Durkin and Mond. The film premiered at the 2008 Cannes Film Festival in the program Un Certain Regard. Afterschool was released theatrically by IFC Films and was nominated for the Independent Spirit Award for Best First Feature and Breakthrough Director for Campos by the Gotham Awards.

In 2009 production began on Borderline’s second feature film, Two Gates of Sleep, written and directed by Alistair Banks Griffin and produced by Mond and Andrew Renzi. Two Gates of Sleep, which starred Brady Corbet and David Call, premiered at the 2010 Cannes Film Festival in the Director’s Fortnight selection, went on to win the 2011 New Talent Grand PIX at CPH:PIX, and was distributed in the US by Factory 25.

The third film out of Borderline was the 2011 drama thriller Martha Marcy May Marlene, starring Elizabeth Olsen. It was written and directed by Sean Durkin and produced by Campos, Mond, Chris Maybach and Patrick S. Cunningham. Martha Marcy May Marlene premiered at the 2011 Sundance Film Festival in January, with Durkin winning the festival's U.S. Directing Award for Best Drama. It also screened in the Un Certain Regard section at the 2011 Cannes Film Festival and screened at the 36th Toronto International Film Festival on September 11, 2011. The film received a limited release in the United States on October 21, 2011, by distributor Fox Searchlight Pictures. On Metacritic the film has a score of 76 out of 100 based on 39 reviews. The film received 3 Gotham Award nomination including Breakthrough Director for Durkin, and 4 nominations at the Independent Spirit Awards including Best First Feature and a Producers Award for Mond. The film also received the Los Angeles Film Critics Association’s New Generation Award, shared by Sean Durkin, Antonio Campos, Josh Mond and Elizabeth Olsen.

In 2012, Borderline Films next film, Simon Killer premiered at the 2012 Sundance Film Festival. It was the second feature film co-written and directed by Antonio Campos and produced by Mond, Durkin and Matt Palmieri. Starring and co-written by Brady Corbet, the film was nominated for the festival's Grand Jury Prize. It was distributed by IFC and received a theatrical release on 14 April 2013.

In 2015, Mond released his first feature film James White, which he acknowledged was semi-autobiographical. Starring Christopher Abbott, the film premiered at the Sundance Film Festival, where it won the NEXT Audience Award. James White has received two nominations from the 2015 Gotham Awards. Mond is nominated for the Bingham Ray Breakthrough Director Award and Abbott is nominated for the Best Actor Award. It has also received three nominations for the Independent Spirit Awards, including Independent Spirit Award for Best First Feature.

Mond worked for six years in collaboration with Anthony F Schepperd on the animation within his 2024 film It Doesn't Matter, starring Christopher Abbott and Jay Will, which premiered at the 2024 Cannes Film Festival.

== Filmography ==
Short film

| Year | Title | Director | Writer |
|---|---|---|---|
| 2010 | Kids in Love | Yes | Yes |
| 2013 | 1009 | Yes | Yes |

Feature film

| Year | Title | Director | Writer |
|---|---|---|---|
| 2015 | James White | Yes | Yes |
| 2024 | It Doesn't Matter | Yes | Yes |

Producer

- Doris (2006) (Short film)
- Bristol Boys (2006)
- The Last 15 (2007) (Short film)
- A Long Way Home (2008) (Short film)
- Afterschool (2008)
- Mary Last Seen (2010) (Short film)
- Two Gates of Sleep (2010)
- Martha Marcy May Marlene (2011)
- Simon Killer (2012)
- Piercing (2018)

Executive producer

- Karaoke! (2013) (Short film)
- Tzniut (2014)
- The Eyes of My Mother (2016)
- Christine (2016)
- Katie Says Goodbye (2016)
