= Christopher Abbott =

American actor (born 1986)

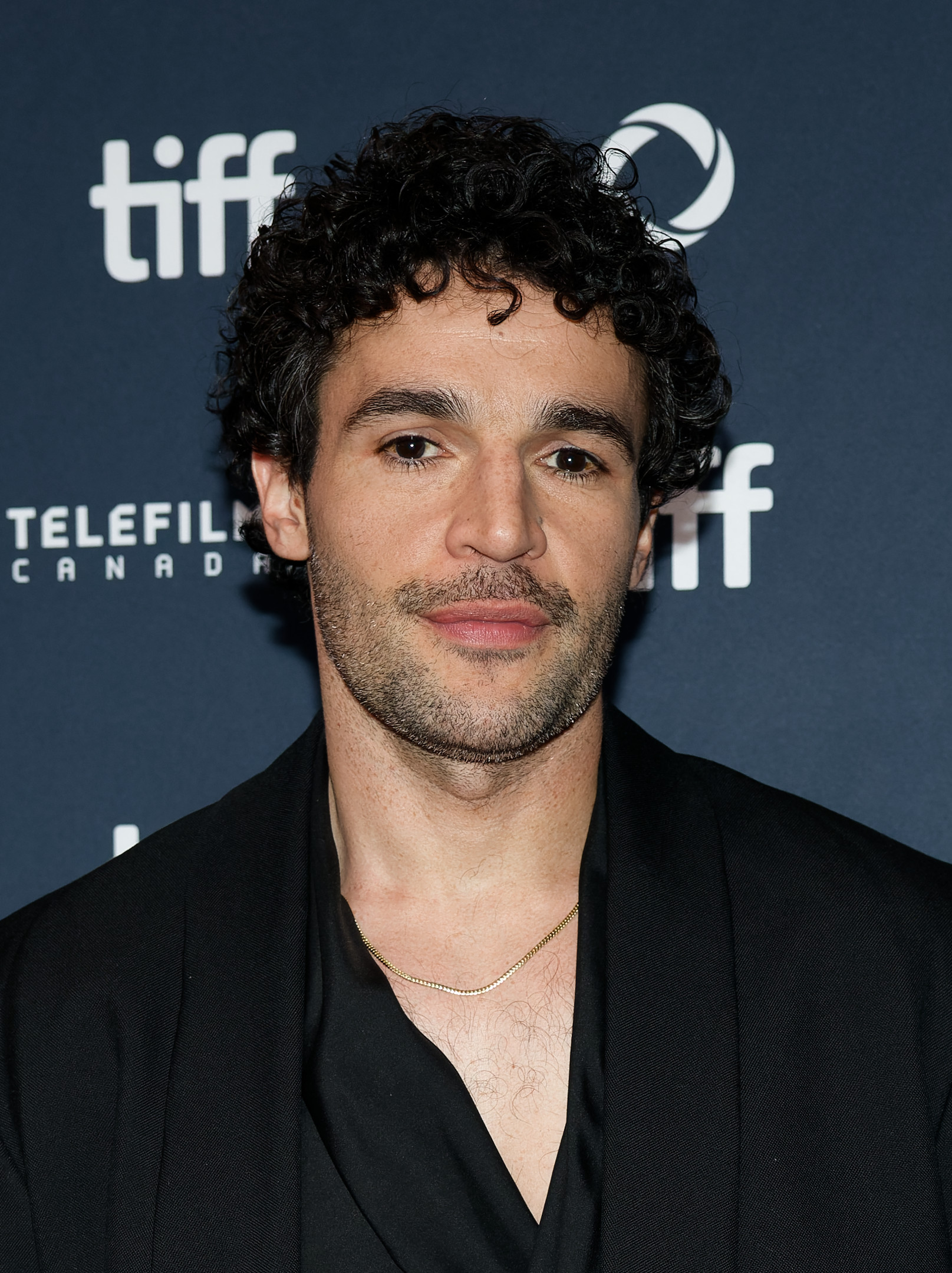
- Abbott in 2024
- Born: Christopher Jacob Abbott; February 10, 1986 (age 40); Greenwich, Connecticut, U.S.
- Education: HB Studio
- Occupation: Actor
- Years active: 2008–present
- Partner: Aubrey Plaza (2025–present)
- Children: 1

Christopher Jacob Abbott (born February 10, 1986) is an American actor. His accolades include a nomination for the Independent Spirit Award for Best Male Lead for the film James White (2015), a Golden Globe Award nomination for the Hulu miniseries Catch-22 (2019), and a nomination for the Tony Award for Best Featured Actor in a Play for portraying Biff Loman in the Broadway revival of Death of a Salesman (2026).

On television, he had his breakout in 2012 with a recurring role in the HBO series Girls. His film roles include Martha Marcy May Marlene (2011), Hello I Must Be Going (2012), Sweet Virginia (2017), First Man (2018), Black Bear (2020), Possessor (2020), On the Count of Three (2021), Sanctuary (2022), Poor Things (2023), Wolf Man (2025), The Testament of Ann Lee (2025), and You Can See Everything (2026). In 2026, he starred in the Netflix miniseries adaptation of East of Eden.

== Early life and education ==
Christopher Jacob Abbott was born on February 10, 1986, in Greenwich, Connecticut. His mother is Anna (née Servidio) and his father is Orville Abbott. He has an older sister, Christina.

Abbott's father was born in Saint Vincent and the Grenadines in the Caribbean. His mother is of Italian descent. His maternal grandmother, Angelina, was born in Rosà, a town in the province of Vicenza in Italy. He also has distant Portuguese and Eastern European ancestry. In his early years he lived in Chickahominy, a working-class, heavily Italian American neighborhood in Greenwich, and grew up in Stamford.

In Connecticut, Abbott worked at a local video store and at his friend's wine store. He attended Norwalk Community College in Norwalk, Connecticut, where he took his first acting class. He then began studying acting at HB Studio in Greenwich Village in Manhattan, New York City. He moved to New York City in 2006 to be closer to school and pursue acting.

== Career ==
=== 2008–2012: Early career ===
Abbott began going to large open calls for plays while in school, which is how he got his two first acting jobs off-Broadway. The first play, Good Boys and True, opened in the spring of 2008 and was written by Roberto Aguirre-Sacasa and directed by Scott Ellis. It followed a scandal at a prep school. Abbott played the lead character's (Brian J. Smith) gay best friend, Justin. The second play, Mouth to Mouth, opened in the fall of 2008. The play depicted the limits of friendship and family, and was written by Kevin Elyot and directed by Mark Brokaw. Abbott played the sympathetic 15-year-old son of Laura (Lisa Emery). Abbott received positive reviews for both productions. Guest-starring roles in the comedy series Nurse Jackie and the police procedural series Law & Order: Criminal Intent followed. In 2010, Abbott co-starred opposite Cristin Milioti and Laila Robins in the play That Face at the Manhattan Theatre Club.

Abbott made his feature film debut in the 2011 drama thriller Martha Marcy May Marlene opposite Elizabeth Olsen. Written and directed by Sean Durkin, the film premiered at the 2011 Sundance Film Festival in January, and had a limited release in the United States on October 21, 2011. It was met with positive reviews. The same year, Abbott made his Broadway debut in the revival of the play The House of Blue Leaves opposite Ben Stiller and Edie Falco. Directed by David Cromer, the play opened in April 2011. Abbott played the part of the sullen, recently drafted son, Ronnie Shaughnessy, for which Abbott received positive reviews.

=== 2012–2018: Girls and film roles ===
In 2012, Abbott co-starred opposite Melanie Lynskey in the comedy-drama film Hello I Must Be Going. The film premiered at the 2012 Sundance Film Festival, and was released theatrically in the United States on September 7, 2012. Critic Roger Ebert praised the film and Abbott's performance. Abbott gained public recognition for his role as the docile boyfriend of Marnie (Allison Williams), Charlie Dattolo in the HBO comedy-drama series Girls. Created by Lena Dunham, the series premiered on April 15, 2012. Abbott quit the series after the show’s season-two finale, stating that the reason why he left was because he could not relate to the character. He returned to the series for the season 5 episode "The Panic in Central Park". Before leaving Girls in 2013, Abbott starred in a series of short films opposite model-actress Sheila Márquez for Free People and guest-starred in an episode of the comedy-drama series Enlightened opposite Luke Wilson.

After leaving the series, Abbott returned to the theatre in the fall of 2013 in the play Where We're Born by Lucy Thurber at the Rattlestick Playwrights Theater. The Jackson Gay-directed play featured Abbott opposite a cast that included Betty Gilpin. Abbott received positive reviews for his role as Tony. In 2014, Abbott co-starred in the drama film The Sleepwalker, co-written by his good friend Brady Corbet. It premiered in-competition in the US Dramatic Category at 2014 Sundance Film Festival on January 20, 2014. It was met with mixed to positive reviews. Abbott also co-starred opposite Sam Rockwell and Nina Arianda in the 2014 production of Sam Shepard's play Fool for Love at the Williamstown Theatre Festival. Abbott received positive reviews for his performance in the Daniel Aukin-directed play. In his second film of 2014, Abbott played the supporting role of Louis Servidio in J. C. Chandor's crime drama film A Most Violent Year. Starring Oscar Isaac and Jessica Chastain, the film had its world premiere at the AFI Fest on November 6, 2014, at the Dolby Theatre in Hollywood and received a limited release on December 31, 2014.

In the fall of 2015, Abbott played Elias Schreiber-Hoffman in the Annie Baker play John opposite Georgia Engel and Lois Smith. Directed by Sam Gold, the play took place at the Signature Theatre. Abbott's performance received positive reviews and the play was chosen as one of the best plays of 2015 by The New York Times. Abbott starred as the title character in the drama James White opposite Cynthia Nixon, directed by Josh Mond. The film premiered at the 2015 Sundance Film Festival on January 23, 2015 and received a theatrical limited release on November 13, 2015. It was met with positive reviews and Abbott received a nomination for the Independent Spirit Award for Best Male Lead.

In 2016, Abbott co-starred in the comedy war film Whiskey Tango Foxtrot, opposite Tina Fey and Martin Freeman, released on March 4, 2016. Abbott also returned for an episode of Girls, in the series' fifth season. The episode was critically acclaimed and lauded as one of the series' best episodes ever. In the summer of 2016, Abbott co-starred opposite Marisa Tomei in the Trip Cullman production of Tennessee Williams' play The Rose Tattoo at the Williamstown Theatre Festival, for which Abbott received positive reviews. Abbott co-starred opposite Olivia Cooke in the American independent drama film Katie Says Goodbye, which premiered at the 2016 Toronto International Film Festival.

Abbott starred alongside Joel Edgerton and Riley Keough in Trey Edward Shults's horror film It Comes at Night, which was released on June 9, 2017. He co-starred in Jamie M. Dagg's 2017 thriller Sweet Virginia, opposite Jon Bernthal, Imogen Poots and Rosemarie DeWitt. He also co-starred opposite Jessica Biel and Bill Pullman in the television series The Sinner, which debuted in 2017. Abbott also starred opposite Mia Wasikowska in Nicolas Pesce's film Piercing (2018), based on the novel of the same name.

In 2019, he portrayed Capt. Yossarian in the Hulu miniseries Catch-22, based on the novel of the same name, which earned him a nomination for Best Performance by an Actor in a Limited Series or Motion Picture Made for Television at the 77th Golden Globes.

=== 2020–present: Recent projects ===
In 2020, he starred in two films that premiered at the Sundance Film Festival: Black Bear, a psychological drama opposite Aubrey Plaza and Sarah Gadon, and the horror film Possessor, directed by Brandon Cronenberg. In 2021, Abbott starred in John Michael McDonagh's The Forgiven, followed by Zachary Wigon's second feature film Sanctuary in 2022 and Yorgos Lanthimos' Poor Things in 2023. In 2023, Abbott returned to TV in the role of Stan in the Apple TV+ anthology series The Crowded Room, alongside Tom Holland and Amanda Seyfried.

In March 2022, he joined Aaron Taylor-Johnson in Kraven the Hunter as the film's main villain, which was reported to be the Foreigner. Principal photography began on March 20, 2022. In May 2022, he signed to star in Justin Anderson's directorial debut Swimming Home, an adaptation of the Booker Prize-nominated novel of the same name by Deborah Levy. He has also voiced Reed, an art dealer, in the adult animated music television series Entergalactic, based on the album of the same name by American musician and actor Kid Cudi. The series premiered September 30, 2022, on Netflix.

In July 2023 it was announced that he would return to the stage playing Danny in the Off-Broadway revival of the John Patrick Shanley play Danny and the Deep Blue Sea. Abbott starred opposite his Black Bear costar Aubrey Plaza in the Sam Rockwell production, which was directed by Jeff Ward. The play ran from October 20, 2023 to January 13, 2024. In December 2023, Abbott had a meniscus tear during a performance, after which he had surgery. He performed the rest of the show's run on crutches.

In September 2024, it was reported that Abbott would join Florence Pugh in the Netflix adaptation of John Steinbeck's novel East of Eden, in the role of Adam Trask.

In 2026, he starred as Biff Loman in the Broadway revival of Arthur Miller's Death of a Salesman opposite Nathan Lane, Laurie Metcalf, and Ben Ahlers. The production was directed by Joe Mantello and played at the Winter Garden Theatre for a 22-week engagement, with previews beginning March 6, 2026. For this role, Abbott received a nomination for a Tony Award for Best Featured Actor in a Play.

In August 2026, it was announced that Abbott was cast to play Charles Xavier / Professor X in the Marvel Cinematic Universe starting with the untitled X-Men reboot directed by Jake Schreier, which has a planned 2028 release. In the documentary You Can See Everything (2026), Abbott was revealed to portray businessman Billy Evans in reenactments of footage of Evans and his partner Elizabeth Holmes that directors Nathan Fielder and Lance Oppenheim were unable to take on camera; Abbott's appearance in the film was kept secret until the film's premiere and general release.

== Personal life ==
Abbott lives in New York with his partner, actress Aubrey Plaza. He and Plaza met in 2019 on the set of the film Black Bear, then reunited in the off-Broadway production of Danny and the Deep Blue Sea. In April 2026, it was announced that they were expecting their first child. Their daughter was born in July 2026.

== Filmography ==
Key
†	Denotes films that have not yet been released

=== Film ===
Year	Title	Role	Notes
2011	Martha Marcy May Marlene	Max	
2012	Hello I Must Be Going	Jeremy	
2012	Art Machine	Cap'n Tar	
2013	All That I Am	Christian	
2014	The Sleepwalker	Andrew	
2014	A Most Violent Year	Louis Servidio	
2015	James White	James White	
2015	Criminal Activities	Warren	
2016	Whiskey Tango Foxtrot	Fahim Ahmadzai	
2016	Katie Says Goodbye	Bruno	
2017	Sweet Virginia	Elwood	
2017	It Comes at Night	Will	
2018	Tyrel	Johnny	
2018	Piercing	Reed	
2018	First Man	David Scott	
2018	Vox Lux	The Journalist	
2020	Black Bear	Gabe	
2020	Possessor	Colin Tate	
2020	The World to Come	Finney	
2021	On the Count of Three	Kevin	
2021	The Forgiven	Tom Day	
2022	Sanctuary	Hal Porterfield	
2023	Poor Things	Gen. Alfred 'Alfie' Blessington	
2024	Swimming Home	Joe	
2024	It Doesn't Matter	Chris	
2024	Bring Them Down	Michael O'Shea	
2024	Kraven the Hunter	The Foreigner	
2025	Wolf Man	Blake Lovell / Wolf Man	
2025	The Testament of Ann Lee	Abraham Standerin	
2026	You Can See Everything	Billy Evans	

=== Television ===
Year	Title	Role	Notes
2009	Nurse Jackie	Andy Singer	Episode: "Pill-O-Matix"
2010	Law & Order: Criminal Intent	Kyle Wyler	Episode: "Lost Children of the Blood"
2012–2016	Girls	Charlie Dattolo	Recurring role; 13 episodes
2013	Enlightened	Travis	Episode: "Higher Power"
2017	The Sinner	Mason Tannetti	Main role (season 1)
2019	Catch-22	John Yossarian	Miniseries; 6 episodes
2022	Entergalactic	Reed	Voice role; television special
2022	Ramy	Silvak	Episode: "That's What She Said"
2023	The Crowded Room	Stan Camisa	Miniseries; 5 episodes
2026	East of Eden	Adam Trask	Miniseries; 7 episodes

=== Theatre ===
Year	Title	Role	Theater	Ref.
2008	Good Boys and True	Justin	Second Stage Theatre	
2008	Mouth to Mouth	Phillip	Acorn Theatre	
2010	That Face	Henry	Manhattan Theatre Club	
2011	The House of Blue Leaves	Ronnie Shaughnessy	Walter Kerr Theatre	
2013	Where We're Born	Tony	Rattlestick Playwrights Theater	
2014	Fool for Love	Martin	Williamstown Theatre Festival	
2015	John	Elias Schreiber-Hoffman	Signature Theatre	
2016	The Rose Tattoo	Alvaro Mangiacavallo	Williamstown Theatre Festival	
2023	Danny and the Deep Blue Sea	Danny	Lucille Lortel Theatre	
2026	Death of a Salesman	Biff	Winter Garden Theatre	

== Awards and nominations ==
Year	Award	Category	Work	Result	Ref.
2011	Gotham Award	Best Ensemble Cast	Martha Marcy May Marlene (shared with ensemble cast)	Nominated	
2013	SXSW Film Festival	Ensemble Cast	All That I Am (shared with ensemble cast)	Won	
2015	Chicago Film Critics Association	Best Actor	James White	Nominated	
2015	Chicago International Film Festival	Emerging Artist Award	James White	Won	
2015	Detroit Film Critics Society	Best Actor	James White	Nominated	
2015	Gotham Award	Best Actor	James White	Nominated	
2015	Hamptons International Film Festival	Breakthrough Performer	James White	Won	
2016	Independent Spirit Awards	Best Male Lead	James White	Nominated	
2016	International Cinephile Society Awards	Best Actor	James White	Nominated	
2016	Berkshire Theatre Award	Outstanding Performance by a Male Actor	The Rose Tattoo	Nominated	
2020	Golden Globe Award	Best Actor – Miniseries or Television Film	Catch-22	Nominated	
2024	Lucille Lortel Awards	Outstanding Lead Performer in a Play	Danny and the Deep Blue Sea	Nominated	
2026	Drama League Awards	Distinguished Performance	Death of a Salesman	Nominated	
2026	Outer Critics Circle Awards	Featured Performer in a Broadway Play	Death of a Salesman	Nominated	
2026	Tony Awards	Best Performance by a Featured Actor in a Play	Death of a Salesman	Nominated	
2026	Dorian Award	Outstanding Featured Performance in a Broadway Play	Death of a Salesman	Nominated	
