= James White (film) =

2015 American drama film by Josh Mond

- Theatrical release poster
- Directed by: Josh Mond
- Written by: Josh Mond
- Produced by: Max Born; Antonio Campos; Sean Durkin; Melody C. Roscher; F.A. Eric Schultz
- Starring: Christopher Abbott; Cynthia Nixon; Scott Mescudi; Makenzie Leigh; David Call; Ron Livingston
- Cinematography: Mátyás Erdély
- Edited by: Matthew Hannam
- Music by: Scott Mescudi
- Production companies: BorderLine Films; Relic Pictures
- Distributed by: The Film Arcade
- Release dates: January 23, 2015 (Sundance Film Festival); November 13, 2015 (United States)
- Running time: 85 minutes
- Country: United States
- Language: English
- Box office: $101,368

James White is a 2015 American drama film written and directed by Josh Mond. The film stars Christopher Abbott, Cynthia Nixon, Scott Mescudi, Ron Livingston, Makenzie Leigh and David Call. James, a twenty-something New Yorker, struggles to take control of his self-destructive behavior in the face of momentous family challenges. This was Zazie Beetz's film debut.

James White premiered at the 2015 Sundance Film Festival where it won the NEXT Audience Award. The film received a limited release on November 13, 2015, by The Film Arcade.

== Plot ==
James White is a 20-something unemployed man who lives with his divorced, terminally ill mother, Gail, in New York. He attends his father's funeral and meets his dad's new wife Karen at the service. His friend Nick, who works at a resort in Mexico, is in attendance. His father's friend, Ben, who works for a magazine, offers James his condolences and says maybe he could find him a job. Jim considers himself a writer. James tells his mom he really needs to get away and is going back with Nick to Mexico. Gail reminds him that she needs him. They each think they have taken care of the other the past four years.

James is partying in Mexico. He meets a young girl, Jayne, who also likes drugs and alcohol. Gail calls and tells James she needs her son to come home. Jayne's also from New York so she returns with him and he learns she is in high school. His mom is in the emergency room and he cannot get any care for her. Finally the doctor explains she needs hospice more than the hospital. He cannot understand why he does not know any of this. Gail knows what year it is and who the president is so she can go home. James, Nick and Jayne go to a party, drinking and dancing, James is overcome with his responsibilities. He gets a black eye in a barroom fight. They all wake up in a motel room the next morning.

James goes for a job interview with Ben. He takes a hand-written writing sample and smells of alcohol. Ben tells him that even though he is a family friend, there is no job available for him. At home he lies and tells his mom he got the job. Gail then has a spell where she cannot speak, which she believes to be just a brain freeze.

That night, Gail's temperature spikes to over 103 degrees. The doctor says to use wet towels and Tylenol. Gail throws up; James feels very distraught and helpless. He takes his mom to the bathroom, where she does her business, but loses her strength to return to bed. James tries to take her out of the experience with an experiment: he tells her to imagine they are in Paris with the wind and lights. James notes how he is married with two children. As grandmother, she takes the kids to all the museums and goes to the Louvre to see the Mona Lisa. Gail has a new husband, and the two of them are happy in this hypothetical. She returns to bed and her temperature drops back down to a stable 100 degrees.

Later, Gail and James have a heart-to-heart conversation. She says "I know we never talk about your father, but without him, there never would have been you." A month later, James tells her he loves her. Suddenly, James feels like he is having a panic attack. James returns and his mother has died. He closes her eyes. Nick comes in and as James leaves, he hands him some money. James then goes out on the street to smoke a cigarette, and stares blankly into space.

== Cast ==
- Christopher Abbott as James White
- Cynthia Nixon as Gail White
- Scott Mescudi as Nick
- Makenzie Leigh as Jayne
- David Call as Elliott
- Scott Cohen as Barry White
- Ron Livingston as Ben

== Production ==
Josh Mond started writing the script to explore and understand his own feelings after losing his mother to cancer in 2011. During the writing of the script, Mond listened to the albums of Scott Mescudi, also known by his stage name Kid Cudi. They served as inspiration and motivation. Kid Cudi went on to curate the film's music.

In the middle of writing the script, Mond made an experimental short film precursor called ‘1009’ and had his close-friend, actor Christopher Abbott play the leading role. After the short, he decided that the part of James White was going to be written for Abbott. Abbott based his performance on people he'd met, especially New Yorkers, Josh Mond and himself. Cynthia Nixon met up with Mond after reading the script. Mond and Nixon bonded over the fact that they both were from Manhattan with artsy parents. Unfortunately, both Nixon and Mond's mothers died of cancer, and Nixon herself is a cancer survivor. She based her performance on Mond's mother and her own mother as well, even wearing her mother's jewelry in the film. Actor-director Mark Webber, a friend of Mond's, sent his former colleague Mescudi the script. Mescudi joined the film and later scored the film.

Mond has said that the film was semi-autobiographical and "very personal."

The film started shooting in New York City in December 2013. The shooting lasted 18 days in New York and another 4 days were spent shooting in Mexico. Borderline Films, the production company founded by Mond, Antonio Campos and Sean Durkin, launched a Kickstarter crowdfunding campaign to finance the film's post-production editing costs and music rights.

== Release ==
The film premiered at the 2015 Sundance Film Festival, where it won the NEXT Audience Award. It also screened at the 2015 Toronto International Film Festival and at the 2015 AFI Fest where it won the American Independents Audience Award. The film received a limited release on November 13, 2015 by distributors The Film Arcade.

== Reception ==
James White has met with critical acclaim. On the review aggregator website Rotten Tomatoes, the film has a 92% approval rating based on reviews from 71 critics, with an average rating of 7.4 out of 10. The site's critical consensus states: "Led by powerfully complementary performances from Christopher Abbott and Cynthia Nixon, James White offers an affecting calling card for debuting writer-director Josh Mond." On Metacritic the film has received a weighted average score of 83 out of 100 based on 25 critics, indicating "universal acclaim".

== Awards and nominations ==
List of Accolades
Award / Film Festival	Category	Recipient(s)	Result
American Independents / AFI Fest	Audience Award	Josh Mond	Won
Chicago Film Critics Association	Best Actor	Christopher Abbott	Nominated
Chicago Film Critics Association	Best Supporting Actress	Cynthia Nixon	Nominated
Chicago International Film Festival	Emerging Artist Award	Josh Mond	Won
Chicago International Film Festival	Emerging Artist Award	Christopher Abbott	Won
Deauville Film Festival	Revelations Prize	Josh Mond	Won
Deauville Film Festival	Grand Special Prize	Josh Mond	Nominated
Detroit Film Critics Society	Best Supporting Actress	Cynthia Nixon	Nominated
Detroit Film Critics Society	Best Actor	Christopher Abbott	Nominated
Gotham Awards	Best Actor	Christopher Abbott	Nominated
Gotham Awards	Bingham Ray Breakthrough Director Award	Josh Mond	Nominated
Hamburg Film Festival	Young Talent Award	Josh Mond	Nominated
Hamptons International Film Festival	Breakthrough Performer	Christopher Abbott	Won
Independent Spirit Awards	Best First Feature	Josh Mond, Sean Durkin, Antonio Campos, Max Born, Melody Roscher, Eric Schultz	Nominated
Independent Spirit Awards	Best Supporting Female	Cynthia Nixon	Nominated
Independent Spirit Awards	Best Male Lead	Christopher Abbott	Nominated
Locarno International Film Festival	Don Quixote Award - Special Mention	Josh Mond	Won
Locarno International Film Festival	Junior Jury Award	Josh Mond	Nominated
Locarno International Film Festival	Golden Leopard	Josh Mond	Nominated
National Board of Review	Top 10 Independent Films	Josh Mond	Won
Online Film Critics Society	Best Supporting Actress	Cynthia Nixon	Nominated
Sundance Film Festival	Best of Next! Audience Award	Josh Mond	Won
