= The Runarounds (soundtrack) =

The Runarounds (Prime Video Original Series Soundtrack)

Soundtrack album by The Runarounds
- Released: September 1, 2025
- Recorded: 2025
- Genre: Pop rock
- Length: 54:45
- Label: Arista Records

Singles from The Runarounds (Prime Video Original Series Soundtrack)
- 1. "Funny How the Universe Works" Released: August 7, 2020; 2. "Senior Year" Released: August 7, 2020

The Runarounds (Prime Video Original Series Soundtrack) is the soundtrack album of the American musical teen drama web television series The Runarounds by the band The Runarounds. Both soundtrack and series were released on September 1, 2025.

== Background ==
The band members, Axel Ellis, Zende Murdock, William Lipton, Jesse Golliher and Jeremy Yun, wrote every new track for the show.

== Track listing ==
The Runarounds (Prime Video Original Series Soundtrack)
No.	Title	Writer(s)	Producer(s)	Length
1.	"Downtown"	Axel Ellis, Zende Murdock, William Lipton, Jesse Golliher, Jeremy Yun	Jonas Pate, Alex Collier	5:56
2.	"Ghosts"	Matthew Blair, Ellis, Murdock, Lipton, Golliher, Yun	Pate, Collier	2:43
3.	"Senior Year"	Ellis, Murdock, Lipton, Golliher, Yun	Pate, Collier	4:01
4.	"Minivan"	Blair, Ellis, Murdock, Lipton, Golliher, Yun	Pate, Collier	2:54
5.	"Hypocrites"	Blair, Ellis, Murdock, Lipton, Golliher, Yun	Pate, Collier	3:19
6.	"Sophia (Jam)"	Ellis, Madison Love, Murdock, Lipton, Golliher, Yun	M. Love, Colin Love, Pate, Collier	2:11
7.	"Shoelaces"	Blair, Ellis, Murdock, Lipton, Golliher, Yun	Pate, Collier	2:25
8.	"Arrythmia (I Hope You Stay)"	Blair, Ellis, Murdock, Lipton, Golliher, Yun	Pate, Collier	3:32
9.	"15 Rootbeers"	Blair, Ellis, Murdock, Lipton, Golliher, Yun	Pate, Collier	1:49
10.	"Beautiful Stranger"	Ellis, M. Love, Murdock, Lipton, Golliher, Yun	Pate, Collier	4:09
11.	"It's A Wash"	Ellis, Murdock, Lipton, Golliher, Yun	Pate, Collier	3:10
12.	"Killed My Youth"	David Richard Bassett, Ellis, Murdock, Lipton, Golliher, Yun	Pate, Collier	3:36
13.	"Funny How The Universe Works"	Ellis, Murdock, Lipton, Golliher, Yun	Pate, Collier	5:07
14.	"Cellophane"	Blair, Ellis, Murdock, Lipton, Golliher, Yun	Pate, Collier	2:47
15.	"Stampede"	Ellis, Murdock, Lipton, Golliher, Yun	Pate, Collier	1:19
16.	"Valerie"	Abi Harding, Boyan Chowdhury, Dave McCabe, Russ Pritchard, Sean Payne	Pate, Collier	4:23
17.	"Surrender"	Rick Nielsen	Pate, Collier	1:15
Total length:				54:45
