= Lilah Pate =

American actress

- Pate in 2026
- Occupation: Actress
- Years active: 2020–
- Father: Jonas Pate
- Relatives: Josh Pate (uncle)

Lilah Pate is an American film and television actress. She is known for her role as Sophia Kinney in the Prime Video series The Runarounds.

== Career ==
She had a role as Gigi in the American television series The Summer I Turned Pretty and as Peeler in Netflix adventure series Outer Banks.

In 2024, she could be seen in the Mel Gibson-directed horror film Monster Summer. That year, she was cast to portray Samantha, the girlfriend of the character Jeremy, played by Sam Nivola, in the Bobby Farrelly film Driver's Ed.

She has a leading role as Sophia Kinney in 2025 musical drama television series The Runarounds on Amazon Prime Video. That year, she filmed a role in the Rebel Wilson comedy film Girl Group as a member of the fictional band Xplode.

== Personal life ==
She is the daughter of Jennifer and Jonas Pate, who is an American screenwriter, director and producer, and niece of Josh Pate.

== Filmography ==
Key
†	Denotes works that have not yet been released

Year	Title	Role	Notes
2020–2024	Outer Banks	Peeler	8 episodes
2022	The Summer I Turned Pretty	Gigi	6 episodes
2024	Monster Summer	Ellie	Film
2025	The Runarounds	Sophia Kinney	Lead role
2025	Driver's Ed	Samantha	Film
TBA	Girl Group†		Film
TBA	Frisco King †	London	
