= Ax and the Hatchetmen =

American band

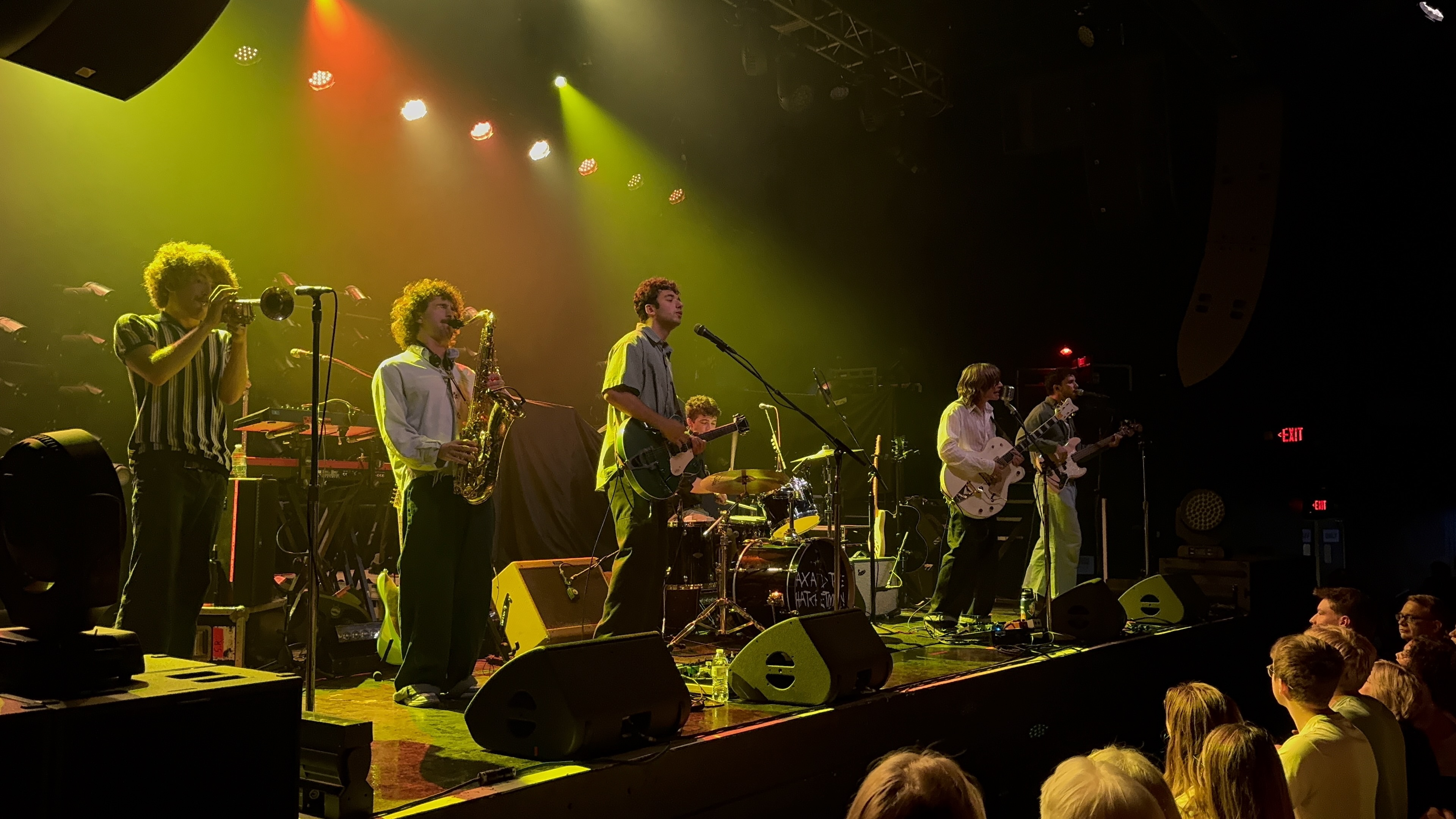
- Ax and the Hatchetmen in 2025

Background information
- Origin: Chicago, Illinois
- Genres: Alternative rock; indie rock; power pop; pop rock
- Years active: 2018–present
- Label: Arista Records
- Members: Axel Ellis; Salvatore Defilippis; Quinn Dolan; Hunter Olshefke; Phil Pistone; Chaandmon Croft
- Past members: Kenny Olzewski; Nick Deputy
- Website: axandthehatchetmen.com

Ax and the Hatchetmen are an American alternative/indie rock band formed in Chicago in 2018. Members of the group include Axel Ellis (lead vocals and guitar), Salvatore Defilippis (vocals/guitar), Hunter Olshefke (vocals/bass), Phil Pistone (trumpet), Quinn Dolan (saxophone), and Chaandmon Croft (drums). They are signed with Arista Records and their first album, So Much to Tell You, was released October 24, 2025 with a tour of the same name.

== History ==
The band had its start when Defilippis posted a fingerstyle acoustic guitar video and Ellis messaged him on Instagram. Ellis, Defilippis, Olshefke, Dolan, Nick Deputy (drums, who left the band in April 2026), and Kenny Olzewski (vocals/guitar, who left the band in October 2023) were members of the Midwest Young Artists in Fort Sheridan jazz band, and Pistone was a student at a nearby jazz conservatory. Croft joined as drummer when Deputy left, after serving as a music production assistant on The Runarounds and on the sound department for The Runarounds' music video Bleachers.

Ellis, who is from Lake Villa, a northern suburb of Chicago, plays a Gretsch White Falcon guitar given to him by his father. Ellis' father coined the band's name, and Ellis writes the song lyrics that all members then revise and set to music collaboratively. "Having fun is the basis of the songs," Ellis says. The band won the Evanston Battle of the Bands in 2019, which earned them ten free studio hours to record their first EP at Gremlin Recording Studios.

In their early years, the band members alternated between weekend gigs and weekdays at college. Ellis attended music school at Columbia College Chicago, Olshefke studied business at the College of Lake County, and Pistone studied music at Northern Illinois University.

The band's popularity grew as they capitalized on the rise of TikTok, posting frequently and amassing 150,000 TikTok followers and 15.7 thousand Instagram followers by early 2022. The band's grueling commitment to posting on social media is chronicled in their song, Existential Crisis Pt. 1. They signed an initial licensing deal with Frty Fve, a streaming and social media independent label, and in 2022 completed two headlining tours and released four singles. By summer 2026 the band had amassed 3 million monthly Spotify listeners.

== Early releases (2019–2024) ==
=== Bear on the Roof EP (2019) ===
The EP included the songs Peach Trees, Silhouette, Sleeping in my Jeans, Goofy, and What's New. Silhouette garnered one million streams within its first year, and their first breakout hit, Peach Trees, reached two million streams in 2021.

=== Ax and the Hatchetmen Live on Audiotree (2023) ===
With this live EP recording, the band released the songs Goofy, Victim, Utah, Drive-In Movie, Existential Crisis Pt 1, and MAKO/OK:AM.

=== Love Songs EP (2024) ===
This EP included Love Songs, with its "sunny and summery" sound, and Where the f Did I Park My Car?, both recorded live on tape and released on August 16, 2024, accompanied by their first music video.

The song Sunscreen, cowritten with Ellis, Defilippis, Kacey Smith and the band's producer Jake Sinclair, was released as a single in July 2024.

=== Constant Change EP (2024) ===
Described as "a dizzy swirl of gritty garage-rock, psychedelic jangle, and jammy dynamism" that "beams good vibes," the EP released via Arista records includes the previously unreleased 7 x 9 that had its start as a Rivers Cuomo demo that was sourced in part by the band's producer Jake Sinclair (Panic! At the Disco, Weezer, Avril Lavigne). Ellis and Defilippis acknowledged the collaboration with Rivers Cuomo from Weezer that took place via an app called RiverTunes that Cuomo had created. The music video for 7 x 9 was released on July 17, 2025.

The EP also includes the songs Victim, Hotel Room, Blurry Lights, and Stay//Honestly.

Blurry Lights, released as a music video on April 3, 2025, features a collaboration with Albert Hammond of The Strokes. Ellis noted that their producer Jake Sinclair and Hammond have children that attend the same school in the Los Angeles, which led Hammond to listen to and then provide a distorted guitar track on the song.Blurry Lights peaked at #30 on Billboard's Alternative Airplay chart.

The band released their Jam in the Van full set session on February 17, 2025, including the songs Flagstaff, Love Songs, and Sunscreen.

== So Much to Tell You (2025) and other releases ==
=== So Much to Tell You (2025) ===
The album was named Album of the Week when it was released on October 24, 2025 and includes the songs Red Carpet, Flagstaff, Love Songs, 7 x 9, Lucy, Oasis, Blurry Lights, Hotel Room, Model Citizen, Sunscreen, Stay//Honestly, and New Years. Some of the songs on the album had been in development for a long time. Ellis noted that Flagstaff's riff had evolved since its first iteration in 2019. The band released a deluxe version in March 2026.

Ellis's vocal stylings on Hotel Room, the opening number for the So Much to Tell You tour, has been described as "rustic but rich, textured like a vinyl record warming up under a needle." The song amassed 65 million streams globally. The song Model Citizen was described as "reminiscient of the opening track in a rebellious coming-of-age movie."

The album and its accompanying tour received critical acclaim, with the band recognized for its "edgy rock and superb chops." Olshefke has named Utah as his favorite song of their set from the album and tour, and Ellis likes the upbeat nature of Where the F did I park my car?

The release of the band's debut album came less than two months after the September 1, 2025 release of the Amazon Prime American teen television series The Runarounds, in which Ellis plays lead guitarist and vocalist Neil. Ellis is also vocalist and guitarist in the band by the same name, The Runarounds. Both bands Ax and the Hatchetmen and The Runarounds played numerous sold-out venues in the Fall of 2025 through the summer of 2026. Defilippis and Olshefke are also part of the band The Back Alley, formed in 2018. Their band opened for several Runarounds concerts.

=== Stick and Poke (2026) ===
The band released the EP Stick and Poke on September 25, 2026: the same day they performed for the first time at Red Rocks amphitheatre as the opening band for The Revivalists. The EP, produced by longtime collaborator Jake Sinclair, is described as "anthems of self-discovery" and nostalgia for the young love and friendships of the late teens and early twenties. The EP includes Funny Valentine, which is about how "Sometimes Cupid lets you down," according to Ellis. The EP also includes Loser, which was released in July 2026 and was described as a "summer rock anthem about self-doubt and messy relationships" and "a self-aware, fist-pumping ode to falling short." Several music blogs recommended that track. It also includes title track Stick & Poke, described as "light, catchy, and just a little bit sappy," with "bright, staccato vocals and personal lyrics, backed by the band's signature brass-led instrumentals, perfect for a sweet summer day." Ellis notes the song references a stick-and-poke kit he and his friends used to give one another tattoos during a youthful trip, noting, "Everybody eventually goes their separate ways but the ink on my body takes me right back to that garage, to being young and in love." The EP also includes the songs Prius and Dance to Different Songs.

Earlier, the band had released a cover of "Everybody Talks." They released the song Cheesecake in March 2026, with the music video for "Cheesecake", directed by Bobby Hanaford and featuring members of Ellis' family in cameo roles, released on March 25, 2026.

== Tours and Concert Venues ==
The band played in the 2023 Chicago Lollapalooza lineup, for the Atlanta Shaky Knees and Charlotte Lovin' Life music festivals in 2024, and the Mighty Roots Music Festival that took place in Clarksdale, Mississippi, halfway between Memphis, TN and Oxford, MS, in 2025. They played Summerfest 2026 in Milwaukee and Bonnaroo in Manchester TN.

Their Summer and Fall 2025 tours included stops in Anaheim, Pioneertown, and San Diego,CA, Phoenix, Sandy and Salt Lake City, UT, Denver, Kansas City, Omaha, NE, Minneapolis, MN, Fargo, ND, Madison, WI, Carmel, IN, Palm Springs, CA, Chicago, Las Vegas, Tampa, Charleston, South Carolina, and Cleveland and Columbus, OH, opening for Fitz and the Tantrums in summer 2025, headlining with indie band Foxtide in fall 2025, and supporting the Australian indie group Royel Otis in summer 2026 and Mt. Joy in fall 2026.

They performed at Red Rocks Amphitheatre near Morrison, Colorado and embarked on their Late Checkout tour in October 2026.

== Discography ==
=== Albums ===
- So Much to Tell You (2025)
- So Much to Tell You (Deluxe) (2026)

=== Extended Plays ===
- Bear on the Roof (2020)
- Love Songs (2024)
- Constant Change (2025)
- Stick and Poke (2026)

=== Singles ===
Title	Year	Peak chart positions	Album
Title	Year	US Alternative	Album
"Mako"	2021	—	—N/a
"Existential Crisis, Pt. 1"	2022	—	—N/a
"Beezlebub"	2022	—	—N/a
"Grace"	2022	—	—N/a
"Utah"	2022	—	—N/a
"Where tf Did I Park My Car"	2024	—	—N/a
"Mele Kalikimaka"	2024	—	—N/a
"Stay // Honestly"	2025	—	So Much to Tell You
"Blurry Lights" (feat. Albert Hammond Jr.)	2025	30	So Much to Tell You
"Hotel Room"	2025	—	So Much to Tell You
"Oasis"	2025	—	So Much to Tell You
"Cheesecake"	2026	—	"So Much to Tell You (Deluxe)"
"Loser"	2026		

== Members ==
Current members

- Axel Ellis – lead vocals, guitar (2018–present)
- Salvatore Defilippis – guitar, backing vocals (2018–present)
- Hunter Olshefke – bass, backing vocals (2018–present)
- Phil Pistone - trumpet (2018-present)
- Quinn Dolan - saxophone (2018-present)
- Chaandmon Croft – drums (2026–present)

Former members

- Kenny Olzewski – guitar, backing vocals (2018–2023)
- Nick Deputy – drums (2018–2026)
