= Khalil Everage =

American actor

Khalil Everage (born January 6, 2001) is an American actor. He portrayed August Monroe opposite Anthony Anderson in the 2019 Netflix film Beats (2019). He also played Sian Cotton in Shooting Stars (2023). He also played Sean in the 2023 film The Crusades opposite Rudy Pankow and Indiana Massara. On television, he is known for playing Chris in Cobra Kai.

Everage is from Chicago and attended the Chicago High School for the Arts. He was born to Dina and Khaldun “Khal” Everage and is the nephew of Jonathan McReynolds.

== Filmography ==
=== Film ===
Year	Title	Role	Notes
2018	Karma (Chicago)	Shawn	Short film
2019	Beats	August Monroe	
2023	Shooting Stars	Sian Cotton	
2023	The Crusades	Sean	
2025	The Cobra Kai Movie Part II	Himself	Short film

=== Television ===
Year	Title	Role	Notes
2019	The Chi	Little Big Man	1 episode
2019–2025	Cobra Kai	Chris	Recurring role (seasons 2–6)
