= The Runarounds (TV series) =

American teen drama television series

- Release poster
- Genre: Teen drama
- Created by: Jonas Pate
- Starring: William Lipton; Axel Ellis; Jesse Golliher; Zendé Murdock; Jeremy Yun; Lilah Pate; Kelley Pereira; Maximo Salas; Marley Aliah; Shea Pritchard; Mark Wystrach; Hayes MacArthur; Brooklyn Decker
- Country of origin: United States
- Original language: English
- No. of seasons: 1
- No. of episodes: 8

Production
- Executive producers: Josh Pate; David Wilcox; Jonas Pate; Shannon Burke; Joon Yun; Lisa Mae Fincannon; Scott Lambert; David Ellison; Dana Goldberg; Matt Thunell
- Running time: 55–68 minutes
- Production companies: Rockfish Films; Idle Hands Typewriter Company; Skydance Television; Amazon MGM Studios

Original release
- Network: Amazon Prime Video
- Release: September 1, 2025

The Runarounds is an American musical teen drama television series created by Jonas Pate for Amazon Prime Video, with a teleplay by David Wilcox. Josh Pate, and Shannon Burke are among the executive producers. The series premiered on September 1, 2025. In April 2026, the series was canceled after one season.

== Premise ==
In Wilmington, North Carolina, a disparate group of high school graduates form a rock band.

== Cast and characters ==
=== Main ===
- William Lipton as Charlie Cooper, lead singer and guitarist
- Axel Ellis as Neil Crosby, singer and guitarist
- Jesse Golliher as Wyatt Wysong, bassist
- Zendé Murdock as Bez Willis, drummer
- Jeremy Yun as Topher Park, guitarist
- Lilah Pate as Sophia Kinney, Charlie's crush
- Kelley Pereira as Amanda
- Maximo Salas as Pete Antuna, the band manager
- Marley Aliah as Ruthie Bender
- Shea Pritchard as George Benson
- Mark Wystrach as Catesby, Hannah's high school boyfriend
- Hayes MacArthur as Finn, Charlie's dad
- Brooklyn Decker as Hannah, Charlie's mom

=== Supporting ===
- Dani Deetté as Wendy, Wyatt's mom
- Willa Dunn as Tatum, Charlie's sister
- Darin Heames as Dusty, Neil's dad
- Gillian Vigman as Nora, Topher's mom
- Woody Fu as Edward, Topher's dad
- Rey Hernandez as Rick, Pete's dad
- Lindsey Rubino as Mandy, Pete's stepmom
- Timeca Seretti as Niecy, Bez's mom
- Cranston Johnson as Theo, Bez's dad
- Jennifer Daley as Danny Mace
- Joshua Mikel as Spider
- Jordan Sherley as Maya
- MacKenzie Porter as Phoebe, lead singer in a band
- Jason Alan Carvell as Lawrence McGill
- Adam Aalderks as Jeremy Jones
- Emme Sibulkin as Izzy
- Lydia Night as Kelsey, in Phoebe's band
- Annika Cowles as Allison, in Phoebe's band
- Alitha Tuttle as Tatiana
- J. Anthony Crane as Sandford
- Chevy Cofield as Policeman
- Timothy Flood as Party Goer

== Music ==
A soundtrack for the series was released on September 1, 2025.

== Episodes ==
No.	Title	Directed by	Written by	Original release date
1	"Pilot"	Jonas Pate	Story by : Jonas Pate; Teleplay by : David Wilcox	September 1, 2025
Charlie Cooper is about to graduate from high school and wants his newly formed band, Futhermucker, to get signed by a label before the end of summer. The band consists of his friends Topher Park, Neil Crosby and Pete Antuna. The band plays at a party that Pete is hosting at his house. They start well, but things go downhill quickly when Pete, who is on drums, starts playing offbeat. This causes a guy in the crowd, Bez, to heckle them. The band tries again, but the same thing happens. Pete goes to confront Bez, but he falls, breaks his nose, sets his house on fire, and the party ends. While Pete is being checked out by EMS, the rest of the band says they need to replace him before playing at a graduation party. They have auditions where they are surprised to see Bez show up. He blows them away. Bez and his best friend, Wyatt, who plays bass, join the band. Pete becomes their manager. Topher's girlfriend, Amanda, does not approve of him being in a band since they are both Princeton-bound. At the party Topher introduces the band as The Runarounds. Songs: "Senior Year"; "Sophia"
2	"Morning Glory"	Jonas Pate	David Wilcox & Jonas Pate	September 1, 2025
Now officially The Runarounds, the band faces their first major hurdle: original music. Charlie struggles with crippling writer's block, unable to produce a new song worthy of their new potential, especially as he tries to impress Sophia Kinney, his literary-minded crush. In a moment of artistic frustration and desperation for inspiration, Charlie takes a risk that could have serious consequences for his future. Meanwhile, Pete, keen to prove his worth as the manager, aggressively works the local scene to secure paying gigs, sometimes stretching the truth in the process. His ambition puts the band on the map but potentially in over their heads. Elsewhere, Neil is completely distracted from the music when he instantly falls for a mysterious, free-spirited girl, spending more time pursuing a whirlwind romance than practicing, and neglecting what could be a connection with someone closer to him. Songs: "Funny How the Universe Works"; "Beautiful Stranger"
3	"Nice Day For a (Weird Wedding)"	Jonas Pate	Jonas Pate & David Wilcox	September 1, 2025
Pete's relentless pursuit of opportunities pays off when he books The Runarounds a gig at a profoundly eccentric, hippie wedding that is rumored to be attended by a local record label scout. The band sees the event as their chance to make a crucial first impression, but the unusual setting, strange guests, and a series of chaotic misadventures make keeping their performance professional a nearly impossible task. Charlie is focused on the gig but increasingly distracted by the time he spends with Sophia, whose own complex home life—specifically dealing with her alcoholic father—brings them closer. The band must navigate the delicate balance of delivering a killer set while staying out of trouble with the unconventional wedding party, all while hoping the industry eyes in the room are paying attention to the music and not the mayhem. Songs: "Surrender"
4	"Three Grand, Five Songs, Four Days"	Steven Tsuchida	David Wilcox & Jonas Pate	September 1, 2025
The band manages to pool their resources and book a valuable four-day session at a professional recording studio. The experience is intense, as they face the high-stakes pressure of spending thousands of dollars to record five songs in a tight timeframe. The stress begins to fray the members' nerves, leading to heated disagreements over musical direction and arrangements, particularly between Charlie and Topher. The band's cohesion is further threatened when Bez is presented with a compelling offer to join a more established, higher-paying touring act, forcing him to seriously consider abandoning The Runarounds for a seemingly more secure future. As time ticks down, the guys must figure out if their shared dream and friendship are strong enough to keep the band from falling apart in the studio. Songs: "Cellophane"; "Arrythmia (I Hope You Stay)"; "Shoelaces"; "Killed My Youth"
5	"Ride the Wave"	Jonas Pate	Ilana Wolpert	September 1, 2025
Seeking a much-needed escape and a break from their local troubles, the band spontaneously packs into a minivan for a road trip up the coast. The trip is a blur of youthful exuberance, reckless decisions, and small-town gigs, but it soon evolves into a raw exploration of their individual insecurities and complicated backstories. Away from home, long-held secrets among the members come to the surface, and their loyalties are severely tested. The forced proximity and shared experiences ultimately forge a deeper bond between them, but not without some emotional damage. By the end of the trip, they gain a clearer understanding of each other's motivations and the sacrifices they each need to make to truly become a cohesive musical unit. Songs: "It's A Wash"
6	"Been Caught Stealing"	Kyra Sedgwick	Nora Kirkpatrick	September 1, 2025
Recharged and closer than ever after their road trip, The Runarounds return to Wilmington with renewed energy and excitement for their music. Their momentum is abruptly halted, however, when they discover their practice space has been broken into and all their instruments and equipment have been stolen. This devastating loss threatens to stop their journey entirely, as they lack the funds to replace the gear. The band and their circle of friends, including Sophia and Pete, rally together, working multiple side jobs and desperately trying to track down the thieves, while grappling with the harsh reality of their financial situation and the criminal element lurking beneath their carefree summer. Songs: "Ghosts"; "Valerie"
7	"Hypocrites"	Jonas Pate	Jonas Pate & David Wilcox	September 1, 2025
Against all odds, the band gets a huge boost when a video of their newest song goes viral, attracting significant attention, including that of a major record label executive. The sudden fame puts immense pressure on The Runarounds to deliver a performance that will secure a contract. Meanwhile, the clock is ticking on their summer of freedom. Topher must make a final, agonizing decision about his academic future at Princeton, while Charlie's relationship with Sophia hits a critical point. With the possibility of a national tour looming, Charlie realizes the end of the summer could mean the end of his time with Sophia if he doesn't fully commit to the relationship now, forcing a tense confrontation about their future. Songs: "Minivan"; "Hypocrites"
8	"Kill Devil"	Jonas Pate	David Wilcox & Jonas Pate	September 1, 2025
The Runarounds secure the headline spot at the historic Kill Devil Ballroom, a make-or-break performance intended to seal the deal with the major record label. Backstage, tensions are at an all-time high, especially for Charlie, whose discovery about his real father completely shatters his world just before he steps on stage. Despite the chaos, the band delivers their best performance yet, only to be crushed when the label executive ultimately passes on signing them. Just as the guys are about to face the reality of breaking up and going their separate ways, their manager Pete drops a bombshell: their original champion, Danny Mace, has secured them a surprising half-million-dollar deal, giving them a second, massive chance to chase their dreams together. Songs: "Downtown"; "It's A Wash"

== Production ==
The Runarounds is produced by Skydance Television and created and executive produced by Jonas Pate, with a teleplay from David Wilcox. The series is executive produced by Josh Pate, Shannon Burke, Joon Yun, Lisa Mae Fincannon, Scott Lambert, David Ellison, Dana Goldberg, Matt Thunell and Wilcox.

The eight-part series is inspired by the real band of the same name and includes the real group's members, William Lipton, Axel Ellis, Jeremy Yun, Zendé Murdock and Jesse Golliher, amongst the cast. The Runarounds formed as a band in 2021, when Jonas Pate was casting for a group to appear on his Wilmington, North Carolina–set television series Outer Banks, with the group first performing together for Pate ahead of their appearance in season three of Outer Banks. They were selected from more than 5,000 musicians who responded to the casting call for Outer Banks.

In August 2024, Brooklyn Decker, Maximo Salas, Marley Aliah, Hayes MacArthur, Mark Wystrach, and Shea Pritchard joined the cast. The cast also includes Lilah Pate and Kelley Pereira. Filming began in August 2024. Filming locations include Wilmington, North Carolina.

Members of The Runarounds have expanded their presence beyond the screen by performing live shows, translating their on-screen chemistry into real-world performances. The group has played concerts and small venues while building a following, demonstrating that they function as an active band outside of the television series.

On April 3, 2026, Amazon Prime Video canceled the series after one season.

== Release ==
All eight episodes of The Runarounds were released on September 1, 2025.

== Reception ==
On Rotten Tomatoes, the series holds an approval rating of 60% based on 5 critic reviews.
