= Aidan Laprete =

American actor and singer (born 2001)

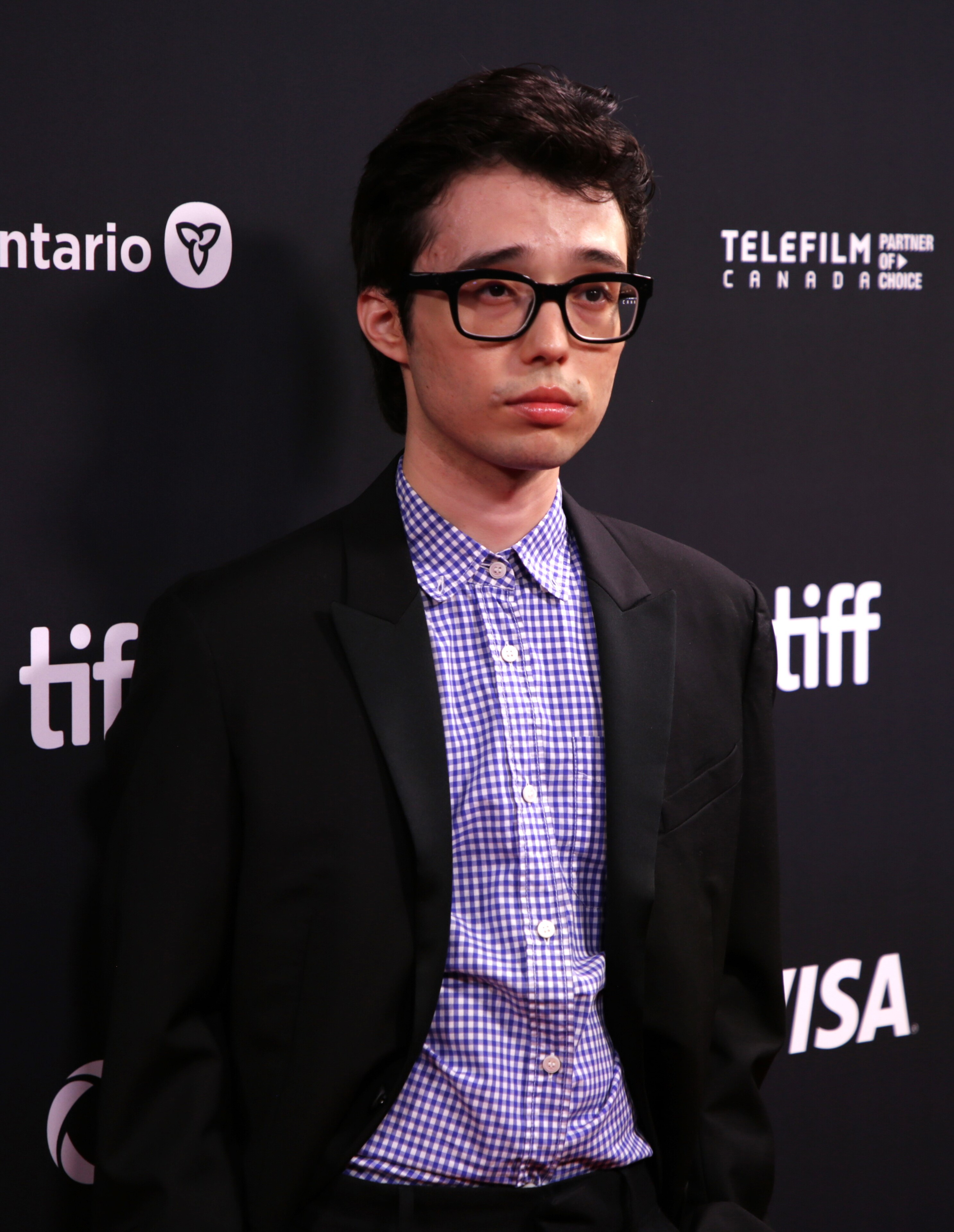
- Laprete in 2025 at TIFF.
- Born: Aidan James Laprete Powell; September 6, 2001 (age 25); Honolulu, Hawaii, U.S.
- Other names: Laprete, Aidan James
- Occupations: actor; singer; songwriter; musician; record producer
- Years active: 2010–present
- Website: lapretemusic.com

Aidan James Laprete Powell (/ləˈprɛt/; born September 6, 2001) is an American actor, singer, songwriter, and record producer. As an actor, he is known for his role as Henry Tanaka in The Wilds.

== Early life ==
Laprete was born on September 6, 2001, in Honolulu, Hawaii.

Laprete first started acting in commercials as a child. Laprete started playing the ukulele at age four, and started to sing at age eight. He started performing at age six in children's groups at local ukulele festivals.

== Career ==
At age eight, Laprete performed the song "Hey Soul Sister" by Train at the 2010 Ukulele Festival. On July 19, 2010, a video of this performance was uploaded by "elrollo79" onto YouTube. The video quickly went viral and has received over twenty million views. The video got the attention of a number of popular artists, among them Jack Johnson and Mick Fleetwood as well as Train's Pat Monahan who is reported to have called it his favorite cover version of the song.

In 2014, Laprete started releasing music under the artist name Aidan James. He went on a solo tour independently to the east and west coast promoting the music. In Washington, D.C., he performed on the steps of the Capitol Hill and did a private performance at the Google Headquarters. In 2015, Laprete was featured in HBO's documentary series, Saving My Tomorrow. He was handpicked to write a song for the show, which released on April 22, 2015. He joined the lineup for Train's 2016 Sail Across the Sun cruise, along with Phillip Phillips, Michael Franti, Andy Grammer, and Shaggy. Laprete's music videos were featured at Good Morning America's Summer Concert Series in Central Park, and an interview with ABC News was released on July 22, 2016. He currently releases and produces music under the name Laprete.

As an actor, Laprete has appeared in a variety of TV shows and films including The Pitt, The Paper, Chad, Everything's Gonna Be Okay, Alexa and Katie, Swiped and Under the Blood Red Sun.

In 2022, Laprete played the role of Henry Tanaka in the second season of the Amazon Prime Video series, The Wilds. Kristen Baldwin of Entertainment Weekly praised his performance, calling Laprete a "standout" amongst the ensemble cast.

In 2025, Laprete was cast as Yoshi in the Bobby Farrelly comedy film Driver's Ed. The film premiered at the Toronto International Film Festival. Michael Rechtshaffen of The Hollywood Reporter praised his performance, saying Laprete "handily steals every scene with his pitch-perfect deadpan line-readings", making “a lasting, tragicomic impression”. Rachel Labonte of Screen Rant said “Yoshi is easily the standout; Laprete’s oblivious line deliveries earned some of the biggest laughs”. Laprete appeared as blogger 'So Wesley' Holzwanger in the Peacock mockumentary series The Paper, a spinoff of the mockumentary series The Office. Entertainment Weekly called his performance the “perfect Gen Z stare”. He also appeared as Max Wilcox in the HBO Max medical drama The Pitt.

In 2026 Aidan was seen in The Social Reckoning playing an intern at The Wall Street Journal. Later that year he was cast in Takashi Yamazaki's first English language film Grandgear, which will be released in 2028.

== Filmography ==
=== Film ===
Year	Title	Role	Notes
2011	The Short List	Christian	Short film series
2011	Shave Ice Is Nice	Little Brother	Short film
2014	Under The Blood Red Sun	Rico	
2024	This Too Shall Pass	John	
2025	Swiped	Adam	
2025	Driver's Ed	Yoshi	
2026	The Social Reckoning	Zach	

=== Television ===
Year	Title	Role	Notes
2010	Hawaii Five-0	Self	Episode: "Ko'olauloa"
2015	Saving My Tomorrow	Self	Episode: "Part 4"; also composer of song "Back To Where We Came From"
2016	Adam DeVine's House Party	Aidan	Episode: "Sidekicks"
2018	Alexa & Katie	Boy	Episode: "Basketball"
2021	Chad	Kevin	3 episodes
2021	Everything's Gonna Be Okay	Warren	Episode: "Banded Argiope Spider"
2022	The Wilds	Henry Tanaka	Main role
2025	The Pitt	Max Wilcox	2 episodes
2025	The Paper	‘So Wesley’ Holzwanger	2 episodes
