= William Lipton =

American singer and actor (born 2003)

- Born: 2 June 2003 (age 23)
- Education: University of Southern California (BM)
- Occupations: Actor, Musician
- Years active: 2018–present
- Television: General Hospital
- Member of: The Runarounds

William Lipton (born June 2, 2003) is an American actor and musician. He portrayed Cameron Webber on General Hospital (2018-2024) and Charlie Cooper on the Prime Video series The Runarounds (2025). He attended high school in San Mateo, California and later studied music at the University of Southern California. A member of the Tau Kappa Epsilon fraternity, he graduated from the Thornton School of Music in 2025. He voiced and provided motion capture for Cpl. Joseph Dunn in the 2026 video game Call of Duty: Modern Warfare 4.

== Career ==
He portrayed Cameron Webber, the son of Elizabeth Webber (portrayed by Rebecca Herbst), in over 300 episodes of American daytime television soap opera General Hospital from 2018 on ABC, beginning on the show in the beginning of his sophomore year of high school. He left the show in 2023 with his character going to college but returned for holiday episodes broadcast in December 2024.

He has a leading role as Charlie Cooper, a guitarist and songwriter in the band The Runarounds desperate to get his band a recording contract, in 2025 musical drama television series The Runarounds on Amazon Prime Video. He became a member of the band when The Runarounds formed in 2021, selected from more than 5,000 musicians who responded to a casting call when writer and producer Jonas Pate was casting for a group to appear on the television series Outer Banks, with the group first performing together ahead of their appearance in season three of Outer Banks. His performances with the band include the Lovin' Life Music Fest in Charlotte, North Carolina in May 2025.

== Filmography ==
=== Television ===
Year	Title	Role	Notes
2018-2024	General Hospital	Cameron Webber	328 episodes
2025	The Runarounds	Charlie Cooper	Lead role

=== Video Games ===
Year	Title	Role	Notes	Ref.
2026	Call of Duty: Modern Warfare 4	Corporal Joseph Dunn	Voice and motion capture	
