= Maintenance Required (film) =

- Release poster
- Directed by: Lacey Uhlemeyer
- Written by: Lacey Uhlemeyer; Roo Berry; Erin Falconer
- Produced by: Matt Luber; Lena Roklin; Matt Williams
- Starring: Madelaine Petsch; Jacob Scipio; Madison Bailey; Katy O'Brian; Inanna Sarkis; Matteo Lane; Jim Gaffigan
- Cinematography: Hamish Doyne-Ditmas
- Edited by: Bruce Green
- Music by: Rob Lord
- Production companies: Amazon MGM Studios; Future Artists Entertainment; Luber Roklin Entertainment
- Distributed by: Amazon MGM Studios (via Prime Video)
- Release date: October 8, 2025
- Running time: 103 minutes
- Countries: United States; United Kingdom
- Language: English

Maintenance Required is a 2025 romantic comedy film directed and written by Lacey Uhlemeyer. The film follows Charlie, who while reevaluating her all-female mechanic shop, confides with Beau, an online confidant, who is actually a real-life business rival.

The film was released in the United States by Amazon MGM Studios as a Amazon Prime Video original film on October 8, 2025.

== Plot ==
Charlotte or "Charlie" has inherited her father's auto service shop in Oakland, where she is a mechanic. In her free time, she chats with "Bullnose" on an online forum about car-related issues as "GreaseMnky". Unbeknownst to her, "Bullnose" is actually Beau, a manager for big car company Miller Boys, which has just opened operations nearby to Charlie, becoming her competition.

Charlie is at her shop with her friends Kam and Izzy, when Beau enters to see his friend Jordan, who is finishing his manicure with Izzy. They discuss how Miller Boys' new location might pose problems for Charlie's business. Beau does not disclose he works for them.

Upon leaving the shop, Beau talks to his girlfriend Lola, who seems disinterested. Later, while having drinks at a bar he sees Charlie and invites her to play pool - with a wager. She beats Beau easily, as she has been playing for years.

Mr. Miller hears Beau's pitch on Electric Vehicles being the future, agreeing to look into it. Charlie visits Miller Boys and discovers Beau is one of them, and is upset he did not say so when they met. She changes a tire faster than a competitor - proof that she is a very good mechanic. Back at home, Charlie confides what happened to Bullnose in the chat room, unaware he is actually Beau.

A TV crew interviews Charlie, who states her father built the shop for the community - their all-female crew will not be bullied by a heartless corporation. A concerned woman complains to Miller boys about their putting a small enterprise out of business, but they justify it as a side-effect of capitalism. Charlie slowly begins to realize she cannot compete with their low prices.

Having chatted with Bullnose for a while, Charlie decides to meet him at a restaurant. Upon arriving, Beau sees that his date is actually Charlie, but approaches her as Beau rather than Bullnose. He guesses she is on a blind date, and proposes dinner with her instead of whoever stood her up. She spurns him and leaves, texting Bullnose to never speak to her again.

Bullnose pleads to be forgiven, but Charlie ignores him. An investor buys a classic car that was restored by Charlie, and she cries to her friends that she wishes the shop to be in the hands of someone who loves it just as she does. Deciding to give Bullnose a second chance, she agrees to meet him at a coffee shop.

Beau arrives, again without disclosing his online identity, inviting her to a classic car show. The next day, Mr. Miller is happy that Oakland is now among their top locations. He wants to conquer all of North America, but Beau quits because he no longer wants this.

Charlie goes to the classic cars show, where she sees Beau, and they connect over her photographs of the cars. She admits she enjoyed the day, and they drive out together, but are forced to stop at a lookout near the ocean as Beau's car gets overheated. She offers him a ride home, and they share a romantic moment.

However, Charlie recognizes Bullnose's car in his garage from a forum photo. Realizing Beau is actually Bullnose, she declares she feels like an idiot for not knowing this sooner. Charlie drives away, saying she can never trust him again.

One month later, Beau and Charlie have stopped communicating. Kam is working at Miller Boys and informs her that he quit weeks ago because he developed a corporate conscience, probably because of her. Charlie admits she now misses Beau, so calls him. His voicemail says he is on a road trip.

Jordan directs Charlie to a diner, where she finds him at a table. She casually asks if anyone knows how to change a tire. Talking, Beau divulges he left Miller Boys and apologizes for not being upfront with her before. Now closing a deal on a '68 Dodger that needs a lot of work, he wonders if Charlie could help him restore it. They then drive away together.

A year later, Charlie feels that someone, possibly her dad, is looking out for her, as she happily works with Beau on a car.

== Cast ==
- Madelaine Petsch as Charlie
- Jacob Scipio as Beau, an online confidant
- Madison Bailey as Izzy
- Katy O'Brian as Kam
- Inanna Sarkis as Lola
- Matteo Lane as Jordan
- Rob Rausch as Himself
- Jim Gaffigan as Mr. Miller

== Production ==
In September 2024, Madelaine Petsch and Jacob Scipio are announced to star in the film, with Petsch to also executive produce the film. On September 26, Katy O'Brian and Madison Bailey joined the cast of the film. Filming took place in August and September 2024.

Rob Lord was announced to be composing the score by March 7, 2025.

== Release ==
Maintenance Required was released in the United States as a Amazon Prime Video original on October 8, 2025.

== Reception ==
On the review aggregator website Rotten Tomatoes, 38% of 13 critics' reviews are positive, with an average rating of 3.8/10.
