= Driver's Ed (film) =

American comedy film

- Release poster
- Directed by: Bobby Farrelly
- Written by: Thomas Moffett
- Produced by: Jonas Pate; David Stone; Jennifer Pate
- Starring: Sam Nivola; Sophie Telegadis; Mohana Krishnan; Aidan Laprete; Molly Shannon; Kumail Nanjiani
- Cinematography: Itai Ne'eman
- Edited by: Julie Garces
- Music by: John Frizzell
- Production companies: AGC Studios; Jonas Pate Inc.; TFC Productions
- Distributed by: Vertical
- Release dates: September 12, 2025 (TIFF); May 15, 2026 (United States)
- Running time: 104 minutes
- Country: United States
- Language: English

Driver's Ed is a 2025 American comedy film directed by Bobby Farrelly, written by Thomas Moffett, and starring Sam Nivola, Kumail Nanjiani and Molly Shannon.

The film premiered at the 2025 Toronto International Film Festival, and was released in the United States by Vertical on May 15, 2026.

== Premise ==
A teenager steals the car of his driver's ed teacher to take his friends on a road trip to visit his college freshman girlfriend.

== Cast ==
- Sam Nivola as Jeremy
- Sophie Telegadis as Evie
- Mohana Krishnan as Aparna
- Aidan Laprete as Yoshi
- Molly Shannon as Principal Fisher
- Kumail Nanjiani as Mr. Rivers
- Lilah Pate as Samantha
- Alyssa Milano as Dr. Goodman
- Ella Stiller as Dakota
- Abe Farrelly as Nurse
- Apple Farrelly as Grad Student RA
- Bob Farrelly as Hutty

== Production ==
The film is directed by Bobby Farrelly and written by Thomas Moffett. Producers include Jonas Pate, Jennifer Pate and David Stone. It is co-produced by AGC Studios and TFC Productions. It has Sam Nivola, Kumail Nanjiani and Molly Shannon leading the cast. In March 2025, Sophie Telegadis, Mohana Krishnan, Aidan Laprete, Lilah Pate and Alyssa Milano joined the cast. Principal photography began in March 2025 in North Carolina. Filming locations include Wilmington and Atlanta.

== Release ==
Driver's Ed premiered at the 2025 Toronto International Film Festival on September 12, 2025. In January 2026, Vertical acquired the distribution rights to the film, and released it theatrically and on digital on May 15, 2026.
