= The Runarounds (band) =

American rock band

- Origin: Wilmington, North Carolina
- Genres: Alternative rock; indie rock; pop rock; punk rock; art rock
- Years active: 2021–present
- Label: Arista Records
- Members: Axel Ellis; Jesse Golliher; William Lipton; Zendé Murdock
- Past members: Jeremy Yun
- Website: therunarounds.com

The Runarounds is an American indie rock band formed in Wilmington, North Carolina in 2021 by William Lipton (vocals, guitar), Axel Ellis (guitar, vocals), Jesse Golliher (bass, backing vocals), Former Member Jeremy Yun (lead guitar, backing vocals), and Zendé Murdock (drums). The band released an EPs titled The Runarounds Live at USC (2023) before the release of their Prime Video series, The Runarounds. In 2025, they released their debut album The Runarounds (Prime Video Original Series Soundtrack), which was released following the series.

== History ==
=== Formation, Prime Video series and The Mini Van tour (2021–2025) ===
The Runarounds formed in 2021 by Outer Banks creator Jonas Pate with Axel Ellis, Jesse Golliher, William Lipton, Zendé Murdock and Jeremy Yun. Lipton and Yun were the only two who knew each other before the formation of the band as they grew up together, performed together and were a package deal. Pate originally held a massive casting call to find a young, talented musical group to perform in Outer Banks. From 5,000 entries, he narrowed it down to the final five, Ellis, Golliher, Lipton, Murdock and Yun. When they played together for the first time, their musical chemistry was instant. Recognizing their raw talent, Pate decided to build an entire television show around them, allowing them to play fictionalized, meta versions of themselves. The band made a cameo appearance in the premiere episode for season three of Outer Banks as a party band.

Following the success of the television series, the band announced a headlining our titled "The Mini Van Tour. The tour started in the Fall of 2025 with 19 dates from September through October. All 19 shows eventually sold out. On November 15, 2025, the band released a new single titled "Chasing The Good Times".

=== The Minivan Tour continues and Yun's departure (2026–present) ===
The band continued their Mini Van tour in 2026 with 30 new dates planned. The second half of the tour began in Dallas, Texas on January 15, 2026, and expected to finally conclude in Nashville, Tennessee on March 1, 2026. However, on March 20, 2026, the band announced a third leg of their tour through April and June 2026. On May 9, 2026, Jeremy Yun announced his departure from the band to pursue a career outside of music. The band stated:

For brother Jer (Jay money, Jay Remy, Remy Boy), We'd like to express tremendous love and support, it’s been an honor and a pleasure sharing the stage together. As life evolves, so do paths, and he’s stepping into a new chapter pursuing a career outside of music. Wishing you nothing but the best in your new chapter and you will always have our love and support. We’re lucky to have had this adventure with ya man, couldn’t have imagined it being with anybody else. Come back and play a show with us sometime ;)

== Band members ==
Current

- Axel Ellis – lead vocals, guitar (2021–present)
- Jesse Golliher – bass guitar, backing vocals (2021–present)
- William Lipton – lead vocals, guitar (2021–present)
- Zendé Murdock – drums (2021–present)

Former

- Jeremy Yun – lead guitar (2021–2026)

== Discography ==
=== Studio albums ===
- The Runarounds (Prime Video Original Series Soundtrack) (2025)

=== EPs ===
- The Runarounds Live at USC (2023)

=== Singles ===
Title	Year	Album
"Senior Year"	2022	—N/a
"Senior Year"	2023	—N/a
"Funny How The Universe Works"	2025	The Runarounds (Prime Video Original Series Soundtrack)
"Senior Year"	2025	The Runarounds (Prime Video Original Series Soundtrack)
"Chasing The Good Times"	2025	—N/a
"Arrhythmia (I Hope You Stay)"	2026	—N/a
"Bleachers"	2026	—N/a

=== Music videos ===
Year	Song	Director(s)
2025	"Minivan"	Jonas Pate and Jeff Werner
2025	"Chasing The Good Times"	Dan Gilloly
2026	"Bleachers"	Brad Walker

== Awards and nominations ==
Year	Award	Category	Nominee/Work	Result	Ref
2026	Guild of Music Supervisors Awards	Best Song Written and/or Recorded for Television	"Ghosts"	Nominated	
