= The Crusades (2023 film) =

- Directed by: Leo Milano
- Written by: Jack Hussar; Shaun Early; Leo Milano
- Produced by: Brent Madison; Leo Milano
- Starring: Rudy Pankow; Khalil Everage; Ryan Ashton; Indiana Massara; Mike Starr; Nicholas Turturro
- Cinematography: Dillon Schneider
- Edited by: Brent McReynolds
- Music by: Kris Dirksen
- Production company: Bad Little Thing
- Distributed by: VMI Releasing
- Release date: July 7, 2023
- Running time: 102 minutes
- Country: United States
- Language: English

The Crusades is a 2023 American teen comedy-drama film written by Jack Hussar, Shaun Early and Leo Milano, directed by Milano and starring Rudy Pankow.

== Plot ==
Leo, Sean and Jack are three best friends who attend an all-boys Catholic school called Our Lady of the Crusades. The film begins with the boys training Jack for a fight with a deaf student at a rival school, St. Matthews. The fight, taking place at a baseball diamond, results in Jack getting beaten up badly. Before the fight can end, the police show up and the boys, as well as dozens of onlookers scatter. Leo hops on a bike with Sean riding on the back. As they are racing away from the scene of the crime, they run over the leg of Ryan, a girl from their sister school.

The next school day, Jack is called into the dean’s office to discuss what took place. He denies everything, and Dean Whitman has more important things to attend to. The dean announces to the school that there are discussions taking place about a possible merger with St. Matthews. Vince, Ryan’s boyfriend, is a student at St. Matthews and knows Leo and Sean broke Ryan’s leg fleeing from the fight. The boys try to figure out how they can navigate this possible merger and not get killed by Vince.

Leo has to navigate a high school crush for his Italian teacher, Ms. Kerpial, while ignoring advances from Ryan, who doesn’t know he broke her leg. Sean must balance his time with his girlfriend Jess while making sure his friends don’t get killed by Vince. Jack is seeking the attention of any girl who will take him seriously.

The boys try to hide out from Vince at a party, but he finds them. Sean abandons Jess to try to protect his friends. A pursuit ensues, and Vince and his gang, "The Wrecking Crew", catch the boys and beat them up. They are rescued by a retired neighbor, Mr. Podkowa, who they had previously taunted. Vince decides to tell all after getting caught. He reveals he was in a relationship with Ms. Kerpial, who gets arrested for child molestation. He also reveals to Ryan that Leo broke her leg. Jess and Sean break up. The boys are left single, but still have their friendship.

== Cast ==
- Rudy Pankow as Leo Grecco
- Khalil Everage as Sean
- Ryan Ashton as Jack Nozak
- Indiana Massara as Jess
- Ashley Nicole Williams as Ryan
- Anna Maiche as Ms. Kerpial
- Blaine Maye as Vince
- Greg Davis Jr. as Dean Whitman
- Nicholas Turturro as Coach Krieger
- Mike Starr as Mr. Podkowa
- Hope Quattrocki as Caitlyn
- Nicholas Turturro III as Evan
- Adam Shalzi as Riggs
- Juno Yang as Tony
- Peter Siewerth as Mr. Marshall

== Production ==
On June 10, 2021, it was announced that Pankow will star in the film. On June 29 that same year, it was announced that Everage and Massara joined the cast. Shot on the Northwest side of Chicago and surrounding suburbs where director Leo Milano grew up and attended school.

== Release ==
The film was released in theaters, on demand and digital on July 7, 2023.

== Reception ==
On review aggregator Rotten Tomatoes, the film holds a score of 22% based on nine reviews, with an average rating of 4.7/10. Brian Orndorf of Blu-ray.com said that "there are spirited moments in the picture, but the endeavor as a whole is uneven, lacking inspired goofiness and a deeper, more human feel for the characters."
