= Accidental Texan =

2023 film by Mark Lambert Bristol

- Theatrical release poster
- Directed by: Mark Lambert Bristol
- Screenplay by: Julie B. Denny
- Based on: Chocolate Lizards by Cole Thompson
- Produced by: Julie B. Denny; Melissa Kirkendall; Koen Wooten; Mark Bristol
- Starring: Thomas Haden Church; Rudy Pankow; Carrie-Anne Moss; Bruce Dern
- Cinematography: Matthew Wise
- Edited by: James K. Crouch
- Music by: Carl Thiel; Stephen Barber
- Distributed by: Roadside Attractions
- Release dates: April 29, 2023 (Dallas); March 8, 2024
- Running time: 104 minutes
- Country: United States
- Language: English
- Box office: $292,687

Accidental Texan (formerly titled Chocolate Lizards) is a 2023 American comedy-drama film directed by Mark Lambert Bristol, and starring Thomas Haden Church, Rudy Pankow, Carrie-Anne Moss and Bruce Dern. The is based on the 1999 novel Chocolate Lizards by Cole Thompson.

The film was released in the United States by Roadside Attractions on 8 March 2024.

== Plot ==
Erwin, a recent Harvard graduate and aspiring actor, is dismissed from his first film role after disrupting a shoot. Leaving the set, he travels through Texas but becomes stranded when his car breaks down in an oil-producing region. Lacking funds for repairs, he accepts temporary work from a local driller, Merle. As he becomes involved in the operation, Erwin learns that the drilling project is failing. Merle persuades him to pose as an oil expert in an attempt to stabilize the business, leading Erwin to rely on his acting skills outside the film industry.

== Cast ==
- Thomas Haden Church as Merle
- Rudy Pankow as Erwin Vandeveer
- Carrie-Anne Moss as Faye
- Bruce Dern as Scheermeyer
- Brad Leland as Max Dugan
- Julio Cesar Cedillo as Sheriff Nall

== Production ==
Principal photography began in Austin, Texas on October 13, 2021, and also took place that month in Bartlett, Texas.

== Release ==
The film premiered at the Dallas International Film Festival on April 29, 2023.

In January 2024, it was announced that Roadside Attractions acquired North American distribution rights to the film.

Accidental Texan was released theatrically on March 8, 2024.

== Reception ==
On the review aggregator website Rotten Tomatoes, 50% of 24 critics' reviews are positive, with an average rating of 5.3/10. Metacritic, which uses a weighted average, assigned the film a score of 51 out of 100, based on 4 critics, indicating "mixed or average" reviews.

Joe Leydon of Variety wrote: "The next time you hear someone complain that they sure don't make them like they used to, point them in the direction of Accidental Texan, an unapologetically old-fashioned feel-good dramedy that, with a few minor tweaks, could pass as a newly rediscovered family-friendly feature from the mid-1970s".
