= Girl Group (film) =

- Directed by: Rebel Wilson
- Written by: Rebel Wilson
- Produced by: Rebel Wilson; Matt Williams
- Starring: Rebel Wilson; Jennifer Coolidge; Randall Park; Nicole Scherzinger; Sheridan Smith; Sally Hawkins
- Cinematography: Tim Maurice-Jones
- Production companies: Live Nation Entertainment; Future Artists Entertainment; Camp Sugar Productions
- Release date: September 11, 2026 (TIFF)
- Countries: United States; United Kingdom; Australia
- Language: English

Girl Group is an upcoming comedy film directed, written, and produced by Rebel Wilson. Wilson stars alongside Jennifer Coolidge, Randall Park, Nicole Scherzinger, Sheridan Smith, and Sally Hawkins. A fictional girl group named Girlfriends will be played by Wilson, Ashley Roberts, Melanie Chisholm, and Shaznay Lewis.

== Cast ==
- Rebel Wilson as Tassie Young
- Randall Park
- Sheridan Smith
- Melanie Chisholm
- Nicole Scherzinger
- Jamie-Lee O'Donnell
- Shaznay Lewis
- Ashley Roberts
- Judi Love
- Guz Khan
- Chabely Ponce
- Daniela Couso
- Lilah Pate
- Mia Kaplan
- Bailey Stender
- Loren Gray
- Miracle Washington
- Ana Yi Puig
- Keith Duffy
- Chris Colfer
- Be chill
- Jolene Blalock
- Sally Hawkins
- Jennifer Coolidge
- Flavia Fazenda

== Production ==
In November 2019, Lionsgate acquired Seoul Girls, a K-pop comedy written by Rebel Wilson. Wilson was attached to star in and produce the film through her Camp Sugar banner, alongside Alison Owen and Debra Hayward of Monumental Pictures. The screenplay follows a Korean American high school student and her friends as they enter a global talent competition for the chance to open for the world’s biggest K-pop boy band. Along the way, they receive guidance from a former British girl-group member and an ex-K-pop trainee while trying to earn their place on an international stage.

In February 2020, Wilson said that her interest in K-pop reflected the Asian cultural influences she experienced growing up in Australia, which was also being considered as a filming location. She described Seoul Girls as a Pitch Perfect-style film about a diverse group of teenage girls, and said that her first screenplay aimed to expand opportunities and representation in terms of ethnicity, body type, and identity. By May 2023, Wilson shifted her attention to her feature directorial debut, The Deb, an Australian musical comedy adapted from the stage musical of the same name. Production was scheduled to begin in Australia in September 2023. Later in 2024, Wilson and several producers became involved in legal disputes over allegations of defamation and misconduct. Earlier that April, Owen had said that the project, by then titled Girl Group, remained on Monumental Pictures’ slate and would proceed "when Rebel has some time".

In 2025, Wilson was additionally attached as the director with Matt Williams of Future Artists Entertainment and Live Nation Entertainment joining in as a producer. Owen and Hayward dropped out. Wilson departed from the project’s original K-pop premise, reworking it into a broader pop-music comedy. The producers conducted a nationwide US search to cast the young performers playing the girl group Wilson's character would mentor. Principal photography began in the United Kingdom in September 2025, with Randall Park, Sheridan Smith, Jamie-Lee O'Donnell, Guz Khan, and Loren Gray announced among the cast. Ashley Roberts of the Pussycat Dolls, Mel C of the Spice Girls, and Shaznay Lewis of All Saints were cast as members of Wilson’s former girl group, Girlfriends. The following month, Jennifer Coolidge, Nicole Scherzinger, and Jolene Blalock joined the cast; Scherzinger’s casting reunited her with Roberts. Filming concluded that same month, with Smith confirmed as part of the girl band Girlfriends. In November 2025, Wilson announced the seven newcomers cast as Xplode, the film’s titular pop band: Bailey Stender, Chabely Ponce, Daniela Couso, Mia Kaplan, Miracle Washington, Ana Yi Puig, and Lilah Pate. That same month, Judi Love confirmed that she had joined the cast.

== Music ==
Wilson co-write several of the film’s songs with Alana Da Fonseca, who previously worked on the Pitch Perfect series.

== Release ==
The film premiered at the Toronto International Film Festival on September 11, 2026.

== Reception ==
On review aggregator Rotten Tomatoes, the film holds an approval rating of 31% based on 13 reviews, with an average rating of 4/10. Metacritic, which uses a weighted average, assigned the film a score of 21 out of 100, based on 6 critics, indicating "generally unfavorable reviews".
