= Frisco King =

Upcoming American crime comedy-drama television series

- Genre: Comedy drama; Crime drama
- Created by: Taylor Sheridan
- Based on: Tulsa King by Taylor Sheridan
- Starring: Samuel L. Jackson; Asa Germann; Kai Caster; Lilah Pate; Savanna Gann
- Country of origin: United States
- Original language: English

Production
- Executive producers: Taylor Sheridan; Sylvester Stallone; Samuel L. Jackson; David C. Glasser; Ronald Burkle; Bob Yari; David Hutkin; Michael Friedman; LaTanya Richardson Jackson; Christina Alexandra Voros; Keith Cox
- Production companies: 101 Studios; Bosque Ranch Productions; Balboa Productions; Paramount Television Studios

Original release
- Network: Paramount+

Related
- Tulsa King

Frisco King is an upcoming American crime comedy drama television series created by Taylor Sheridan for Paramount+. A spinoff of the series Tulsa King, it stars Samuel L. Jackson as Russell Lee Washington Jr. The series is scheduled to stream exclusively on Paramount+ on December 18, 2026.

== Premise ==
The series follows Russell Lee Washington Jr, a New Orleans gangster and mob hitman who, after refusing an order to kill Dwight "The General" Manfredi, relocates to the Dallas–Fort Worth suburb of Frisco, Texas, to build his own criminal enterprise.

He discovers a hustler's playground hidden beneath the polished surface of American suburbia, and recruits an ambitious protégé, a loyal driver, and a growing network of eccentric partners.

== Cast and characters ==
=== Main ===
- Samuel L. Jackson as Russell Lee Washington Jr., an ex-con and former New York mob hitman who defies an order to kill Dwight Manfredi and relocates to Frisco, Texas, to start his own criminal operation.
- Asa Germann as Teddy, a "sharp, savvy, entrepreneurial" college dropout who draws Washington's attention and becomes entwined in his schemes.
- Kai Caster as Keith, a polite valet at the Sandman Hotel who becomes involved with Washington's nascent crew.
- Lilah Pate as London, a locally famous cheerleader who is unafraid to leverage her looks and status when recruited by Washington.
- Savanna Gann as Avery, another cheerleader and London's friend who is also recruited into Washington's operation.

=== Recurring ===
- Tom Pecinka as Ryland, a seasoned, professional businessman but is, in reality, a bit of a party animal.
- Arturo Del Puerto as Hector, a smart, hard-working, ambitious landscaper working on an upscale property in Frisco, TX.

=== Special guests ===
- Sylvester Stallone as Dwight "The General" Manfredi, an old friend of Russell and boss of the Manfredi Family in Tulsa.

== Episodes ==
No.	Title	Directed by	Written by	Original release date
1	TBA	Christina Alexandra Voros	Taylor Sheridan	December 18, 2026
2	TBA	TBA	Taylor Sheridan	December 18, 2026
3	TBA	TBA	Taylor Sheridan	December 25, 2026
4	TBA	TBA	Taylor Sheridan	January 1, 2027
5	TBA	TBA	Taylor Sheridan	January 8, 2027
6	TBA	TBA	Taylor Sheridan	January 15, 2027
7	TBA	TBA	Taylor Sheridan	January 22, 2027
8	TBA	TBA	Taylor Sheridan	January 29, 2027

== Production ==
=== Background and connection to Tulsa King ===
Russell Lee Washington Jr. was introduced in Tulsa King as a hitman with a shared prison history with Dwight Manfredi, establishing the backstory that leads into the events of Frisco King. The spinoff continues Sheridan's strategy of building interconnected television universes, similar to the expansion of the Yellowstone franchise with 1883 and 1923 and the use of shared characters and locations across series.

=== Development ===
In December 2025, Paramount+ ordered Frisco King to series as a spinoff of Sheridan's crime drama Tulsa King, which stars Sylvester Stallone as New York mob capo Dwight "The General" Manfredi. The project was initially developed under the working title NOLA King, with early plans to set the story in New Orleans, before the series was reworked and retitled Frisco King to reflect its relocation to North Texas. The retooled concept centers on Washington's move to the Dallas–Fort Worth suburb of Frisco, aligning the show with Sheridan's broader practice of setting series in and around Texas.

Sheridan serves as creator and head writer, with Paramount Television Studios and 101 Studios producing for Paramount+. He is joined as executive producer by Stallone and Jackson, along with David C. Glasser, Ronald Burkle, Bob Yari, David Hutkin, LaTanya Richardson Jackson, Christina Alexandra Voros, Michael Friedman, and Keith Cox. Voros and Friedman directed four episodes each, with Voros directing the pilot.

=== Writing ===
It was reported in June 2025 that Dave Erickson would write and showrun the series. However in July, Erickson left the series due to scheduling conflicts. In December, Sheridan was announced as the sole writer for all eight episodes of the first season. Paramount+ positioned his exclusive authorship as a key selling point, emphasizing continuity of tone and storytelling with the flagship Tulsa King series.

=== Casting ===
Samuel L. Jackson was first confirmed to star in and executive-produce the spinoff, reprising his role as Russell Lee Washington Jr. from Tulsa King. In March 2026, it was announced that Asa Germann, Kai Caster, Lilah Pate, and Savanna Gann joined as series regulars. In July, it was announced that Tom Pecinka, Arturo Del Puerto joined the series in recurring roles.

=== Filming ===
Principal photography for Frisco King began in late March 2026 in North Texas. In early April, Fort Worth Star-Telegram reported that production was casting local background performers for filming in and around Fort Worth, reflecting the series' intention to use the region to represent the greater Dallas–Fort Worth area, including Frisco.

Local news outlets subsequently reported that filming was taking place in nearby suburbs such as Southlake, including sequences that led to temporary road closures. Entertainment outlets, including Collider and Screen Rant, published first-look images of Jackson in character on set, noting that the series had officially started production under its new title.

== Release ==
The official trailer for Frisco King, Taylor Sheridan's upcoming Tulsa King spinoff starring Samuel L. Jackson, has been released on November 19, 2026 by Paramount+, and has rapidly surpassed 3.6 million views on YouTube.

The series is set to premiere on December 18, 2026 with two episodes, followed by new episodes every Friday.
