= Carlacia Grant =

American actress

- Born: New Haven, Connecticut, U.S.
- Education: Florida State University (B.Sc)
- Occupation: Actress
- Years active: 2016–present
- Television: Outer Banks

Carlacia Grant is an American television actress. Known for playing Cleopatra Anderson in the series Outer Banks

== Early life ==
Grant was born in New Haven, Connecticut, and also lived for a time in Florida. She started acting at a summer camp production of Robert Louis Stevenson's Treasure Island when she was 13 years-old following a suggestion to try it from her grandmother.

== Career ==
She made her television debut playing Irene in the History Channel’s 2016 remake of Roots. She played Danielle Turner in OWN series Greenleaf series and Leesha in Game of Silence. She also appeared in a 2021 episode of The Resident.

In November 2020 she auditioned for Netflix teen mystery drama Outer Banks. The following year, she debuted in a recurring role as Bahamian Cleo Anderson on season two of the series. She reprised the role for season's three and four, promoted to be a series regular.

== Personal life ==
Grant's parents are from the Caribbean and she has Haitian heritage through her mother and Jamaican heritage from her father.

== Filmography ==
Year	Title	Role	Notes
2016	Roots	Irene	1 episode
2016	Game of Silence	Leesha	4 episodes
2016–2017	Greenleaf	Danielle Turner	8 episodes
2021	The Resident	Trinity	1 episode
2021	Apollyon	Janet	
2022	Bae Night: The Little Black Book	Kim	
2021–2026	Outer Banks	Cleo Anderson	Series regular
