= Monster Summer =

2024 film by David Henrie

- Theatrical release poster
- Directed by: David Henrie
- Written by: Cornelius Uliano; Bryan Schulz
- Produced by: Mark Fasano; James Henrie; John Blanford; Dan McDonough
- Starring: Mason Thames; Lorraine Bracco; Mel Gibson
- Cinematography: Larry Blanford
- Edited by: Robb Sullivan
- Music by: Frederik Wiedmann
- Production companies: Wyoming Buffalo Studios; Taco Gucci; J. Bird
- Distributed by: Pastime Pictures
- Release dates: September 24, 2024 (DGA Theater); October 4, 2024 (United States)
- Running time: 99 minutes
- Country: United States
- Language: English
- Box office: $1.3 million

Monster Summer is a 2024 American adventure horror film directed by David Henrie, written by Cornelius Uliano and Bryan Schulz, and starring Mason Thames, Lorraine Bracco and Mel Gibson.

Monster Summer premiered at the DGA Theater in Los Angeles on September 24, 2024, and was released in the United States on October 4, 2024, by Pastime Pictures. The film received mixed reviews from critics.

== Plot ==
In the summer of 1997 on Martha's Vineyard, aspiring teenage journalist Noah and his friends Sammy, Eugene, and Ben are looking forward to a carefree vacation. Noah lives with his widowed mother, Abby, who runs a local bed-and-breakfast. The island's tranquility is shattered when local children begin to vanish mysteriously, only to reappear the next day in a silent, catatonic state. When Ben is attacked in the ocean and left entirely spiritless—with a young witness claiming a cackling witch pulled him under—Noah decides to take the investigation into his own hands.

Noah's primary suspect becomes Miss Halverson, a mysterious elderly woman dressed in black who recently moved into his mother's boarding house. Unable to get the local authorities or the town newspaper editor to take him seriously, Noah seeks the help of Gene Carruthers, a curmudgeonly, retired police detective. Gene lives in isolation after his own family fell apart following the tragic kidnapping of his son years ago. Initially dismissive of Noah's fairy-tale theories and insisting he only believes in "real monsters," Gene reluctantly agrees to look into the case.

As the duo sneaks through the island's foggy woods and gathers evidence, Gene slowly realizes that the supernatural threat is undeniably real. They discover the witch's lair, finding harrowing clues such as a collection of missing children's shoes and evidence that the witch is feeding off the kids to steal their youth and life force. Noah, his remaining friends, and Gene team up for a climactic showdown against the ancient evil witch. Together, they manage to outsmart and defeat the witch, breaking her spell, restoring the affected children to normal, and saving their town. Gene Carruthers visits his wife and reconciles with her.

== Cast ==
- Mason Thames as Noah Reed
- Julian Lerner as Eugene Wexler
- Abby James Witherspoon as Sammy Devers
- Noah Cottrell as Ben Driskel
- Nora Zehetner as Abby Reed
- Patrick Renna as Umpire
- Lorraine Bracco as Miss Halverson
- Mel Gibson as Gene Carruthers
- Kevin James as Edgar Palmer
- Abrielle Cincotti as Emily
- Lilah Pate as Ellie

== Production ==
It was announced in November 2021 that Mel Gibson and Mason Thames were cast in the film Boys of Summer, directed by David Henrie and written by Cornelius Uliano and Bryan Schulz, and that principal photography was to begin in December 2021 in Wilmington, North Carolina. David Henrie's brother Lorenzo James Henrie worked on the film as an executive producer. In January 2022 it was revealed that Lorraine Bracco, Nora Zehetner, Julian Lerner, Abby James Witherspoon and Noah Cottrell were added to the cast, while Darren Moorman and Scott Pomeroy were added as executive producers.

Henrie described the film in a statement to TheWrap: "Historically, fairy tales used monsters to personify our deepest fears while empowering young people to overcome them. Now more than ever, we need narratives that inspire courage in the face of darkness. Boys of Summer is a throwback story that conjures up the magic and nostalgia of childhood as its heroes fight monsters old and new."

While Gibson was filming in Southport, North Carolina he was awarded the keys to the city by the Mayor who declared December 16 to be "Mel Gibson Day". It was reported that Kevin James and Patrick Renna were also in the area taking part in filming. In May 2024, Variety reported the film's title had been changed from Boys of Summer to Monster Summer.

== Release ==
Monster Summer premiered at the DGA Theater in Los Angeles on September 24, 2024. It was released in the United States on October 4, 2024.

== Reception ==
On the review aggregator website Rotten Tomatoes, 59% of 29 critics' reviews are positive, with an average rating of 5.9/10. Metacritic, which uses a weighted average, assigned the film a score of 54 out of 100, based on five critics, indicating "mixed or average" reviews.
