= Madison Bailey =

American actress (born 1999)

- Born: Madison Lilly Bailey; January 29, 1999 (age 27); Kernersville, North Carolina, U.S.
- Occupation: Actress
- Years active: 2015–present
- Height: 5 ft 8 in (173 cm)

Madison Lilly Bailey (born January 29, 1999) is an American actress. She is known for starring in the Netflix teen drama series Outer Banks (2020–2026).

== Early life ==
Bailey was born in Kernersville, North Carolina, and was raised in Kernersville by adoptive parents. She has six older siblings–three brothers and three sisters, five of whom were also adopted through foster care. She is of Mauritian and Italian descent and has openly talked about growing up in a predominantly white household and community. Her mother died in 2018; she and two of her sisters have a tattoo in her memory. Bailey attended East Forsyth High School in Kernersville.

== Career ==
Bailey originally wanted to be a singer, but transitioned to acting and modeling at age 15 after suffering stage fright while singing in front of people. She began her professional acting career in 2015, appearing in TV series Mr. Mercedes and Constantine. In 2018, she was cast as Wendy Hernandez, a teenage metahuman with the ability to control and manipulate the air, in the CW science fiction TV series Black Lightning, a role she played for two seasons.

Since 2020, she has portrayed Kiara "Kie" Carrera on the Netflix mystery drama Outer Banks.

== Personal life ==
Bailey was diagnosed with borderline personality disorder around the age of 18.

Bailey came out as pansexual in 2017. From 2020 to 2025, she was in a relationship with retired basketball player Mariah Linney. She enjoys doing her own makeup and has appeared in advertising campaigns for Fenty Beauty.

== Filmography ==
Film roles
Year	Title	Role	Notes
2017	Fist Fight	High Schooler	uncredited
2018	Bottle Girl	Jackie	
2020	Discarded Things	Daniella	
2020	Impractical Jokers: The Movie	Bowling Alley Girl	
2021	Supercool	Emily	
2024	The Painter	Sophia	
2024	Time Cut	Lucy Field	Also co-producer
2025	Maintenance Required	Izzy	

Television roles
Year	Title	Role	Notes
2015	Constantine	Caroline	Episode: "Waiting for the Man"
2015	Swamp Murders	Mary Hold Bear	Episode: "Missouri River Murder”
2017	Mr. Mercedes	Chloe	Episode: "Gods Who Fall"
2017	Murder Chose Me	Angela Henry	Episode “Deadliest Sin”
2018	Two Roads	Zoe	Episode: "Pilot"
2018–2019	Black Lightning	Wendy Hernandez	6 episodes
2019	Creepshow	Carla	Episode : "All Hallow's Eve/The Man in the Suitcase"
2020	Council of Dads	Jules	3 episodes
2020–2026	Outer Banks	Kiara "Kie" Carrera	Main role; 50 episodes
2021	American Horror Stories	Kelley	Episode: "Drive In"
TBA	Constance	Sasha	Television film
