= The Painter (2024 film) =

Film by Kiamni Ray Smith

- Theatrical poster
- Directed by: Kimani Ray Smith
- Written by: Brian Buccellato
- Produced by: Steven Paul
- Starring: Charlie Weber; Jon Voight; Marie Avgeropoulos; Madison Bailey
- Cinematography: Ryan Petey
- Edited by: Trevor Mirosh
- Music by: Rich Walters
- Production company: SP Media Group
- Distributed by: Republic Pictures
- Release date: January 5, 2024
- Running time: 97 minutes
- Country: United States
- Language: English

The Painter is a 2024 American action thriller film directed by Kimani Ray Smith and written by Brian Buccellato. It stars Charlie Weber, Jon Voight, Marie Avgeropoulos, and Madison Bailey.

The Painter was released in the United States on January 5, 2024.

== Plot ==
A retired CIA agent paints as a hobby. But his past has come back to haunt him, as a mysterious woman shows up. He must find the way to evade the incoming threat in forms of some trained op recruits.

== Cast ==
- Charlie Weber as Peter
- Jon Voight as Byrne
- Madison Bailey as Sophia
- Max Montesi as Ghost
- Marie Avgeropoulos as Naomi Piasecki
- Rryla McIntosh as Elena Maran
- Luisa D'Oliveira as Agent Kim
- Leah Gibson as Lucy
- Jason Gray-Stanford as Niles
- Stephen Lobo as anxious man

== Production ==
Principal photography took place in Vancouver from November 28 to December 20, 2022.

In late November 2023, it was reported that Republic Pictures had acquired the rights to The Painter, directed by Kimani Ray Smith from SP Media Group for Republic Pictures.

== Release ==
The Painter had a limited release in the United States on January 5, 2024. It was released on digital platforms on January 9.

== Reception ==
On the review aggregator website Rotten Tomatoes, 0% of 10 critics' reviews are positive, with an average rating of 3.6/10.

Dennis Harvey of Variety wrote, "The Painter never seems like more than a rote shoot-'em-up inadequately juiced by the kind of shocking revelations that are all contrived verbal explication".
