= Beats (2019 American film) =

2019 coming-of-age drama

- Promotional poster
- Directed by: Chris Robinson
- Written by: Miles Orion Feldsott
- Produced by: Robert Teitel; Christian Sarabia; Glendon Palmer
- Starring: Anthony Anderson; Khalil Everage
- Cinematography: Joshua Reis
- Edited by: David Blackburn
- Music by: Siddhartha Khosla
- Production companies: Global Road Entertainment; 51 Minds Entertainment; Endemol Shine North America
- Distributed by: Netflix
- Release date: June 19, 2019 (United States)
- Running time: 110 minutes
- Country: United States
- Language: English

Beats is a 2019 American coming-of-age-drama film directed by Chris Robinson and written by Miles Orion Feldsott. The film stars Anthony Anderson, Khalil Everage, Uzo Aduba, Emayatzy Corinealdi, Paul Walter Hauser, Dave East, Ashley Jackson, Evan J. Simpson, and Dreezy, and follows a reclusive, teenage music prodigy who forms an unlikely friendship with a struggling producer. United by their mutual love of hip-hop, they try to free each other from the demons of their past and break into the city's music scene. It was released onto Netflix on June 19, 2019, and received generally positive reviews from critics.

== Plot ==
In Chicago, single mother Carla Monroe has cooked dinner and sends her daughter, Kari, out to find her brother, August. The siblings become victims of a shooting and Kari dies. Eighteen months later, August has PTSD and anxiety attacks due to the incident and spends most of his time in his room. Carla goes to work every day and is overprotective of August. August pines for the girl of his dreams Niyah and watches from his window as his best friend Laz sell drugs.

School principal Vanessa, tells her staff that she is going to cut personnel if attendance does not improve. She hires her soon-to-be ex-husband, Romelo, as the school security guard and tasks him with trying to get August, who has not been to school for months, to return to class. Unaware of August's issues, Romelo scares him when he enters his bedroom after hearing August working on a piece of music. Romelo secretly befriends August and sees the boy as his ticket back to the hip-hop music scene and a way to keep his wife. The two begin to work on music together.

Romelo tells August he needs to find a reason to write music. August reflects on his feelings towards Niyah, but is torn as his friend Laz likes her too. August writes a song for Niyah and gives it to her to listen to. Romelo sets up a date and makes contact with his old music producer friends. Queen Cabrini sings the song at a street party and people react positively. Carla comes home from work to find August missing. She calls the police and Romelo is arrested.

August destroys all the music equipment in his room and runs away. August blames himself for his sister's death and feels that he is a burden on his mother. Romelo explains to August that he is just a boy and not everything is his fault. He confesses to August that he was using him too. The pair decide to do things differently and August starts back at school, being welcomed by Principal Vanessa and his new girlfriend Niyah.

== Cast ==
- Anthony Anderson as Romelo Reese
- Khalil Everage as August Monroe
- Uzo Aduba as Carla Monroe
- Emayatzy Corinealdi as Vanessa Robinson
- Paul Walter Hauser as Terrence
- Megan Sousa as Kari
- Evan J. Simpson as Lazarus 'Lanz'
- Ashley Jackson as Niyah
- Ahmad N. Ferguson as Boy in Blue
- Jeremy Phillips as Vern
- Ariana Burks as Leshea
- Skye Sparks as Elizabeth
- Michael David Hammond as Big Dude
- Dave East as Mister Ford
- Seandrea "Dreezy" Sledge as Queen Cabrini

== Production ==
In June 2018, it was announced that Beats would be directed by Chris Robinson from an original screenplay by Miles Orion Feldsotta, with Anthony Anderson and newcomer Khalil Everage starring. The film would include original music from Chicago-based artists, including Young Chop. Costumes were designed by Mercedes Cook.

Principal photography began in June 2018 in Chicago.

== Release ==
Beats was released on the streaming service Netflix on June 19, 2019.

== Reception ==
On review aggregator Rotten Tomatoes, the film holds an approval rating of 89% based on nine reviews, with an average rating of 6.9/10. The website's critics consensus reads: "Beats is an entertaining - if all too familiar - coming-of-age story that is elevated by Anthony Anderson's excellent performance."
