= Shannon Burke (writer) =

American novelist and screenwriter

- Born: September 11, 1966 (age 59); Wilmette, Illinois, U.S.
- Education: University of North Carolina at Chapel Hill
- Occupations: Novelist; screenwriter
- Children: 2
- Website: www.shannonburkewebsite.com/home.html

Shannon Burke (born September 11, 1966) is an American novelist and screenwriter.

== Biography ==
Burke was born in Wilmette, Illinois and studied at the University of North Carolina-Chapel Hill.

After graduating he became a paramedic for the New York City Fire Department. Burke used these experiences in his novels Safelight (2004) and Black Flies (2008).

Burke has published four novels: Safelight (2004), Black Flies (2008), Into the Savage Country (2015), and The Brother Years (2020). He also has been involved in various film and television projects, including work on the script for the film Syriana (2005), and he is the co-creator and executive producer of the Netflix series Outer Banks.

Burke lives in Knoxville, Tennessee with his two sons.

== Novels ==
- Safelight (2004) Random House, ISBN 978-0812971743
- Black Flies (2008) Soft Skull Press, ISBN 978-1593761912
- Into the Savage Country (2015) Pantheon, ISBN 978-0307908926
- The Brother Years (2020) Pantheon, ISBN 1524748641

== Critical reception ==
- Safelight, Burke's debut novel, is a love story involving a fencer with HIV and a paramedic who interacts with the world through photographs of his patients. Burke stated that he believed the novel was about “personal redemption.” The book was well received, with the New York Times' Julia Livshin calling the novel “a minimalist tour de force.” Daniel Menaker, ex-editor and chief of Random House, called Safelight one of "the most under-rated novels I've edited."
- Burke's second novel, Black Flies is about the trials and moral weathering of a paramedic. Burke himself was a paramedic in New York and used his experiences from that job for the novel. The book was noted for its realistic depiction of paramedics. In the New York Times, Liesl Schillinger called the novel “searing and morally resonant." Black Flies was a New York Times Notable book, was on the short list for numerous prizes, and won France's Prix de Mystere de la critique.
- Into the Savage Country, Burke's third novel, a historical adventure, was a departure in setting and tone from his previous two novels. In a post publication interview, Burke said he wanted to write an adventure novel like "Kidnapped" or "White Fang." The novel was memorable for its historical depiction of trappers in the 1820s and was generally well-received. It was a finalist for the Reading the West Book Award.
- The Brother Years is a coming of age novel, a roman a clef, based on Burke's childhood in suburban Chicago. It was published in August 2020.

== Awards ==
- 2008 – Believer Book Award – Finalist for Black Flies
- 2010 – International Dublin Literary Award – Longlist for Black Flies
- 2015 – Grand Prix de Littérature Policière – Runner Up for Black Flies
- 2015 – Prix Mystère de la critique – Winner for Black Flies
- 2015 – Reading the West Book Award – Shortlist for Into the Savage Country
- 2017 - Prix SNCF du Polar - Shortlist for "Black Flies"
