= Rudy Pankow =

American actor (born 1997)

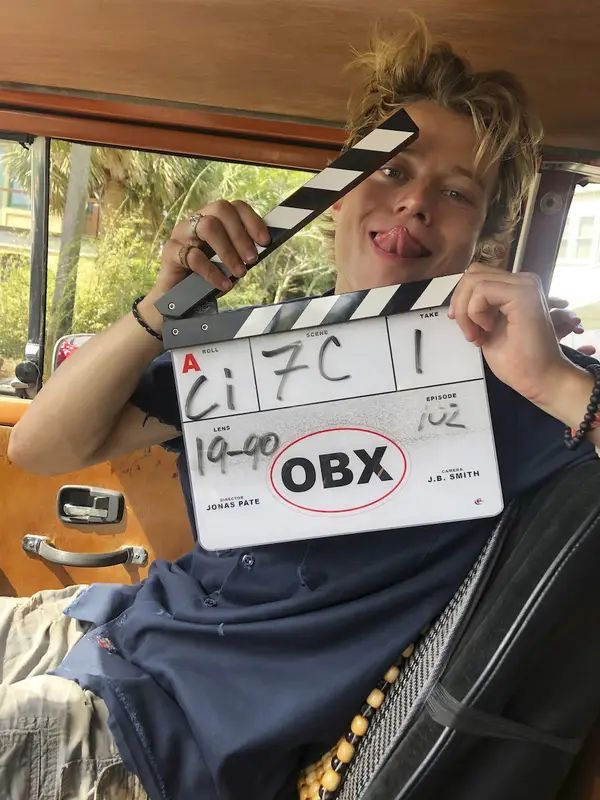
- Pankow on the set of Outer Banks in 2019
- Born: August 12, 1997 (age 29); Ketchikan, Alaska, U.S.
- Occupation: Actor
- Years active: 2016–present
- Notable work: Outer Banks
- Partner: Elaine Siemek (2020–present)

Rudy Pankow (/ˈpɑːnkoʊ/; born August 12, 1997) is an American actor. He is known for his role as JJ Maybank on the first four seasons of the Netflix teen drama series Outer Banks (2020–2024).

== Career ==
In 2020, Pankow began playing JJ Maybank on Netflix's mystery teen drama television series Outer Banks. The series is set in a community in the Outer Banks of North Carolina and follows the conflict between two groups of teenagers in search of a lost treasure. The show has been an international success for Netflix. In March 2023, Forbes magazine reported that all three seasons made Netflix's global top 10 weekly list, with season three attracting 99 million hours viewed, while the second and first seasons garnered 27.7 million hours and 34 million hours viewed, according to Netflix data.

In 2024, he starred as Romeo in the American Repertory Theatre’s Romeo and Juliet.

== Personal life ==
Since 2020, Pankow has been in a relationship with Elaine Siemek, who has also been working on Outer Banks since the start of its production.

== Filmography ==
Key
†	Denotes works that have not yet been released

=== Film ===
Year	Title	Role	Notes
2017	Do Good Things	Mike	Short film
2018	Deviant	Marcel	Short film
2022	Uncharted	Sam Drake	
2022	Space Waves	Joey	
2023	Accidental Texan	Erwin	
2023	The Crusades	Leo	
2024	5lbs of Pressure	Jimmy	
2026	Reminders of Him	Scotty Landry	
2026	Never Change!	Mark	
TBA	Thud †	Devil	Post-production

=== Television ===
Year	Title	Role	Notes
2017	Sunny Family Cult	Aaron	Episode: "Origins"
2019	The Politician	Other kid	Episode: "The Voter"
2019	Solved	Freddy / Robert	2 episodes
2020–2024	Outer Banks	JJ Maybank	Main role (seasons 1–4)
