= Outer Banks (TV series) =

2020 American teen drama television series created by Josh Pate

- Genre: Teen drama; Action-adventure; Mystery; Thriller
- Created by: Josh Pate; Jonas Pate; Shannon Burke
- Showrunners: Josh Pate; Jonas Pate; Shannon Burke
- Starring: Chase Stokes; Madelyn Cline; Madison Bailey; Jonathan Daviss; Rudy Pankow; Austin North; Charles Esten; Drew Starkey; Carlacia Grant; Fiona Palomo; Cullen Moss; J. Anthony Crane
- Music by: Fil Eisler
- Country of origin: United States
- Original language: English
- No. of seasons: 5
- No. of episodes: 50

Production
- Executive producers: Josh Pate; Jonas Pate; Shannon Burke
- Producer: Carole Sanders Peterman
- Cinematography: J.B. Smith; Gonzalo Amat; Itai Ne'eman; Bo Webb; Darren Genet; Derek E. Tindall
- Editors: Sunny Hodge; Christal Khatib; Jeffrey M. Werner; Kyle Bond; Scott J. Wallace; Blake Maniquis; John Peter Bernardo; Darrin Navarro; Shaheed Qaasim; Tim Quackenbush; Aaron D. Campbell; Nicole Vaskell; David Crabtree; Jennifer Macfarlane; Joshua Butler; Shawn Paper; Meredith Hicks
- Running time: 42–85 minutes
- Production companies: Rock Fish; Red Canoe Productions

Original release
- Network: Netflix
- Release: April 15, 2020 – August 20, 2026

Outer Banks, also known by the abbreviation OBX, is an American action-adventure mystery teen drama television series created by Josh Pate, Jonas Pate, and Shannon Burke for Netflix. The series premiered on April 15, 2020, and concluded on August 20, 2026, after five seasons consisting of 50 episodes. It features an ensemble cast starring Chase Stokes, Madelyn Cline, Madison Bailey, Jonathan Daviss, Rudy Pankow, Austin North, Charles Esten, Drew Starkey, Carlacia Grant, Fiona Palomo, Cullen Moss and J. Anthony Crane.

The series is set in a community in the Outer Banks of North Carolina and follows the conflict between two groups of teenagers in search of lost treasure.

== Premise ==
Outer Banks is set in a coastal town along the Outer Banks of North Carolina, where there is a stark social divide between the working-class locals and the wealthy seasonal residents, nicknamed the "Pogues" and "Kooks", respectively. The show follows a group of Pogue teenagers who live at The Cut and are determined to find out what happened to the missing father of the group's ringleader, John B. Along the way, they discover a legendary treasure that is tied to John B's father. Chased by the law and a wealthy group of Kooks from Figure Eight, the Pogues seek to overcome obstacles such as love, fighting, friendship, and money.

== Cast and characters ==
=== Main ===
- Chase Stokes as John B. Routledge, the ringleader of the Pogues, forms a romantic relationship with Sarah Cameron, early on in the first season. His father is missing, so he is determined to find the gold from the Royal Merchant that his father was determined to find before his disappearance. He manages to rope his friends and his girlfriend into the hunt for the gold.
- Madelyn Cline as Sarah Cameron, the daughter of Ward Cameron. She forms a romantic relationship with John B. Routledge early on in the first season. She is referred to by many as the princess of the Kooks; however, her rebellious side often rejects the Kook life and gets herself mixed up with the Pogues.
- Madison Bailey as Kiara "Kie" Carrera, the daughter of a successful restaurant owner who hangs out with the Pogues. She is technically a Kook as she comes from a wealthy family and lives in Figure Eight, but they reject her due to her affiliation with the Pogues. She becomes involved in a romantic relationship with one of her best friends, JJ Maybank.
- Jonathan Daviss as Pope Heyward, the brains of the Pogues. After Cleo joins the Pogues, Pope forms a close relationship with her which later leads to the two becoming involved in a romantic relationship.
- Rudy Pankow as JJ Maybank (seasons 1–4), John B's reckless, loyal best friend since the third grade who suffers abuse from his adoptive father, Luke. He becomes involved in a romantic relationship with one of his best friends, Kiara Carrera.
- Austin North as Topper Thornton, Sarah's ex-boyfriend and fellow Kook who despises the Pogues. As a part of the same friend group as Rafe, Topper is viewed as the nice guy.
- Charles Esten as Ward Cameron (seasons 1–3; guest season 5), Sarah, Rafe, and Wheezie's father, a wealthy business owner who lives on the wealthier part of the Outer Banks known as "Figure Eight"
- Drew Starkey as Rafe Cameron, Ward's son and Sarah and Wheezie's older brother, a drug addict with anger issues.
- Carlacia Grant as Cleo Anderson (seasons 3–5; recurring season 2), a crew member of Captain Terrance's cargo ship from Nassau who befriends Sarah and John B. After becoming a member of the Pogues, she forms a close relationship with Pope Heyward, which leads to the two becoming involved in a romantic relationship
- Fiona Palomo as Sofia (seasons 4–5; recurring season 3), a Pogue who wants to be a Kook and later Rafe's girlfriend
- Cullen Moss as Victor Shoupe (season 5; recurring seasons 1–4), a sketchy cop who tries to redeem himself by taking down Ward. Originally a deputy under Peterkin, following her death he becomes sheriff.
- J. Anthony Crane as Chandler Groff (season 5; recurring season 4), Wes' son-in-law and JJ's abusive biological father

=== Recurring ===
- Adina Porter as Sheriff Peterkin (season 1), the local sheriff of Kildare County
- Julia Antonelli as Wheezie Cameron (seasons 1–3, 5), Sarah and Rafe's younger sister who often helps Sarah out
- Caroline Arapoglou as Rose (seasons 1–3, 5), the Cameron siblings' stepmother and Ward's wife
- E. Roger Mitchell as Heyward, Pope's father and a local businessman
- CC Castillo as Lana Grubbs (season 1), the widow of a man named Scooter Grubbs who was killed during Hurricane Agatha
- Chelle Ramos as Deputy Plumb (seasons 1–2), a cop who works alongside Sheriff Peterkin and Deputy Shoupe
- Brian Stapf as Cruz (season 1), a treasure hunter
- Deion Smith as Kelce (seasons 1–2; guest seasons 3–5), Rafe and Topper's friend and fellow Kook
- Charles Halford as Big John (seasons 1, 3; guest season 2), John B's presumed dead father
- Marland Burke as Mike Carrera, Kie's father who used to be a Pogue but became a Kook due to his marriage with Kie's mother
- Nicholas Cirillo as Barry (seasons 1–3, 5; guest season 4), Rafe's drug dealer and the owner of a pawn shop
- Gary Weeks as Luke (season 1; guest seasons 2, 4–5), JJ's abusive drug addict and alcoholic adoptive father
- Samantha Soule as Anna Carrera (seasons 2–5; guest season 1), Kie's mother who worries about Kie's involvement with the Pogues
- Adam Donahue as Agent Bratcher (season 2; guest season 1), who is investigating the murders
- Terence Rosemore as Captain Terrance (seasons 2, 4; guest season 1), the captain of the cargo ship heading to Nassau who transports John B and Sarah when their boat is overturned. He later returns in season 4 using his boat to transport the Lupine Corsairs.
- Elizabeth Mitchell as Carla Limbrey (seasons 2–3), Ward's former associate in finding the Royal Merchant
- Jesse C. Boyd as Renfield (season 2), Limbrey's younger half-brother who helps her
- Mary Rachel Quinn as Dr. Thornton (season 3; guest seasons 1, 4–5), Topper's mother
- Tonia Jackson as Cara Heyward (season 3; guest seasons 1, 4–5), Pope's mother
- Andy McQueen as Carlos Singh (season 3), a ruthless Caribbean man who is obsessed with finding the El Dorado treasure
- Lou Ferrigno Jr. as Ryan (season 3), Carlos' right-hand man
- David Jensen as Wes Genrette (season 4; guest season 3), a mysterious wealthy old man who offered to pay the Pogues $50,000 to find an amulet
- Rigo Sanchez as Lightner (season 4), a mercenary of the Lupine Corsairs
- Jason Davis as Dale Zeasy (seasons 4–5), a real estate developer
- Mia Challis as Ruthie (seasons 4–5), Topper's girlfriend who hates the Pogues
- Brianna Brown as Hollis Robinson (season 4), a realtor in Kildare County
- Pollyanna McIntosh as Dalia (seasons 4–5), a high-ranking member of the Lupine Corsairs
- Connor Alexander as Deputy Benton (seasons 4–5)
- Jason Alan Carvell as Finch (season 5), the leader of the Lupine Corsairs
- David Bianchi as Julio (season 5), a drug kingpin
- Joshua Mikel as Tevi (season 5)
- Rob Mayes as Roberto (season 5)

== Episodes ==
| Season | Episodes | | Originally released |
|---|---|---|---|
| 1 | 10 | | April 15, 2020 |
| 2 | 10 | | July 30, 2021 |
| 3 | 10 | | February 23, 2023 |
| 4 | 10 | 5 | October 10, 2024 |
| 4 | 10 | 5 | November 7, 2024 |
| 5 | 10 | | August 20, 2026 |

=== Season 1 (2020) ===
| No. overall | No. in season | Title | Directed by | Written by | Original release date |
|---|---|---|---|---|---|
| 1 | 1 | "Pilot" | Jonas Pate | Teleplay by : Josh Pate & Shannon Burke; Story by : Josh Pate & Jonas Pate & Shannon Burke | April 15, 2020 |
John B Routledge, JJ Maybank, Pope Heyward, and Kiara Carrera are a group of friends (the "Pogues") who live on Kildare Island. John B's scheduled move to a foster home is postponed due to a hurricane. After the hurricane, the Pogues find a key to a motel room onboard a sunken ship in the marsh. The room safe has an envelope, a gun, and a large amount of cash. JJ grabs the gun and a handful of cash from the room. Later that night the Pogues go to a beach party and John B gets into a scuffle with Topper (one of the Pogues' rivals, part of the wealthy gang of Kooks). JJ threatens Topper with the gun from the motel room when Topper tries to drown John B. Later on, John B borrows scuba gear from his employer (Ward Cameron, father of "Kook princess" Sarah) so they can explore the wreck. While leaving the boat crash site they are chased and shot at by two other men in a boat, but Kiara sabotages the men's boat and they get away. When they arrive home they find John B's father's compass in a bag from the wreck.
| 2 | 2 | "The Lucky Compass" | Jonas Pate | Shannon Burke | April 15, 2020 |
Sarah catches John B returning the scuba gear and agrees not to tell Ward but her younger sister, Wheezie, overhears them and tells Topper, who tells Ward when Sarah acts cagey, causing Ward to fire John B. John B and JJ find Lana, Scooter's wife, being threatened by the two men who chased them off the boat. They try to help, but she tells them the compass is dangerous and asks them to leave. John B finds a clue inside it: "Redfield". The two men show up looking for the clues from the Merchant. The group gets away and goes to the Redfield lighthouse, where a man tells them where to find the Merchant but calls the cops on them when he sees the compass. JJ and Pope get away but John B and Kiara get caught and are bailed out by Kiara's dad. John B is chased by the two men again, but they leave when the sheriff shows up. He decides to give the compass to Sheriff Peterkin and finds out his great-grandmother's maiden name is Redfield. The Pogues drive out to her grave and Kiara finds something.
| 3 | 3 | "The Forbidden Zone" | Cherie Nowlan | Josh Pate | April 15, 2020 |
Kiara finds an envelope with a map of the Royal Merchant wreck and a tape recorder with John B's father telling John B to finish what he started. The Pogues plan to retrieve the treasure onboard the Merchant. Rafe makes a deal with Barry to sell drugs. The Pogues head to the salvage yard to get a drone with a camera to explore the wreck. Kiara distracts the guard, while the boys try to get the drone. JJ doesn't have the key code and the guard dog alerts the security guard, who chases them. JJ and Pope run away. John B gets the drone while JJ sweet-talks the guard into letting him go. Later, a fisherman finds the bodies of the two men who were chasing the compass and calls the cops. Rafe and Topper jump Pope; Pope and JJ retaliate by pulling the plug on Topper's boat. The group finds the ship at almost 1000 feet down.
| 4 | 4 | "Spy Games" | Cherie Nowlan | Jonas Pate | April 15, 2020 |
With no gold to be found in the wreck, the group head home. The DCS and the police show up to take John B to a foster home. He escapes, but loses his dad's picture and gets wounded; Sarah finds him, retrieves the picture and takes him to Tannyhill to patch up the wound. Topper finds his sunken boat and he, Rafe, and Kelce deduce that it was sunk by Pope. At Tannyhill, John B asks Sarah about a portrait on the wall of her father's office, which she reveals is a portrait of Denmark Tanny, creator of Tannyhill. John B recognizes the name and realizes that Denmark survived the wreck. Sarah accompanies John B to the archives to find out more about Denmark. JJ, Pope, and Kiara go to a movie and are confronted by Rafe, Topper, and Kelce; Kiara sets the movie screen on fire as a distraction so Rafe, Topper, and Kelce leave. Later, to protect Pope, JJ tells the police he sunk Topper's boat and is taken into custody.
| 5 | 5 | "Midsummers" | Jonas Pate | Josh Pate & Shannon Burke | April 15, 2020 |
Sheriff Peterkin tries to get JJ to bring John B in by offering to keep JJ out of juvenile prison but after his abusive father nearly kills him over the restitution JJ owes for Topper's boat, JJ runs away from home and helps John B evade the police squad Peterkin sent to the Routledge residence. Peterkin also knows about the Merchant thanks to a mystery benefactor who also has the compass, later revealed to be Ward. The Pogues crash the MidSummers party where John B tells Sarah to bring him a plat map of Tannyhill (where Denmark Tanny's letter, found in Big John Routledge's belongings, reveals the gold to be). Topper goes to Tannyhill to apologize for hounding Sarah about where she was the day before, but finds Wheezie in Sarah's room; pressured by Topper, Wheezie reveals where Sarah is. Topper shows up at Hawk's Nest to see John B and Sarah kissing and attacks John B, landing him in the hospital. Sarah tells Ward everything and Ward offers to be John B's legal guardian. John B accepts Ward's offer.
| 6 | 6 | "Parcel 9" | Jonas Pate | Teleplay by : Keith Josef Adkins and Kathleen Hale; Story by : Keith Josef Adkins | April 15, 2020 |
The Pogues deduce, thanks to Pope, that the gold is in an old well in the Crain house's basement; John B brings Sarah in to help. Sarah and Kiara have a massive fight and leave. After paying Rafe's drug dealer, Ward kicks Rafe out of the house for being irresponsible. Kiara reveals some of her history with Sarah to Pope. Peterkin finds Big John's glasses on the island Scooter was on during the storm and deduces that the deaths of Big John, Scooter and the two men who were pursuing the Pogues are connected. Sarah and Kiara work out their issues; at the Crain house, the girls deactivate the motion sensors; the boys go into the basement to retrieve the gold but the noise awakens Mrs. Crain. John B finds Mr. Crain's bones at the bottom of the well, but also finds the gold almost by accident. Mrs. Crain tries to attack Kiara, but Sarah pulls her to safety. The girls join the boys as Mrs. Crain breaks through the parlor door. Mrs. Crain tries to shoot the Pogues but they escape with a few bars of gold.
| 7 | 7 | "Dead Calm" | Valerie Weiss | Kathleen Hale | April 15, 2020 |
Ward overhears Sarah and John B talking about the gold and sabotages the Pogues' plan, insisting that John B go fishing with him. The Pogues try to pawn off the single gold nugget Kiara makes, but are ambushed by a drug dealer named Barry. The Pogues incapacitate Barry and regain the nugget. JJ steals Barry's cash stash and goes back home but it doesn't work out. JJ stands up to Luke and leaves, before spending the cash on a hot tub. When Pope and Kiara show up, JJ breaks down, revealing that he got the hot tub for the Pogues - his family. Sarah and John B have sex in his secret spot. On the fishing trip, while trying to get John B to partner with him to retrieve the gold, Ward reveals everything he knows, including "Redfield" - the last message from Big John before his disappearance. John B realizes Ward was involved in Big John's disappearance and turns the boat around, intending to turn Ward in to the police. The last scene indicates that Ward is about to attack John B.
| 8 | 8 | "The Runway" | Valerie Weiss | Rachel Sydney Alter | April 15, 2020 |
John B escapes ashore and visits Lana, who reveals that Ward stole Big John's map to the gold and left him for dead and Scooter found Big John's compass with his last message to John B. John B tries to tell Sarah; Ward gaslights Sarah into staying away from John B and also retrieves the gold from the Crain house. Pope and Kiara have a fight; Pope runs out of his interview the next morning when he realizes that Ward is leaving the island with the gold. Rafe also finds out that Ward and Sarah are taking a plane to The Bahamas. Lana finally reveals everything to Peterkin. The Pogues, Rafe, Peterkin and Ward (with Sarah in tow) all converge on the airstrip. Ward drags an unwilling Sarah into the plane with him. John B forces Ward to stop the plane. JJ, Pope, and Kiara leave when the cops show up; Peterkin tells Ward he's under arrest for the murder of Big John. When Ward resists, Peterkin draws a gun on him; Rafe shoots Peterkin.
| 9 | 9 | "The Bell Tower" | Jonas Pate | Dan Dworkin & Jay Beattie | April 15, 2020 |
In the aftermath of the sheriff's shooting, John B flees while Ward sends the plane carrying the gold to the Bahamas and attempts to save the sheriff with Deputy Shoupe's help. However, the sheriff dies and Ward blames the murder on John B to protect Rafe and locks up Sarah who escapes with her sister's help. As John B goes on the run, his friends attempt to protect him while the police lead a manhunt. The Pogues decide to steal JJ's father's Formula boat so that John B can flee the island while Rafe hunts him as well; Pope has his heart broken after confessing his love to Kiara. As John B evades the manhunt, he is trapped by Topper and Kelce, but briefly escapes; Topper then discovers Sarah and John B's hiding spot and alerts the police about their location. Topper later tricks the police to prove how much he still loves Sarah so John B and Sarah can get away after Rafe sets their hiding place on fire.
| 10 | 10 | "The Phantom" | Jonas Pate | Josh Pate & Shannon Burke | April 15, 2020 |
Ward and Rose plan to retrieve the gold. Police swarm the island. John B and Sarah stay in hiding; Ward intercepts Sarah when she tries to tell the cops, but she escapes. The Pogues steal the Phantom, JJ's father's boat, while John B returns home to retrieve the gold nugget and comes back in Shoupe's police car. Rafe and Barry attack the Pogues, but Pope and JJ overpowers them; Barry learns of Rafe's crime and implies he will blackmail Rafe. John B and Sarah flee on the Phantom as a tropical storm strikes, but are soon spotted. The authorities force them into the open sea. Ward tries to manipulate John B into bringing Sarah back. John B reveals Ward's actions to the cops, leading to Ward's arrest, but the Phantom capsizes in the storm, and John B and Sarah are presumed dead. As their friends mourn and Pope and Kiara start a relationship, John B and Sarah end up on a cargo ship; with the ship on its way to Nassau, they realize that they can get the gold back now.

=== Season 2 (2021) ===
| No. overall | No. in season | Title | Directed by | Written by | Original release date |
|---|---|---|---|---|---|
| 11 | 1 | "The Gold" | Jonas Pate | Josh Pate & Shannon Burke | July 30, 2021 |
The Pogues mourn John B and Sarah; the community mourns Peterkin. The cargo ship's captain, Terrance, tries to turn Sarah and John B in; they escape and alert the Pogues that they survived. Ward tells Shoupe to handle the Pogues as they push back on his narrative that John B killed Peterkin. John B tries and fails to get the gold from Ward's Bahamian house; Sarah goes after him but Terrance kidnaps her and sends a crew member, Cleo, for John B. In desperation, John B gives Terrance the gold nugget and talks him into a plan to steal the gold. JJ, Pope, and Kiara plan to clear John B's name; they find, threaten and wiretap Ward's pilot, Gavin. Gavin blackmails Ward with Rafe's gun; Ward tells Gavin to meet him as the Pogues listen in. Ward doesn't have enough money to pay off Gavin. A security alert on Ward's phone results in the Bahamian police showing up at his house and apprehending John B. The last scene shows John B waiting for the cops to show his face to Ward as Sarah watches in horror.
| 12 | 2 | "The Heist" | Jonas Pate | Josh Pate | July 30, 2021 |
Sarah distracts the cops; she and John B escape. Pope, JJ, and Kiara see Ward killing Gavin after they argue over the money; Rafe's gun falls in the sewer. Shoupe rubbishes the Pogues' story about Ward and Gavin. Sarah gets Terrance to agree to go after the gold again. Ward and Rafe dispose of Gavin's body and Rafe goes after the gun. Sarah tells Wheezie she's alive and Wheezie gets her the gold transport details. Cleo, who had apologized to Sarah when Terrance betrayed her and John B, warns her against trusting him. Kiara finds the gun and her, JJ, and Pope get it to Shoupe; Shoupe keeps it in his desk despite it leading to Ward. Ward and Rafe leave for The Bahamas. Ward buys Rafe's loyalty by showing him the gold. Sarah, John B, Terrance and Cleo separate Ward and Rafe from their security and ambush them in some cane fields. Sarah and John B take the gold, flee Ward's security and get stuck in the fields; Sarah finds out she has a bullet wound.
| 13 | 3 | "Prayers" | Jonas Pate | Josh Pate; Jonas Pate; Shannon Burke | July 30, 2021 |
Sarah and John B go to the doctor; Terrance and Cleo leave with the gold. Pope's scholarship's benefactor, C Limbrey, claims they can clear John B and might be related to the wreck's captain; Limbrey wants to meet Pope in Charleston. After the bullet extraction, Sarah flatlines but her pulse eventually returns. Rafe reveals he shot Sarah while meaning to shoot John B but doesn't care that it was her; Ward sends the cops after John B and Sarah again. When Sarah wakes up, they leave the doctor's but are chased by the cops, who've recovered the gold. John B accidentally hits Cleo with the car. Cleo reveals that the cops took the gold and possibly killed Terrance and his henchman Stubbs. Pope's dad's car breaks down on the way to Limbrey's. Rafe tells Ward he needs help. Cleo distracts the cops so John B and Sarah can escape on Ward's boat. John B and Sarah get pretend-married on the boat. The two groups of Pogues converge on Charleston.
| 14 | 4 | "Homecoming" | Jonas Pate | Shannon Burke | July 30, 2021 |
Carla Limbrey's slaveowning ancestors refused to let Denmark Tanny buy his wife and daughter's freedom. Denmark died trying to get his wife Cecilia's remains from the Limbrey house after the Limbreys set the hounds on her for trying to escape (Denmark's baby daughter survived). Limbrey wants a key from the wreck and plans to hold Pope hostage so she can get it as ransom (she also has a tape of Gavin admitting that Rafe killed Peterkin). JJ, Pope, and Kiara flee from her and reunite with John B and Sarah. Ward tells Rose Sarah is alive and Rafe shot her. Rose tells him to choose between Sarah and Rafe. Kelce sees the Pogues buying beer and tells Rafe. Rafe and Barry show up to kill the Pogues but they hide. Pope and Kiara have sex. At Tannyhill, Ward tells Sarah he won't choose between her and Rafe. Sarah tells him she'll testify against him and leaves. The cops (sent by Ward) capture John B and an officer brutally beats him "for Peterkin".
| 15 | 5 | "The Darkest Hour" | Valerie Weiss | Josh Pate & Shannon Burke | July 30, 2021 |
Ward bribes Deputy Plumb to have John B killed by another prisoner. Kiara's mom kicks her out. When Pope asks, his dad says his grandmother used to have the key Limbrey wants. JJ tells John B his plan to get him out. Rafe sees Sarah's messages to Wheezie and sends her a meeting place. JJ steals his cousin Ricky's ambulance. Pope finds the key at his Mee-Maw's old apartment. At the prison, a different patient enters JJ's ambulance. Rafe threatens Sarah and tries to drown her; Topper pulls Rafe off her, beats him up and threatens to kill him if he ever hurts Sarah again. Plumb's man on the inside tries to kill John B but John B calls for help. Alerted by JJ, Kiara and Pope show up and JJ leaves with them. Shoupe finds John B, who reiterates his innocence and tells him about the attempted murder. Shoupe's SBI colleague reveals that the gun Rafe used to kill Peterkin is enough to arrest Rafe. The SBI surround Tannyhill.
| 16 | 6 | "My Druthers" | Sunny Hodge | Josh Pate & Shannon Burke | July 30, 2021 |
John B is freed, but finds that Sarah is missing. Sarah returns with Topper, and she and John B have an argument. Pope and Kiara decide to just be friends. Limbrey's henchman, Renfield, attacks Pope's dad, who suggests Pope go visit his Mee-Maw about the key. Renfield is revealed to be Limbrey's half-brother. Rose sneaks Ward out of the house. JJ and John B make a plan. Pope's Mee-Maw reveals that Denmark and Cecilia are Pope's ancestors. Ward sends Rafe away, and he leaves with Barry. When Limbrey arrives, John B distracts her with his dad's old key and Pope exchanges it for the exculpatory tape. Barry leads the cops to Rafe, and they arrest him. The Pogues give the tape to the cops. Topper's grandfather, Judge Holden, signs the warrant for Ward's arrest. The cops corner Ward on his boat and the Pogues join them. Ward blows up the boat, seemingly committing suicide. Topper shows up and holds Sarah as she cries, while John B stands on the dock looking conflicted.
| 17 | 7 | "The Bonfire" | Darnell Martin | Josh Pate & Shannon Burke | July 30, 2021 |
In a recorded confession, Ward admits to killing Big John and Gavin. He owns up to Peterkin's murder, allowing Rafe to walk free. Sarah ends her pretend marriage to John B. Conflicted, she goes to stay with Topper. He invites her to the annual bonfire. A girl at school invites John B. The history teacher gives Pope Denmark Tanny's diary, which reveals the Cross of Santo Domingo (the artifact the key leads to) was on the Royal Merchant. Rafe and Rose learn that Ward didn't leave behind any records of the gold. Denmark's diary reveals Captain Limbrey of the Merchant stole the gold and the Cross from a Spanish vessel that was on fire and had called for help, leaving the Spaniards to die. Tensions erupt at the bonfire, John B punches Kelce, and a fight breaks out. After the bonfire, Renfield shows up at the Cut and takes the key from the Pogues. Limbrey shows up at Tannyhill asking to see the island room. When Sarah comes by later, the island room has been ransacked and everyone, including Wheezie, is missing.
| 18 | 8 | "The Cross" | Darnell Martin | Josh Pate & Shannon Burke | July 30, 2021 |
JJ and Pope deduce from Denmark's diary and his last words that the treasure is buried near a tree named Angel Oak, near the Freedman's Church Denmark built for the slaves he freed. At Angel Oak, the Pogues realize the true treasure is Cecilia's body; they lay a wreath on her casket and bury her again after Rafe, Renfield and Limbrey defiled her grave looking for the cross. An inscription on the Merchant's spyglass, hidden in the tree, reveals the cross is at the church. JJ and Kiara get her dad's truck so the Pogues can get to the church; Luke leaves Kildare for good and JJ says goodbye to his dad. At the church, Pope gets an idea when he sees wooden crosses above them through the spyglass. He uses a crowbar to reveal the cross under two hollow beams. Rafe and Renfield have followed the Pogues there. Wasps start stinging Pope and he falls on the cushions the Pogues have stacked under him. The Cross falls too.
| 19 | 9 | "Trapped" | Jonas Pate | Josh Pate & Shannon Burke | July 30, 2021 |
The Pogues leave to get help for Pope's allergic reaction; an epinephrine dose causes Pope to total their vehicle; at the church, they find that Renfield and Rafe took the cross. Tired of the Limbreys trying to steal his family legacy, Pope declares that he will go after the cross; the Pogues join him. An argument between Renfield and Limbrey results in him throwing her to the ground, her shooting him dead and Rafe leaving with the gold and the Cross. Rose tells Rafe something bigger is going on. Sarah attempts to sneak into Tannyhill but Rafe finds her and locks her up; Rose drugs her and they leave. Angered by Rafe having his cross, Pope pursues him; JJ and John B follow Rose. Rafe gets rid of Renfield's body; Pope fights him to a stalemate, calls Kiara and takes JJ's gun. JJ and John B see the Camerons board a boat named the Coastal Venture with the gold and the Cross (and Sarah as a hostage). Pope causes an explosion with JJ's gun; the Pogues hide in a container. Ward is revealed to be alive.
| 20 | 10 | "The Coastal Venture" | Jonas Pate | Josh Pate & Shannon Burke | July 30, 2021 |
Sarah argues with Ward and locks him in a room. Rafe checks for stowaways. Kiara finds a way out of the container. Cleo is on the ship; she fights Pope but agrees to trust him because of John B and Sarah. John B tells the Pogues that Ward is alive. Pope takes down Captain Eberhimi; he, JJ, Kiara, and Cleo lock everyone in the hull except Rafe. Sarah gets the lifeboat; JJ and Kiara help Pope lift the Cross. Eberhimi escapes and frees everyone. Ward escapes and tries to strangle Sarah; John B incapacitates him; he and Sarah jump off. Eberhimi throws JJ overboard; Kiara jumps off to save JJ. The crew members help Rafe recover the Cross by shooting at Pope, who jumps overboard with Cleo; they get on the lifeboat, followed by JJ and Kiara, who recovers consciousness; the Pogues leave, landing on a deserted island which they call "Poguelandia". The Sheriff's department investigates their disappearance. Limbrey meets Big John; he's alive and agrees to help her if she helps John B.

=== Season 3 (2023) ===
| No. overall | No. in season | Title | Directed by | Written by | Original release date |
|---|---|---|---|---|---|
| 21 | 1 | "Poguelandia" | Jonas Pate | Josh Pate & Shannon Burke | February 23, 2023 |
A month on, the Pogues are making do on their deserted island, now known as "Poguelandia", when what appears to be a savior of a plane notices them and comes to their rescue. Unbeknownst to them, the pilot is not who he appears to be and Kiara is kidnapped in the scuffle. Rafe, filling in Ward on his progress, works with Rose to find a buyer for the cross despite her hesitations with Rafe taking the lead. Meanwhile, Mrs. Limbrey meets with Big John Routledge, and he tells her that he has wanted to tell his son that he's been alive, but that it would put John B at risk. The remaining Pogues head out to search for Kiara and discover more ties to the Royal Merchant gold and the cross.
| 22 | 2 | "The Bells" | Jonas Pate | Josh Pate & Shannon Burke | February 23, 2023 |
Kiara discovers the identity of her captor - the mysterious Carlos Singh, who believes it is his destiny to uncover the treasure of El Dorado and requires the diary of Denmark Tanny. Whilst her friends race to free her, Kiara is torn when Rafe is revealed to also have been lured to Singh's estate and proposes an alliance so they can both escape. Big John uses the local church bells to draw John B to him. Kiara and Rafe escape together, but she ultimately betrays him after seeing his vicious nature, steals his boat and is reunited with her friends - minus John B, who has decided to follow the bells, praying his instincts are right and his father is alive.
| 23 | 3 | "Fathers and Sons" | Jonas Pate | Josh Pate & Shannon Burke | February 23, 2023 |
John B is astounded to find his father at the church, alive. Their reunion is short-lived, however, as Singh's men close in on them. The rest of the Pogues are forced to flee without John B after they come under fire from Singh's forces, but everyone heads to Kildare, OBX. The group is strained when a jealous Pope picks up on the romantic tension between JJ and Kiara, but a meaningful talk with Cleo helps him work through his feelings.
| 24 | 4 | "The Diary" | Darnell Martin | Josh Pate & Shannon Burke | February 23, 2023 |
Now back in the Outer Banks, coming home is easier for some than others. JJ finds out he has been evicted, Pope's promising education has been squandered and Sarah finds herself homeless. Meanwhile, John B helps his dad to look for clues to the location of El Dorado, but Big John's insistence on keeping the plans between them strains John B's relationship with the gang.
| 25 | 5 | "Heists" | Jonas Pate | Josh Pate & Shannon Burke | February 23, 2023 |
Rafe is furious when he discovers Ward wants to donate the gold cross to a museum as a gesture of goodwill. He returns to OBX and the Pogues decide to steal it back from him. The plan involves Pope and Cleo sneaking onto the crate train the cross is in, whilst JJ & Kiara disable the tracks ahead. Sarah convinces a reluctant Topper to assist them, however, they realize the cross onboard the train was actually a fake, much to Pope's dismay. It is revealed that Rafe actually melted the cross down, against his father's wishes, and intends to sell the pieces.
| 26 | 6 | "The Dark Forest" | Valerie Weiss | Teleplay by : Josh Pate & Shannon Burke; Story by : Rachel Sydney Alter & Nicholas Schutt | February 23, 2023 |
Big John's obsession with finding the treasure has caused John B to become secretive and distant from his friends and Sarah, who urges him to let her in. A stressed out John B snaps at her and Sarah leaves, hurt. JJ overhears Rafe and Barry discussing the now melted cross and rushes to tell Pope and Cleo. Pope, already upset about his failed education, is incensed to learn about the defilement of his family's cross. Sarah runs into Topper and he invites her to a party, where she reconnects with her old Kook friends and impulsively kisses Topper. Cleo finds Pope about to kill Rafe, but she stops him and he breaks down in her arms. John B and his father make progress in their search, but Big John is taken captive by Singh and they head to South America. Ward returns to the Outer Banks.
| 27 | 7 | "Happy Anniversary" | Gonzalo Amat | Teleplay by : Josh Pate & Shannon Burke; Story by : Crystal Garland & Joey Elkins | February 23, 2023 |
Sarah wakes up the following morning, next to Topper and regrets her actions. Ward visits Rafe telling him he knows he stole the cross, but Rafe asserts his dominance over his father and later Barry tells him Ward will always be a problem and that the only solution is for him to be killed. Ward later has a tense meeting with Sarah. JJ and John B find Neville, the last survivor of the expedition, and tells them that to live and get the gold they must pass a test and gives them directions to get to South America and save Big John. At an anniversary party for Kiara's parents, Sarah confesses to John B that she cheated on him with Topper. A heartbroken John B, when goaded by Topper, beats him up, in front of everyone. Pope and Cleo search Pope's family heirlooms for clues to Denmark Tanny and find an invaluable letter from Tanny to his daughter.
| 28 | 8 | "Tapping the Rudder" | Valerie Weiss | Josh Pate & Shannon Burke | February 23, 2023 |
Sarah begins to question who she really is and if she really loves John B. Ward, seeing Rafe's limitless ambition, separates him from Cameron Enterprises, they threaten each other and Rafe aims at Ward, but does not shoot him. Sarah visits Topper, who tells her to testify against John B, which she hesitantly accepts. John B and JJ see a drug dealer to take them to South America in exchange for handing over their drugs. Singh and Big John arrive in Orinoco, Venezuela. Sarah meets with her father, who asks for the jet so that John B can travel to South America before he is arrested. Rafe asks Barry to kill Ward. Sheriff Shoupe arrests John B. Kiara's parents tell her that she must go to boarding school because of the danger posed to her friends, especially JJ; Kiara refuses to go. Sarah tells Topper to hold off on his complaint so John B can go to South America. John B and Sarah reconcile just as Topper sets the house on fire.
| 29 | 9 | "Welcome to Kitty Hawk" | Jonas Pate | Josh Pate & Shannon Burke | February 23, 2023 |
Rafe warns Ward that if he doesn't leave, something very bad will happen to him. As the group prepares to leave, Kiara is forcibly taken to the boarding school. JJ asks the group for more time to go rescue Kiara; On the way the drug dealer comes to settle scores with him but JJ convinces them to let him go with the story of El Dorado. Rafe regrets wanting to kill his father, but Barry tells him that someone else is going to do it. Topper finds Sarah and the group on Ward's jet and gives the police their location. When Ward is about to be killed, Rafe arrives and saves him; Ward is identified by a person and prepares to flee. Sheriff Shoupe discovers that Ward is still alive and that John B is going to flee. Ward eventually flees on the plane with the group, without JJ and Kiara, as Shoupe arrives. JJ arrives at the boarding school, Kitty Hawk, where he meets Kiara again, they express their love with a kiss and escape with the help of Mike Barracuda, the drug dealer, with whom they go to South America. Singh and Big John approach the treasure.
| 30 | 10 | "Secret of the Gnomon" | Jonas Pate | Josh Pate & Shannon Burke | February 23, 2023 |
At Tres Rocas, John B and the group separate to find José and while searching for him, John B and Sarah find Big John and save him. John B, Sarah and Big John find José with Ward, who has paid for the trip, and leave with him. JJ, Kiara, Pope and Cleo are now together. Big John, John B and Sarah arrive in Solana and they successfully translate the statue and find the way to El Dorado; Singh finds them and they discover that Ward has betrayed them. A fight begins in which Big John is fatally wounded. Pope and Cleo declare their love for each other. In the cave, John B and Sarah enter end up finding El Dorado; Singh enters the cave. When John B and Sarah return, they encounter Singh, who dies trying to stop the entrance from exploding. When they escape, Ward tries to steal the gold, but ultimately sacrifices himself for Sarah and dies; Big John succumbs to his injuries and also dies. 18 months later, back in the Outer Banks, the group is recognized for the discovery of El Dorado. The group accepts another mission, that of Blackbeard's ship.

=== Season 4 (2024) ===
| No. overall | No. in season | Title | Directed by | Written by | Original release date |
|---|---|---|---|---|---|
Part 1
| 31 | 1 | "The Enduro" | Jonas Pate | Josh Pate & Shannon Burke | October 10, 2024 |
18 months before they are to be recognized for their discovery of El Dorado, the group takes the money from the gold obtained and buys JJ's land from the bank for 33% more than it was worth. They rebuild, add a fishing stand and dock, and set up a business, saving their last nugget of gold (~$20k) for property taxes. JJ takes it and bets on himself to win a dirt bike race. JJ and Rafe are neck and neck, but are eliminated just before the finish line. Topper wins the race. Pope tells the group that they have $13,000 in property taxes due in 7 days and no overhead. Archaeologists surveyed the cave and confirmed the existence of the City of Gold, written on the Sentinel and honor the group as heroes, which has them meet the man who tells them the story of Captain Blackbeard. In need of money, the group heads out in search of Blackbeard's treasure, meeting up with Chandler Groff at Blackstone.
| 32 | 2 | "Blackbeard" | Jonas Pate | Josh Pate & Shannon Burke | October 10, 2024 |
Now inside the house, the group meets Wes, who tells them about a curse from the ghost of Blackbeard's wife that has been killing his family for 300 years; Groff tells them that recovering an amulet would break the curse, which is on Blackbeard's last ship, The Adventure. Rafe continues to struggle over his father's death and meets Hollis Robinson. Pope goes to ask his uncle about the location of The Adventure, but gets no answer; JJ and John B get the location of a coast guard. The group is in danger of losing business. The group prepares to find The Adventure, with JJ and Kiara diving to it. JJ and Kiara reach the ship, where they encounter another person and a fight ensues; Kiara's oxygen is broken. At the same time, a boat approaches Pope and John B but they are not seen. JJ and Kiara manage to get to the surface with difficulty but with the amulet; they are rushed to the hospital due to decompression sickness. When they go to see Wes for answers, they are surprised to find Shoupe, as Wes has died.
| 33 | 3 | "The Lupine Corsairs" | Gonzalo Amat | Josh Pate & Shannon Burke | October 10, 2024 |
The man who attacked JJ and Kiara visits the hospital and is admitted to the ER for his spear wound. He and JJ lock eyes. JJ and Kiara break out of the hyperbaric chamber when the nurse doesn't let them out. JJ causes a distraction while Kiara grabs the attacker's file. Sarah and John B visit an Islamic center to ask for help reading the inscription on the amulet. The attendee reads what he can and says it is cursed and throws them out after John B says he is a direct descendant of Blackbeard. Pope overhears the attacker and a woman talking about The Snapper, the amulet "the piece", and "The Blue Crown." Sofia overhears Rafe saying he's not "living with a Pogue" and that he has "standards." Hurt, she seemingly decides she's going to take Hollis' offer of payment to nudge him into whatever deal she's trying to make with him.
| 34 | 4 | "The Swell" | Gonzalo Amat | Josh Pate & Shannon Burke | October 10, 2024 |
On the boat, Terrance tries to convince Cleo to give him the amulet so they will let her live. While the group goes surfing, Pope searches for answers about the amulet, first speaking to Professor Sunn and then going to a museum dedicated to Blackbeard. Back on the island, Lightner calls Pope, telling him that if he doesn't arrive soon he will kill Cleo; when he arrives a fight breaks out in which Terrance is killed and Lightner escapes with the amulet. Upon reaching the beach, John B and Topper have a tense conversation, although it ends on good terms. Tension eventually breaks out between the Pogues and the Kooks after Ruthie kills one of the turtles of the hatching of turtles and Kiara confronts Ruthie and berates the Kooks for their lack of empathy; JJ threatens to kill the Kooks. At the house, the group hides Terrance's body just as Shoupe arrives to talk to JJ about his actions on the beach. Pope tells them that he has found that the Half Moon Battery is in Charleston, where they are headed.
| 35 | 5 | "Albatross" | Jonas Pate | Josh Pate & Shannon Burke | October 10, 2024 |
John B and the other Pogues go to a church to find the map that tells them where the Blue Crown is. Pope and Sarah go underground to the crypt while John B and Cleo are the lookouts. The attacker and his boss (the Captain) use the amulet to enter the crypt from a fake grave. Pope and Sarah hide while the attacker and the Captain find the map to the Blue Crown. They leave through the grave and Pope and Sarah are trapped in the crypt, which is slowly flooding with water. Meanwhile, JJ finds a letter addressed to him and calls a friend. He learns that his father lived at his friend's house the whole time and did not go to South America. JJ and Luke run away from the police and Luke gives JJ some shocking news, which is that Luke is not JJ's biological father, but Chandler Groff. Groff and Hollis are partners; Holly promises Groff that it will be glorious.
Part 2
| 36 | 6 | "The Town Council" | Jonas Pate | Josh Pate & Shannon Burke | November 7, 2024 |
Luke tells JJ that he is the son of Larissa Genrette and Chandler Groff who was presumed dead along with his mother, but that Groff actually gave him to Luke to raise. JJ leaves confused and without letting his father finish; he tells Kiara the story and asks her not to tell the others. The Pogues talk about their concern about how to defend themselves without a lawyer. JJ and John B quote Pogues from the island while Sarah talks to Rafe, who tells her that they must recover the gold and Wheezie from Rose, but she does not accept because she does not trust him. At the town hall, they learn that the decision has already been voted and although John B tries to defend their property, it has no effect since Luke has betrayed JJ and his friends for the amnesty. After this, JJ beats up a policeman and starts to run away, unleashing a riot. JJ is eventually cornered and his friends try to get him to turn himself in, but he refuses as he "won't stop fighting those who have taken everything from him"; JJ runs away and Pope punches a police officer who was aiming at JJ and is arrested. Groff and Rafe close a deal just as JJ arrives to talk to Groff.
| 37 | 7 | "Mothers and Fathers" | Erica Dunton | Josh Pate & Shannon Burke | November 7, 2024 |
Groff denies to JJ that he is his father. Lightner and his gang arrive to capture Groff, forcing him and JJ to escape. As JJ prepares to flee the island without him, Groff confesses that he is his father; JJ and Groff are eventually captured. Pope is placed on probation and is forbidden from seeing his friends. Kiara mentions to John B that she knows where JJ might be and when she goes to call Sarah she sees that she has taken a pregnancy test, which came back positive. Groff tells JJ that after Larissa's death he didn't feel capable of raising him, but now wants to act as his father. Pope has to choose between joining the Marine Corps or going to prison. John B and the Pogues find JJ and Groff. Groff was once part of the enemy crew. When they are about to kill JJ and Groff, John B throws a first Molotov cocktail that accidentally hits their boat and a second that hits the enemy ship, allowing JJ and Groff to escape; John B helps JJ escape and in the process they steal the Blue Crown map.
| 38 | 8 | "Family Plot" | Erica Dunton | Josh Pate & Shannon Burke | November 7, 2024 |
The Pogues attempt to decipher the map when Groff arrives; Groff explains to the group the origin of the map, created by Murat the Younger, and that it can only be read with a special lens, found in Larissa's grave. Sarah reveals to John B that she is pregnant. When JJ and Groff obtain the lens, Groff locks JJ in the tomb and takes the lens. Groff then goes to Poguelandia to steal the map, but is discovered by Kiara; Kiara confronts him and Groff knocks her unconscious and leaves. Pope is about to join the Marines, but leaves at the last moment. John B and Sarah attempt to get married, but the courthouse is closed; the Kooks begin a chase after the Pogues and Pope rescues them. Groff returns for JJ and they go to Hollis' house; Groff and Hollis argue and Groff ends up killing her and taking the money. Later, in the middle of the sea, JJ and Groff argue; JJ accuses him of killing Larissa and Groff leaves on the ship, leaving JJ stranded at sea, who is rescued by the Pogues. Groff goes to the Lupine Corsairs' ship and gives them the scroll and the lens.
| 39 | 9 | "The Storm" | Jonas Pate | Teleplay by : Josh Pate & Shannon Burke; Story by : Crystal Garland & Joey Elkins | November 7, 2024 |
Groff reports Hollis missing and the police find her dead; JJ is blamed after Groff plants evidence. The police begin searching for JJ, though Shoupe suspects Groff and calls for an investigation. When the Pogues discover that JJ is wanted, they decide to go to Morocco to obtain the Blue Crown and stop Groff; they attempt to steal a ship capable of making the journey, but fail. Shoupe discovers Groff's criminal record. When Shoupe goes to arrest JJ, Rafe arrives and saves the Pogues; Shoupe lets them go in order to capture Groff. Before leaving, JJ knocks out Rafe and they tie him up on the ship. John B tells JJ that he is going to be a father, but JJ, drunk, tells him that he is not ready. The Pogues face a storm in the middle of the sea; Kiara frees Rafe so he does not drown. Sarah falls off the ship and JJ jumps in to save her, but they both apparently die. In Morocco, the group finds JJ and Sarah safe and sound; John B and JJ reconcile with a hug.
| 40 | 10 | "The Blue Crown" | Jonas Pate | Josh Pate & Shannon Burke | November 7, 2024 |
John B and Sarah reveal to the group that they are going to be parents. The Pogues arrive in Essaouira and after stealing food for Sarah, the police chases them and Rafe and the group split up. Rafe finds Groff at a hotel and saves him from getting killed by Lightner. The Pogues arrive at the dock and head to Terrance's boat; John B and Sarah learn they must go to Agapenta, JJ saves them from being shot and the group escapes. Groff tells Rafe about Sofia's betrayal and Rafe throws Groff into a well. The Pogues find Groff; JJ gives Groff a jug of water to help him survive, but does not rescue him. In Agapenta, the Lupine Corsairs attack Rafe and are about to kill him; Sarah shoots them and a manhunt begins for Rafe and the Pogues. Sarah tells Rafe the reason her father died and they reconcile; John B deciphers the map. Pope shoots and kills Lightner. JJ finds the Blue Crown. Groff, who has escaped from the pit, takes Kiara hostage. JJ gives him the Blue Crown in exchange for Kiara, but Groff murders JJ in revenge for abandoning him; JJ declares his love for Kiara before he dies. Groff prepares to flee to Lisbon with the Blue Crown and the group, especially Kiara, swear revenge on Groff for killing JJ.

=== Season 5 (2026) ===
| No. overall | No. in season | Title | Directed by | Written by | Original release date |
|---|---|---|---|---|---|
| 41 | 1 | "The Crossing" | Jonas Pate | Josh Pate & Shannon Burke | August 20, 2026 |
| 42 | 2 | "The Crown" | Jonas Pate | Josh Pate & Shannon Burke | August 20, 2026 |
| 43 | 3 | "The Square Grouper" | Jonas Pate | Josh Pate & Shannon Burke | August 20, 2026 |
After their recent failures, the Pogues hit an all-time low. They're all deported back to the Outer Banks, aside from Cleo who is sent back to the Bahamas, and blamed for the riot. Pope is sent to jail for a month and starts spending his time getting high while Kiara struggles with JJ's death and her parents' expectations. Poguelandia is demolished and the Pogues won't get their money back for months and no one wants to hire them. Having lost all of his money to Groff, Rafe is evicted while John B and Sarah become homeless. Sarah steals the keys to an empty house where they begin squatting. While crabbing one day, John B finds a bundle of weed and enlists Rafe's help to sell it to Barry. Topper approaches Rafe about selling Tannyhill to Dale. On Sarah's birthday, the Pogues hold a memorial for JJ before John B is threatened by Julio Valdez, the drug trafficker the bundle belongs to. Valdez gives him three days to produce either the weed or $70,000 or Valdez will come after Sarah. Groff continues his pursuit of the Blue Crown.
| 44 | 4 | "Inside Job" | Jonas Pate | Josh Pate & Shannon Burke | August 20, 2026 |
John B and Rafe are unable to get the bundle back from Barry who instead suggests robbing Topper. Kiara learns from Mr. Sunn that Denmark Tanny was interested in the Blue Crown which can supposedly resurrect the dead. Finch is revealed to be seeking to resurrect his dead daughter Sadie and is searching for a scytale that is supposed to act as a coded instruction manual. As Cleo prepares to return to Kildare, she is approached by Finch's men who are seeking the scytale. While Rafe distracts Topper at a charity golf tournament, John B breaks into Topper's house, inadvertently bringing along Pope who is revealed to be suffering from PTSD after killing Lightner. After several close calls, the two steal the money, only for Topper to come home. With the help of a distraction by Kiara, John B and Pope escape, but lose almost all of the money and are caught on a security camera. Sofia warns Rafe about Dale's shady business practices and expresses remorse for her betrayal. Sarah learns from Wheezie that she and Rose have returned to the island with Rose's new boyfriend, Chandler Groff.
| 45 | 5 | "The Scytale" | Lukas Ettlin | Josh Pate & Shannon Burke | August 20, 2026 |
Rose reveals that she is selling Tannyhill as a part of a plan to launder the Royal Merchant gold, blackmailing Rafe with a letter from Ward incriminating him in the murder of Sheriff Peterkin. After learning about Valdez, Sarah has John B enlist Shoupe's help to arrest him in a sting operation. However, Valdez's henchmen avoid arrest and discover that John B had helped set Valdez up. Believing that Groff has returned in search of an item connected to the crown, Kiara and Pope search the abandoned Blackstone manor and find a hidden museum of collected artifacts including a picture of a staff like Finch was asking about. Demp reveals that the staff is a scytale, an ancient form of cryptography that Groff believes contains the incantation needed to raise the dead with the crown which Groff wants to use to bring his wife back. Denmark Tanny bought the scytale which Sarah remembers seeing at her mother's house as a child. While John B and Sarah search for the scytale, Pope reunites with Cleo. John B and Sarah find an empty box with a note before they're attacked by Groff and Valdez's men.
| 46 | 6 | "The Big Easy" | Lukas Ettlin | Josh Pate & Shannon Burke | August 20, 2026 |
John B and Sarah narrowly escape from Groff and Valdez's men and head to New Orleans, believing from the note that Sarah's mother Ellie has the scytale. Groff is arrested, but Shoupe is forced to release him due to a lack of evidence. Rafe reconciles with a remorseful Sofia who reveals that Dale's strapped for cash and desperate. Valdez's men chase John B and Sarah, leading to a confrontation on the road. In New Orleans, they find Ellie who reveals that when she planned to take her children and leave, Ward framed her with drugs and forced Ellie to leave with nothing. Ellie lies that she sold the scytale years before, having been contacted by Finch about it. Valdez's men attack and nearly kill the three, but Dalia saves them and takes the scytale, leaving John B and Sarah alone on Finch's orders. Sarah suddenly collapses.
| 47 | 7 | "Bal des Sauvages" | Darren Genet | Teleplay by : Tom Garrigus & Crystal Garland; Story by : Josh Pate & Shannon Burke | August 20, 2026 |
Sarah is treated for dehydration and Ellie reveals that she and Ward had sold a bunch of drawings made by Denmark Tanny to Figure Eight real estate mogul Trent Wincloss, including of the scytale. With them, the Pogues could recreate the scytale and decipher it. Dale blackmails Pope's father with footage of Pope's break-in to force him to sell, leading to Pope attempting to assault him. The Pogues decide to infiltrate a masquerade ball held by Wincloss with Groff doing the same. During the party, Rose convinces Rafe to agree to Dale's deal, Pope awkwardly proposes to Cleo and Kiara cons Wincloss into showing her where he keeps the drawings. When Kiara isn't allowed to photograph them, Sarah is forced to sneak in and do it herself. Groff drugs Kiara, steals her phone with a copy of the pictures and throws her into the ocean. John B rescues her, but Kiara believes that she saw JJ in a near-death experience. At the same time, Finch prepares to use the crown to resurrect his daughter.
| 48 | 8 | "The Runway Part 2" | Darren Genet | Teleplay by : Jay Beattie & Joey Elkins; Story by : Josh Pate & Shannon Burke | August 20, 2026 |
Kiara reports Groff's attack to the police. Groff finds Ward's letter incriminating Rafe in Peterkin's murder and arranges for it to be delivered to Shoupe, making Rafe a fugitive. Rafe proposes to Sofia before Rose warns him, forcing Rafe to go on the run while Sofia is arrested for helping him. Using Tanny's drawings, the Pogues recreate the scytale. The scytale provides an incantation for using the crown at Lake Yas'm Be in Azerbaijan under the Perseids which is only two days away. Rose agrees to let the Pogues and Rafe use her plane to get to Azerbaijan, providing some of the gold to pay a pilot. However, Rafe stays behind after learning of Sofia's arrest while Cleo is captured providing a distraction for the Pogues' escape.
| 49 | 9 | "Arise, Arise" | Jonas Pate | Josh Pate & Shannon Burke | August 20, 2026 |
| 50 | 10 | "The Storm and What Came After" | Jonas Pate | Josh Pate & Shannon Burke | August 20, 2026 |
The Pogues return to the island amidst an evacuation due to Hurricane Cassandra. Rafe breaks Sofia out of jail and ends up in a chase with Shoupe, saving Shoupe's life after confessing to Peterkin's murder; Shoupe lets Rafe escape after he promises to never return. Learning from Rose about Groff's theft of the gold, the Pogues search for him, but Pope has to help his father evacuate, eventually leading to them nearly drowning. Kiara finds Groff fleeing with the gold aboard a stolen yacht and confronts Groff, killing him by tying Groff to the mast and dropping him into the ocean. Kiara is forced to dump the gold overboard, but is rescued by her friends. Rafe risks his life to light the lighthouse beacon to guide the Pogues to shore. In the aftermath of the hurricane, which devastates the island, Rafe and Sofia flee to South America while Dale is arrested after his illegal business practices are exposed. The Pogues finally recover the Royal Merchant gold two years after it was stolen from them. They are able to buy back and rebuild the island. With the gold, Pope secures Cleo's immigration status, proposes properly and they move into Tannyhill. Kiara buys back JJ's property, dedicates a bench in his name and follows her marine biology dreams. John B pays off his debt to Valdez and Sarah gives birth to their son who is named in honor of JJ. A year later, John B and Sarah are officially married surrounded by their friends and family.

== Production ==
=== Development ===
On May 3, 2019, it was announced that Netflix had given the production a series order for a first season consisting of ten episodes. The series was created and executive produced by Josh Pate, Jonas Pate, and Shannon Burke. On July 24, 2020, Netflix renewed the series for a second season. On December 7, 2021, Netflix renewed the series for a third season. On February 18, 2023, ahead of the third season premiere, Netflix renewed the series for a fourth season. On November 4, 2024, ahead of the fourth season part 2 premiere, Netflix renewed the series for a fifth and final season.

=== Casting ===
Alongside the initial series announcement, it was reported that Chase Stokes, Madelyn Cline, Madison Bailey, Jonathan Daviss, Rudy Pankow, Charles Esten, Austin North, and Drew Starkey were cast in starring roles. On July 2, 2019, Caroline Arapoglou joined the cast in a recurring role. On October 22, 2020, Elizabeth Mitchell was cast in a recurring role for the second season. On April 15, 2021, Carlacia Grant joined the cast in a recurring capacity for the second season. Upon the third season renewal, Grant was promoted to a series regular. On June 23, 2022, Andy McQueen, Fiona Palomo, and Lou Ferrigno Jr. were cast in undisclosed capacities for the third season. On July 5, 2022, Stokes' stand-in double, Alexander "AJ" Jennings, was killed in a hit-and-run accident near Charleston, South Carolina. On February 29, 2024, it was announced that Pollyanna McIntosh, J. Anthony Crane, Brianna Brown, Rigo Sanchez, and Mia Challis were cast in recurring roles for the series' fourth season. On June 20, 2025, Crane and Cullen Moss were promoted to series regulars for the fifth season.

=== Filming ===
Co-creator Jonas Pate envisioned filming in Wilmington, North Carolina, but Netflix opted not to film the show there because of the state's House Bill 2 legislation. Principal photography for the first season began on May 1, 2019, in Charleston, South Carolina –the hometown of lead actress Madelyn Cline – including James Island, Johns Island, Kiawah Island, Morris Island Lighthouse (interior), and Hunting Island Lighthouse (exterior). Filming for the second season began on August 31, 2020, and concluded on April 2, 2021. Filming for the third season began on February 15, 2022, and concluded on September 17, 2022. Filming for the fourth season began on June 17, 2023. Filming locations include greater Wilmington for the first time in the series' history. On the week of July 14, 2023, production was suspended due to the commencement of the 2023 SAG-AFTRA strike. The series later resumed production in North Carolina on November 20, 2023. In February 2024, the series filmed for a month in Morocco, including the cities of Essaouira and Ouarzazate. Filming for the fourth season concluded on June 20, 2024. Filming for the fifth and final season began on June 20, 2025. On October 22, 2025, it was reported that Jonas Pate allegedly screamed at a female production assistant and grabbed her by the shoulders on set while filming in Dubrovnik, Croatia, with Chase Stokes and Madelyn Cline intervening. Filming for the final season concluded on December 19, 2025, with cast members sharing emotional goodbyes on social media.

== Release ==
The first season of Outer Banks premiered on April 15, 2020. The second season premiered on July 30, 2021. The third season premiered on February 23, 2023. The fourth season premiered in two parts, with the first being released on October 10, 2024, and the second on November 7, 2024. The fifth and final season premiered on August 20, 2026.

== Reception ==
=== Critical response ===
Critical response of Outer Banks
| Season | Rotten Tomatoes | Metacritic |
|---|---|---|
| 1 | 77% (22 reviews) | 61 (9 reviews) |
| 2 | 86% (7 reviews) | —N/a |
| 3 | 56% (9 reviews) | 52 (4 reviews) |
| 4 | 100% (5 reviews) | —N/a |
| 5 | 100% (6 reviews) | —N/a |

Steve Greene of IndieWire gave the series' first season a B− and wrote a review saying, "Some of those later confrontations buckle under the weight of their plot connecting, but when Outer Banks dials its melodrama to its own sweet spot, there's enough fun to keep a story-hungry audience following along the trail." Reviewing the series for The Hollywood Reporter, Daniel Fienberg described the series' first season as "pretty people, pretty cinematography, pretty dumb" and said, "the show is positively littered with characters and plot threads that feel like they might have been relevant or even important in a 13-episode season or a YA novel that offered more breathing room."

Writing for The Ringer, Andrew Gruttadaro characterized the series as "coming for the fantasy corner", saying that despite being named after a real place, it "exists in a world of its own" and "brazenly flouts reality".

On Rotten Tomatoes, the first season holds an approval rating of 77% based on 22 reviews, with an average of rated reviews of 7/10. The website's critical consensus reads, "Outer Banks' over-the-top melodrama is balanced out by a strong sense of adventure that's bound to hook those looking to capture that summer feeling." On Metacritic, it has a weighted average score of 61 out of 100 based on 9 reviews, indicating "generally favorable reviews".

The second season has an 86% approval rating on Rotten Tomatoes, based on 7 reviews, with an average of rated reviews of 6.7/10.

On Rotten Tomatoes, the third season holds an approval rating of 56% based on 9 reviews, with an average of rated reviews of 4.1/10. Metacritic, which uses a weighted average, assigned a score of 52 out of 100 based on 4 critics, indicating "mixed or average" reviews.

The fourth season has a 100% approval rating on Rotten Tomatoes, based on 5 reviews, with an average of rated reviews of 7/10.

On Rotten Tomatoes, the fifth season holds an approval rating of 100% based on 6 reviews, with an of rated reviews of 7.3/10.

=== Audience viewership ===
For the week of August 2 to 8, 2021, Outer Banks was ranked number one in the Nielsen ratings U.S. streaming chart, who announced that the show had been viewed for a total of 2.1 billion minutes of its 20 episodes. For the following week, the series was ranked number one again in the Nielsen ratings U.S. streaming chart with a total of 1.16 billion total minutes of viewing for the 20 episodes.

=== Legal matter ===
On December 21, 2020, a North Carolina teacher and author named Kevin Wooten filed a lawsuit against Netflix and the creators of Outer Banks, claiming they stole the plot of his novel Pennywise: The Hunt For Blackbeard's Treasure!. Wooten had sought for ongoing royalties and damages payments. The lawsuit was ultimately dismissed by federal judge Timothy Batten the following year in favor of the Pate brothers and Burke. In a 25-page opinion, Batten noted that the plots of Wooten's novel and the series shared similarities with respect to the themes of shipwrecks and finding buried treasure but opined that the substantial differences in other aspects, such as the plot and characterization, meant that analyzing the plots of both works "at such a high level of abstraction would render every work involving a hunt for treasure susceptible to copyright infringement."

=== Awards and nominations ===
| Year | Award | Category | Nominee(s) | Result | Ref. |
|---|---|---|---|---|---|
| 2020 | People's Choice Awards | The Show of 2020 | Outer Banks | Nominated | |
| 2020 | People's Choice Awards | The Drama Show of 2020 | Outer Banks | Nominated | |
| 2020 | People's Choice Awards | The Bingeworthy Show of 2020 | Outer Banks | Won | |
| 2020 | People's Choice Awards | The Male TV Star of 2020 | Chase Stokes | Nominated | |
| 2020 | People's Choice Awards | The Drama TV Star of 2020 | Chase Stokes | Nominated | |
| 2021 | MTV Movie & TV Awards | Best Kiss | Chase Stokes and Madelyn Cline | Won | |
| 2023 | MTV Movie & TV Awards | Best Kick-Ass Cast | Outer Banks | Nominated | |
| 2023 | MTV Movie & TV Awards | Best Kiss | Madison Bailey and Rudy Pankow | Won | |

== Future ==
A prequel series set 20 years before Outer Banks was confirmed to be in development in August 2026 under the working title Kildare.

== Other media ==
On February 18, 2023, Netflix held a fan event called "Poguelandia" in Huntington Beach, California. Musical performances included: Khalid, Lil Baby, Alt-J, Elley Duhé, Surf Mesa, and The Nude Party. The Outer Banks starring cast: Chase Stokes, Madelyn Cline, Madison Bailey, Jonathan Daviss, Carlacia Grant, Rudy Pankow, Austin North, and Drew Starkey were in attendance.

In October 2024, Netflix announced and launched an Outer Banks collaboration with brands such as ASOS, Lottie London, Byrd, PacSun. These collaborations were used as promotional material for the show, and feature pieces inspired by, and worn by, the characters featured in Outer Banks.

On October 16, 2024, Netflix announced the second edition of "Poguelandia" to be held on November 2, 2024, in Santa Monica, California. The event is to include musical performances by Remi Wolf, Jungle, and GloRilla. Leading up to the event, cast members Chase Stokes, Madison Bailey, Jonathan Daviss, Carlacia Grant, Rudy Pankow, and Austin North were split up for an international promotional tour making stops in Salvador, Seattle, Chicago, Houston, Miami, and Toronto.
