= Rob Peace =

2024 American film written/directed by Chiwetel Ejiofor

- Theatrical release poster
- Directed by: Chiwetel Ejiofor
- Written by: Chiwetel Ejiofor
- Based on: The Short and Tragic Life of Robert Peace by Jeff Hobbs
- Produced by: Antoine Fuqua; Rebecca Hobbs; Jeffrey Soros; Simon Horsman; Andrea Calderwood; Kat Samick; Alex Kurtzman; Jenny Lumet
- Starring: Jay Will; Mary J. Blige; Chiwetel Ejiofor; Curtis Morlaye; Gbenga Akinnagbe; Michael Kelly; Mare Winningham; Camila Cabello
- Cinematography: Ksenia Sereda
- Edited by: Masahiro Hirakubo
- Music by: Jeff Russo
- Production companies: Republic Pictures; Los Angeles Media Fund; Hill District Media; 25 Stories; Participant; Sugar Peace Productions
- Distributed by: Republic Pictures
- Release dates: January 22, 2024 (Sundance); August 16, 2024 (United States)
- Running time: 119 minutes
- Country: United States
- Language: English
- Box office: $422,329

Rob Peace is a 2024 American biographical drama film written and directed by Chiwetel Ejiofor and starring Ejiofor, Camila Cabello, Jay Will, and Mary J. Blige. It is based on the 2014 biography The Short and Tragic Life of Robert Peace by Jeff Hobbs about Robert Peace.

The film premiered at the Sundance Film Festival on January 22, 2024, and was given a limited theatrical release in the United States on August 16, 2024, by Republic Pictures. It received a nomination at the NAACP Image Award for Outstanding Independent Motion Picture.

== Premise ==
Yale University graduate Rob Peace, known as Shaun at the time his father was arrested for crimes he may not have committed, turns to drug dealing in order to get his father out of jail while maintaining other activities.

== Plot ==
In 1987, 7-year-old DeShaun (Shaun) Douglas is living with his mother, Jackie, in a largely African American community in East Orange, New Jersey, when his father, Robert E. (Skeet) Douglas, a small-time marijuana dealer, is arrested for the murders of two women. Skeet maintains his innocence, but a jury finds him guilty three years later and he is sentenced to life in prison. Jackie decides Shaun should change his name to Rob Peace to avoid people associating him with Skeet, while at the same time retaining a link to his father’s first name.

A gifted student, Rob enters St. Benedict’s Preparatory School in nearby Newark in 1994. He gets top grades despite helping around the house, taking odd jobs, and working to get Skeet out of jail. In 1998, Rob finds a loophole, and a sympathetic judge decides that the delay before Skeet’s trial violated his right to a speedy trial. Skeet is released, but has to return to jail a few days later when the prosecution appeals the judge’s decision.

Rob is accepted at Yale University, and St. Benedict’s pays his tuition there. He excels as a science major. At Yale, Rob makes friends, both Black and White, despite some racist incidents, but hides the fact that his father is in prison. He works in a cafeteria to pay his expenses. Skeet pressures Rob to find a way to get him out. An impressed Professor Durham offers Rob work assisting graduate students in the laboratory. She allows him access to the facilities at any time and eventually offers to give him her recommendation for postgraduate studies.

After an appeal judge overturns the lower court’s decision to release Skeet and requires him to serve out the remainder of his sentence, Rob confides in his girlfriend, Naya, about Skeet being in prison. She insists that he should not consider himself responsible for his father’s situation and that he deserves to live his own life. In 2001, Skeet tells Rob he is dying of brain cancer. To buy experimental cancer medicine and pay a lawyer for Skeet, Rob, with the help of his high school friends Curtis and Tav, starts selling marijuana on campus, using equipment from the laboratory to make it more potent. As the business takes off, Naya expresses her dismay at Rob becoming a drug dealer; she points out that he cannot even be sure Skeet is innocent.

One morning, campus security searches Rob’s dorm room, but finds nothing. Professor Durham convinces the University’s administration to let him graduate, although she withdraws her recommendation, which will prevent Rob from getting into postgraduate studies anytime soon. Naya tells Rob that after graduation, she will be leaving for Rio de Janeiro to work with her mother. Rob confronts Skeet in hospital, asking him whether he killed the women, but Skeet, upset to learn that Rob doubts his innocence, refuses to answer. Several years after Skeet dies, some old friends of his tell Rob that the prosecution’s evidence about the murder weapon was fabricated and that the police intimidated them into remaining silent.

In 2004, Rob, together with Curtis and Tav, starts up a project to improve East Orange by buying, renovating and selling abandoned houses. Their business is very successful, but falls apart when the subprime mortgage crisis hits in 2008 and the banks call in their loans. Tav is devastated, as he invested everything he had in the venture and now has nothing to provide for his family. Rob comes up with a scheme of buying and converting marijuana and selling it on the streets to pay their debts, but they will have to do it secretly without being detected by local gangs. As soon as he can, Rob pays Tav back and tells him he is out. After that, one of their dealers, captured by a gang, leads the gang to them, and Rob is shot and killed, although Curtis escapes.

== Cast ==
- Jay Will as Rob Peace
- Chiwetel Ejiofor as Skeet, Peace's father
- Mary J. Blige as Jackie, Peace's mother
- Camila Cabello as Naya
- Michael Kelly as Father Edwin Leahy
- Curtis Morlaye as Tavarus Heston
- Benjamin Papac as Jeff Hobbs, Peace's friend and roommate

== Production ==
In January 2019, it was announced that Ejiofor would direct the film (after Antoine Fuqua and his wife Lela saw his directorial debut, The Boy Who Harnessed the Wind). In February 2020, it was announced that Stephan James would play Peace and Ejiofor would play Peace's father.

In January 2023, it was announced that Jay Will would replace James as Peace. In February 2023, it was announced that Mary J. Blige was cast as Peace's mother, Jackie. Blige also serves as the executive producer of the film. Later in February 2023, it was announced that Camila Cabello was also cast in the film.

Filming occurred in Newark, New Jersey, particularly at St. Benedict's Preparatory School, in December 2022.

== Release ==
The film premiered at the Sundance Film Festival on January 22, 2024. In May 2024, Republic Pictures, which is also handling worldwide sales, acquired North American distribution rights to the film, scheduling it for a limited theatrical release in the United States across 500 theaters on August 16, 2024. The film began streaming on Netflix on November 11, 2024.

== Reception ==
On the review aggregator website Rotten Tomatoes, 75% of 52 critics' reviews are positive, with an average rating of 6.4/10. The website's consensus reads: "Chiwetel Ejiofor acquits himself well as a writer-director with Rob Peace, a solid and steady drama that enlivens standard clichés with compelling performances." Metacritic, which uses a weighted average, assigned the film a score of 61 out of 100, based on 15 critics, indicating "generally favorable" reviews.
