= Charles Cawley =

American businessman (1940–2015)

Charles M. Cawley
- Born: August 15, 1940; Beverly, Massachusetts, U.S.
- Died: November 18, 2015 (aged 75); Camden, Maine, U.S.
- Education: Saint Benedict's Preparatory School; Georgetown University
- Occupation: Financial services executive
- Years active: 1963–2003
- Known for: Founder of MBNA
- Spouse: Julie Murphy

Charles Michael Cawley (August 15, 1940 – November 18, 2015) was a businessman and founding member of the bank MBNA. Born in Massachusetts, he was raised in New Jersey, was educated at Saint Benedict's Preparatory School and was a graduate of Georgetown University. He created MBNA in 1982, and it was acquired by Bank of America in 2006.

== MBNA bank ==
In 1982, Cawley and a small team started what was then called the Maryland Bank National Association, spun off from Maryland National Bank and operating out of a converted A&P supermarket in Ogletown, Delaware. The next year, Cawley began upon the concept of affinity credit cards when he persuaded the Georgetown University alumni association to sponsor a credit card for its members.

MBNA went public in January 1991. Cawley focused on the operations side of the company while Alfred Lerner, the chairman and CEO, managed the company's finances. In 1997, the company hired Kroll, Inc. as an outside investigator to investigate work paid for by the company at two of Cawley's homes, which included the construction of a 16-car garage to showcase some of his classic cars, but ultimately reported no wrongdoing.

Friction started a board of directors' meeting in January 2002, when the board, aware of the recent corporate scandals over executive compensation, rejected Cawley's suggestions regarding compensation. That October, Cawley was promoted to chief executive following Lerner's death, but by November, Cawley was so frustrated with the board's rejection of his demands that he decided to retire.

== Post-MBNA ==
Cawley was honored with a Doctor of Humane Letters by the University of Maine for his efforts in establishing the Northeast Regional Marketing Center in Camden, Maine in the early 1990s. This marked a tie to Cawley's past, as his grandfather had once operated dress factories in Camden and nearby Belfast. Cawley was also familiar with the Camden area because he had spent summers nearby at his family's Lincolnville Beach estate.

Cawley was inducted into the Junior Achievement U.S. Business Hall of Fame in 2005. He died at his home in Camden, Maine on November 18, 2015, at the age of 75.

== Politics ==
Cawley made political donations to Joe Biden, George H. W. Bush and George W. Bush.

== Philanthropy ==
Cawley is mentioned in The Short and Tragic Life of Robert Peace as a significant donor to Cawley's alma mater, Saint Benedict's Preparatory School. He was so taken by Peace at an awards dinner during Peace's senior year at the school that Cawley paid for Peace's tuition to Yale, where Peace had been accepted.
