= Johnny Allen (coach) =

American athletics coach (born 1935 or 1936)

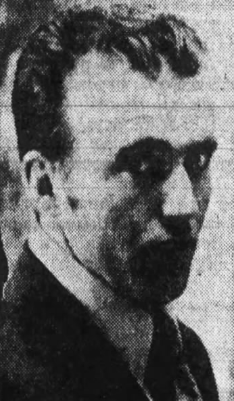
- Allen in 1975

Biographical details
- Born: c. 1935 or 1936 (age 90–91); Newark, New Jersey, U.S.
- Education: Seton Hall University (1958)

Playing career

Baseball
- 1955–1958: Seton Hall
- Positions: Pitcher, second baseman

Coaching career (HC unless noted)

Football
- 1956–1957: St. Benedict's Prep (NJ) (assistant)
- 1959–1965: St. Benedict's Prep (NJ) (freshmen)
- 1966–1970: Vailsburg HS (NJ)
- 1973–1974: Kean (backfield)
- 1975–1976: Kean
- 1978–1982: Essex Catholic HS (NJ)
- 1983–1986: Belleville HS (NJ)
- 1987: Summit HS (NJ)
- 1988–1991?: Seton Hall Prep (NJ)

Baseball
- 1959: Weehawken HS (NJ)
- 1960–1966: St. Benedict's Prep (NJ)
- 1967–1971: Vailsburg HS (NJ)
- 1974–1983: Essex Catholic HS (NJ)

Wrestling
- 1956–1958: St. Benedict's Prep (NJ) (assistant)
- 1958–1959: Weehawken HS (NJ)
- 1959–1966: St. Benedict's Prep (NJ)
- 1966–1970: Vailsburg HS (NJ)
- 1970–1973: Seton Hall
- 1973–1983: Essex Catholic HS (NJ)
- 1983–1987: Belleville HS (NJ)
- 1987–1988: Summit HS (NJ)
- 1988–1992?: Seton Hall Prep (NJ)

Head coaching record
- Overall: 8–11–1 (college football)

Accomplishments and honors

Awards
- National Wrestling Hall of Fame (2005)

John Allen (born c. 1935 or 1936) is an American former college and high school athletics coach. He was the head football coach for Kean College of New Jersey—since renamed as Kean University—from 1975 to 1976 and the head wrestling coach for Seton Hall University from 1970 to 1973. He was a longtime high school football, baseball, and wrestling coach throughout New Jersey from the 1950s until the 1990s.

== Biography ==
Allen was born in Newark, New Jersey, and was a three-sport athlete in football, baseball, and wrestling for St. Benedict's Preparatory School. In 1955, he accepted a baseball scholarship as a pitcher for Seton Hall. A shoulder injury forced him to transition to second base.

Allen began his coaching career as a sophomore in college as an assistant football and wrestling coach for his alma mater, St. Benedict's Prep. Upon graduating from Seton Hall, he was hired as the head baseball and wrestling coach for Weehawken High School. After one season, he returned to St. Benedict's Prep as the freshmen football coach and head baseball and wrestling coach.

In 1966, Allen accepted the same positions at Vailsburg High School. He resigned from the school in 1971 and accepted the head wrestling position for Seton Hall. He coached there for three seasons before going to Kean as the football team's backfield coach. At the same time he also coached Essex Catholic High School's baseball and wrestling team. In 1975, he was promoted to head coach for the Kean football team following the resignation of Ron San Fillipo. Allen resigned from Kean after the 1976 season when athletic director Hawley Waterman wanted a full-time football coach, as Allen was only in the position part-time.

After a year-long hiatus from coaching football, Allen was named head football coach, alongside his other two previous positions, at Essex Catholic. In 1983, he accepted the head football and wrestling position for Belleville High School. In 1987, he was hired for the same roles at Summit High School. After one season he again was hired for the position of head football and wrestling coach for Seton Hall Preparatory School. He held the position into the 1990s.

== Head coaching record ==
=== College football ===
Year	Team	Overall	Conference	Standing	Bowl/playoffs
Kean Squires (New Jersey Athletic Conference) (1975–1976)
1975	Kean	3–7	2–3	4th	
1976	Kean	5–4–1	2–2–1	T–3rd	
Kean:		8–11–1	4–5–1		
Total:		8–11–1			
