= Peter Carlesimo =

Peter Carlesimo may refer to:

- Peter A. Carlesimo (1915–2003), American football player, coach and college athletics administrator
- P. J. Carlesimo (born 1949), American basketball coach
