= Newark Abbey =

Benedictine monastery in Newark, New Jersey

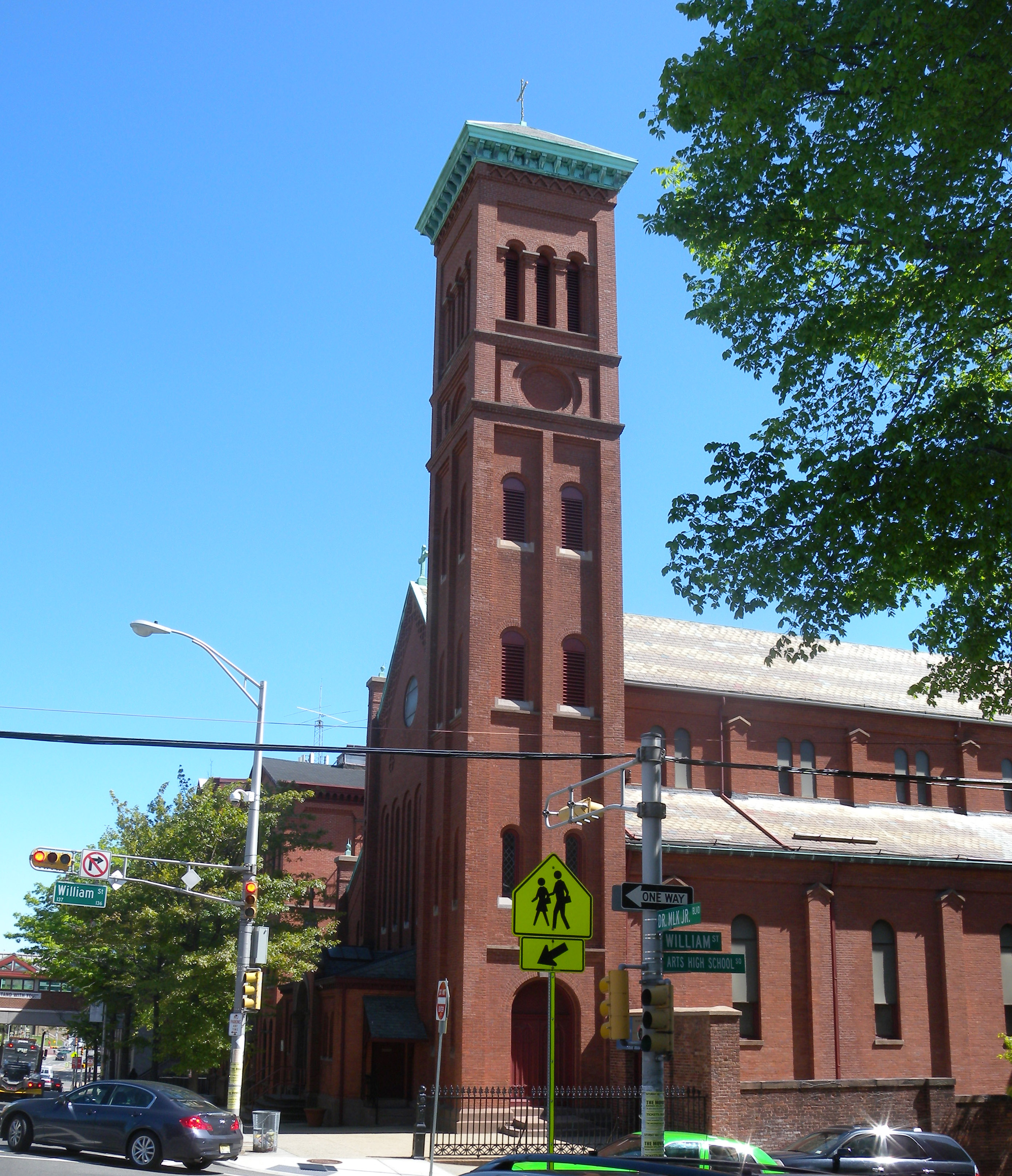

- Location within New Jersey

Monastery information
- Order: Benedictine
- Denomination: Latin Catholic
- Established: 1857
- Mother house: Saint Vincent Archabbey
- Diocese: Archdiocese of Newark

People
- Abbot: Rt. Rev. Augustine J. Curley, O.S.B.
- Prior: Rev. Edwin Leahy, O.S.B.
- Archbishop: Most. Rev. Joseph W. Tobin, CSsR

Site
- Location: 520 Dr. Martin Luther King, Jr. Blvd Newark, NJ
- Coordinates: 40.735509°N 74.180007°W
- Website: www.newarkabbey.org

Newark Abbey, officially incorporated as The Benedictine Abbey of Newark, is a Benedictine monastery located in Newark, New Jersey. It is one of only several urban Catholic monasteries in the country. The monks serve the community through Saint Benedict's Preparatory School and St. Mary's Abbey Church, which are situated on the Abbey grounds. As of 2024, the community is composed of fourteen monks, including ten priests.

== History ==
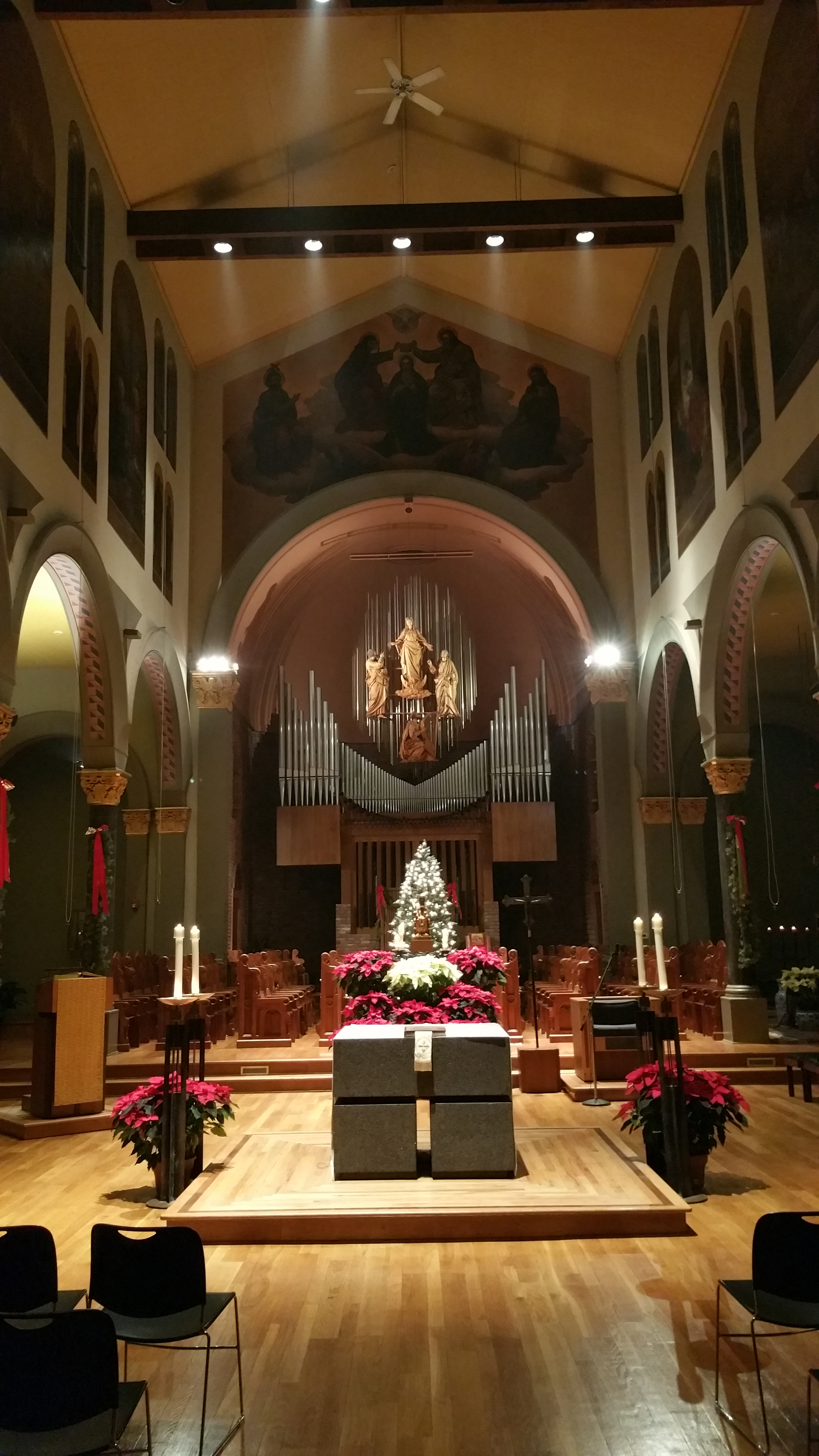
The choir, in which members of Newark Abbey pray the Divine Office, is visible from the front of the nave of St. Mary's Abbey Church.

The monastery has its roots in St. Mary's Church, a parish founded in 1842 to serve the immigrant German Catholics. By 1857, monks were sent from Saint Vincent Archabbey (one of two Archabbeys in the United States) in Latrobe, Pennsylvania, to staff the parish and establish a monastic community. The newly-established community was known as Saint Mary's Priory. In 1868, responding to the request of the local Bishop for a school for the children of the workers who would find it difficult to allow their sons to go to a boarding school, the monks founded St, Benedict's College (later St. Benedict's Prep).

In 1884, the monastery became independent of Saint Vincent and became known as St. Mary's Abbey. In 1889, at the request of Bishop Denis Bradley, monks from Newark founded a monastery, school, and parish in Manchester, New Hampshire.This community became independent in 1927 and is now known as Saint Anselm Abbey. In 1924, the Newark community bought land in Morris County, and a second daughter-house was established. The title “St. Mary’s Abbey” would be transferred to the daughter house in 1956, with the Newark community becoming known once again as St. Mary's Priory. In 1968, the Newark community was granted independence from St. Mary's Abbey, and took the legal name, the Benedictine Abbey of Newark, being known popularly as Newark Abbey.

In the 1980s, the Abbey faced declining numbers and took out advertisements to appeal to potential monks. The abbey has been the subject of coverage praising its efforts to maintain their educational apostolate at Saint Benedict's Prep.

The monks have a relationship with Nigerian bishop Cardinal Francis Arinze, who has been a frequent visitor to the Abbey.

== Abbots ==
- Rt. Rev. Augustine Curley, O.S.B. (2022-present), Third Abbot of Newark Abbey
- Rt. Rev. Melvin Valvano, O.S.B. (1973-2022), Second Abbot of Newark Abbey
- Rt. Rev. Ambrose Clark, O.S.B. (1968-1973), First Abbot of Newark Abbey
- Rt. Rev. Martin Burne, O.S.B. (1967-1968), Fifth Abbot of St. Mary's Abbey [Newark community regains independence in 1968]
- Rt. Rev. Patrick O'Brien, O.S.B. (1937-1967), Fourth Abbot of St. Mary's Abbey [Abbatial title transferred to Morristown in 1956]
- Rt. Rev. Ernest Helmstetter, OS.B. (1910-1937), Third Abbot of St. Mary's Abbey (Newark)
- Rt. Rev. Hilary Pfraengle, O.S.B. (1886-1909), Second Abbot of St. Mary's Abbey (Newark)
- Rt. Rev. James Zilliox, O.S.B. (1885-1886), First Abbot of St. Mary's Abbey (Newark)

== Saint Benedict's Preparatory School ==
The abbey operates a K-12 school, Saint Benedict's Preparatory School that has been active since 1868, although it was briefly closed from 1972-1973 due to disagreements within the monastic community about whether to continue serving the community, which had seen demographic changes after World War II. The monastic community made the decision to reopen the school in 1973, electing the then 26-year-old Rev. Edwin Leahy, O.S.B. as headmaster.

Originally founded as an all-boys institution, Saint Benedict's began enrolling high school girls in 2020, following the closure of Benedictine Academy in nearby Elizabeth, New Jersey. As of 2022, Saint Benedict's (commonly known as "Benedict's") enrolls approximately 1,000 students across four divisions: co-ed Elementary Division (K-6), co-ed Middle Division (7-8), an all-female Girls Prep Division (9-12), and an all-male Boys Prep Division (9-12).

Boarding facilities are available on the property of the school for international students, as well as for students who have dysfunctional homes, or in the event of a crisis at home. This temporary housing is the formalization of an earlier system through which some students could live at the school. In recent decades, alumni Charles Cawley and Robert E. Brennan, provided several large donations to keep the institution open, and to facilitate new construction, including the building of athletic facilities.

=== Press Coverage ===
In recent years the school has received significant press coverage for its original and innovative approaches to education. In 2016, correspondents from 60 Minutes spent a year filming a profile of the school entitled "The Resurrection of St. Benedict's" and featured interviews with monks, faculty, and students. In 2021, the New York Times published a feature article about Benedict's Appalachian Trail Project, the 50-mile overnight hike that is required of all students. A 2020 documentary entitled "Benedict Men" was produced by Stephen Curry and follows the Benedict's boys basketball team throughout the 2018-2019 season.

==== The Rule ====
The critically acclaimed documentary about Newark Abbey and St. Benedict's Prep, The Rule (2014), by Emmy-nominated, Newark-based filmmakers Marylou and Jerome Bongiorno, was released theatrically, broadcast nationally on PBS, and was screened by the White House Initiative on Educational Excellence for African Americans at the U.S. Department of Education.

== Saint Mary's Abbey Church ==
=== History ===
==== 1842-1854 ====
The pastoral care of Newark’s German Catholic population began in 1838, when Rev. John Stephen Raffeiner and/or Rev. Nicolas Balleis, O.S.B. would travel to Newark from New York twice a month to offer services for German immigrants. In 1842, Balleis founded a German-speaking parish community, housed in St. Mary’s Church, a small, wood-framed structure dedicated to the Immaculate Conception. The first years of the parish’s history were tumultuous. Balleis was an Austrian nationalist whose pro-German, anti-Hungarian political sentiments, coupled with his difficult personality, won him many enemies. In addition to local controversies, the fledgling community at St. Mary’s was caught in the crosshairs of the xenophobic, nativist, Know-Nothing movement. On September 5, 1854, a mob of approximately 2,500 members of the Newark Lodge of Orangemen, affiliates of the American Protestant Association, attacked St. Mary’s, killing two men and destroying most of the church interior. In the years that followed, however, the German-speaking congregation continued to grow, and in the aftermath of the riots, construction of a new, much larger church was completed under the direction of the newly-founded Benedictine community in Newark.

=== Architecture ===
St. Mary's Abbey Church is notable for its architecture and has been listened on the National Register of Historic Places since 1972.

When the present church was completed in 1857, the exterior was entirely red brick, and the basilica-style interior could seat 1,000 people. Oriented with a semi-domed apse facing the east, the central nave of the church was straight and rectangular, with smaller side-aisles on either side. All the walls were painted white, and the lower walls contained five clear glass windows on both the north and south walls; the upper walls contained ten pairs of smaller windows with semi-circular tops. Thick walls and exterior buttresses supported most of the weight of the building and ten iron pillars within the nave formed the bases of a dozen arches that rose to support the upper wall. Stylized pillar-like features appeared on the east wall, forming the base of a semi-circular arch over the main marble altar in the sanctuary, as well two other arches over the deep-set alcoves containing two side altars.

The oral history of the parish long held that there was no architect for the 1857 church and that instead, the Benedictines had given a group of parishioners a selection of pre-existing churches from which to choose a model, with the committee selecting St. Boniface Abbey in Munich.[4] Later, historians have credited the famed church architect Patrick Keely as the architect of St. Mary’s, but recent scholarship by Augustine Curley, O.S.B. has uncovered that the actual architect was Henry Engelbert, a German-American architect most well-known for designing New York’s Grand Hotel. Engelbert's design is Rundbogenstil, a distinctively German style popular in Bavaria in the early modern period, characterized by basilica-style naves, semicircular apses, rounded arches with weight-bearing pillars, the incorporation of iron, and decorative murals.

To top off the impressive structure, a six-story high, 125-foot campanile rose from the southwest corner of the church, towering over the nave and over the city of Newark itself. Geographically, St. Mary’s is at the top of a relatively step hill overlooking the downtown commercial district. At the time of the church’s completion in 1857, the 125-foot campanile of St. Mary’s was most likely the tallest structure in the city, and which the help of the local geography, it certainly would have been the most prominent feature of the still steeple-dominated Newark skyline.

The interior decoration of the church was carried out by Br. Cosmas Wolf, O.S.B. and was not completed until over a decade after the church building itself was finished. Upon completion, the sanctuary was full of statuary, with the Virgin Mary, Isaiah, David, and John the Apostle appearing on the high altar, flanked by Ss. Benedict and Boniface. William Lamprecht was hired to paint murals on the interior walls, completing an 11-image cycle of scenes from the life of St. Mary, culminating in the Crowning of Mary as Queen of Heaven high above the apse.

Interior decoration in the church would continue in the following decades. In 1890, the first stained-glass window appeared: a miter within a six-pointed star on the western, street-facing façade of the church, a celebration of the elevation of the parish to an abbey church in 1884. Further decorations were added in 1907: round murals depicting saints and scenes from the life of St. Benedict on the ceiling above the side aisles as well as stained glass windows from Munich.

In 1958, Prior Martin Burne, O.S.B. relocated the choir stalls from the third-floor chapel of the adjoining monastery into the sanctuary of St. Mary’s, marking the first time that the Divine Office was celebrated in the church on a daily basis.

A complete remodeling of the church interior, including the construction of a brand-new altar, ambo, and other furnishings, followed in 1986.
