= William Linder =

Catholic priest and American community development leader

Monsignor William J. Linder
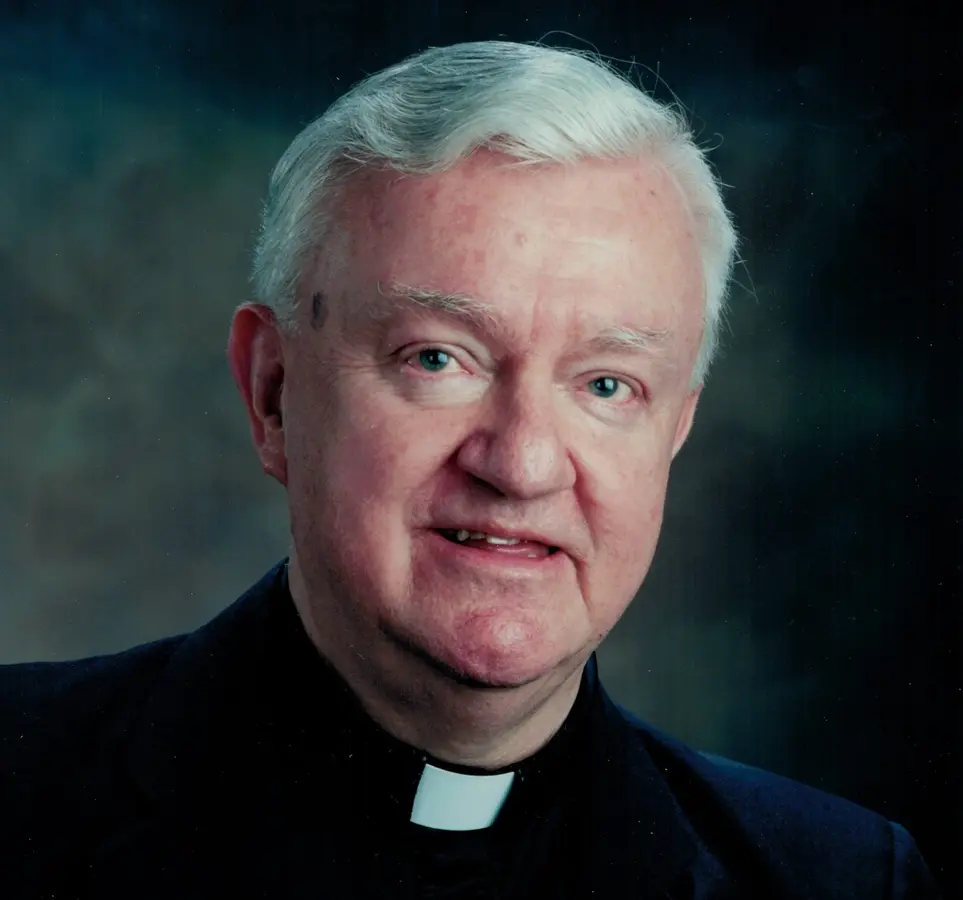
- Born: June 5, 1936
- Died: June 8, 2018 (aged 82)
- Education: Seton Hall University, Fordham University
- Occupation: Catholic priest
- Religion: Roman Catholic
- Ordained: May 25, 1963 (aged 26)
- Title: Monsignor

Monsignor William J. Linder was a Catholic priest and an American community development leader who founded the New Community Corporation. He was a 1991 MacArthur Fellow.

== Life ==
William Joseph Linder was born June 5, 1936, at Christ Hospital in Jersey City, NJ, and grew up in West New York, NJ. He attended St. Peter’s Preparatory School in Jersey City and graduated in 1954. He then continued engineering at Manhattan College and in 1955, transferred to Seton Hall University graduating with a B.A. in classical languages and a M.A. in philosophy. In 1958 he entered Immaculate Conception Seminary in Darlington, New Jersey and was ordained a priest on May 25, 1963. In May 1988, he completed his Ph.D. in sociology at Fordham University.

Monsignor Linder passed on June 8, 2018.

== Honors and legacy ==
Monsignor Linder was recipient to many accolades during his lifetime, including honorary degrees from several universities, the New Jersey Governor's Gold Medal, the MacArthur Fellows Award, the National Housing Hall of Fame honor, the Key to the City of Newark, the Rudy Bruner Award for Urban Excellence and the Entrepreneurial American Leaders Award.

In 1968, Monsignor Linder founded the New Community Corporation in response to the 1967 Newark riots.
