= Trevor Reckling =

American professional baseball player (born 1989)

- Starting pitcher
- Born: May 22, 1989 (age 37); Livingston, New Jersey, U.S.
- Bats: Left Throws: Left
- Stats at Baseball Reference
Medals
Men's baseball
Representing United States
Baseball World Cup
Gold medal – first place	2009 Nettuno	National team

Trevor Reckling (born May 22, 1989) is an American former professional baseball player.

== Career ==
Raised in Irvington, New Jersey, Reckling pitched for St. Benedict's Preparatory School.

In 2009, Reckling had a successful season in the minor league system. Originally, the organization expected to have him in the Class A California League, but after the death of pitcher Nick Adenhart, Reckling was needed at Double-A Arkansas when Sean O'Sullivan was promoted to Triple-A Salt Lake. Reckling made the All-Star team, the Futures Game, and played for Team USA at the end of the season. MLB.com picked Reckling as the Angels organization's Pitcher of the Year, saying, "What didn't the young lefty do? He turned 20 in May, yet led the organization in ERA (2.68) and was second in strikeouts (122). His 2.93 ERA and 106 K's in the Texas League were good making him the youngest player for the Texas League. Then, for good measure, he went 2–0 with a 0.69 ERA in three starts for Team USA during its IBAF World Cup gold medal run. Trevor broke a Guinness Book World Record versus China striking out 11 tying Burt Hootens three decade old record for Team USA."

Reckling was ranked the fourth best prospect in the Angels' organization after the 2009 season by Baseball Prospectus and Baseball America. After former Angels pitcher John Lackey signed with the Boston Red Sox, Orange County Register reporter Mark Whicker said that Reckling "should get to Anaheim at some point in 2010."

On May 10, 2012, the Angels released Reckling. He had allowed 15 walks and 14 earned runs in 6 2/3 innings at Class A in the season to date.

In 2013, Reckling pitched for the independent Bridgeport Bluefish of the Atlantic League.

On November 2, 2013, the Cincinnati Reds signed him to a minor league contract. He was released on March 17, 2014.

He signed a minor league contract with the Arizona Diamondbacks in February 2015, but the team released him the following month. He pitched in two games in 2015 for the independent Rockland Boulders of the Canadian-American Association

He signed a contract with Dutch club Neptunus of the Honkbal Hoofdklasse in May 2017 but was removed from the team's roster on July 6.

On April 18, 2019, Reckling signed with the York Revolution of the Atlantic League of Professional Baseball. He was released on May 8, 2019 after pitching in three games for the team.

== Pitch repertoire ==
Reckling's fastball has average velocity but has strong sinking action. His changeup was projected to be effective as an "out" pitch. Because of the strong break on his pitches and a complicated delivery, Reckling often struggled with control.
