= Affinity credit card =

Credit card branded with an organization's identity

An affinity credit card is a credit card issued by a bank in partnership with an organization such as a charity, nonprofit, university, alumni association, sports team or professional body, and branded with that organization's name and imagery. It allows members and supporters, those who have an "affinity" for the organization, to carry a card associated with it, while the issuing bank pays the organization for the business the card generates.

== History ==
The affinity credit card is generally credited to Charles Cawley, who in 1982 founded Maryland Bank National Association, later MBNA, as a Delaware spin-off of Maryland National Bank. After opening the subsidiary, he persuaded the alumni association of Georgetown University, his alma mater, to sponsor a credit card for its members, an arrangement generally described as the origin of the affinity card. Building on the practice of placing the logos of universities and associations on the card, MBNA grew into one of the largest credit card issuers in the world before being acquired by Bank of America in 2006 for about $35 billion.

== Structure and economics ==
An affinity card carries the branding of the partner organization but is issued, underwritten and serviced by the bank. The bank commonly pays the organization an amount for each new account opened together with a share of cardholder spending, which on charity cards is presented as a donation. Banks often let applicants choose which of several organizations to support. These payments are met from the interchange, interest and fee revenue the card generates, and some programs are run as revenue-sharing arrangements between the issuer and the organization. In the European Union and the United Kingdom, interchange fees on consumer credit card transactions have been capped at 0.3% of the transaction value since December 2015 under the Interchange Fee Regulation.

== Affinity and co-branded cards ==
Affinity cards are closely related to co-branded credit cards. A co-branded card is generally linked to a commercial, for-profit brand such as an airline, hotel or retailer and rewards the cardholder directly with points, miles or discounts, whereas an affinity card is linked to a nonprofit or membership organization and directs a benefit to that organization; the two terms are sometimes used interchangeably. Because the partner is usually a nonprofit, affinity cards often carry fewer or less valuable cardholder rewards than mainstream or co-branded cards.

== Reception ==
The contribution an affinity card generates for its partner organization is typically small. A 2018 review by The NonProfit Times found payout rates no better than around 0.08 cents per dollar spent, so that a cardholder spending $10,000 a year would generate about $8 for the organization. Commentators have noted that a cardholder can often raise more for a cause by choosing the card with the highest cash back and donating the proceeds directly.

== See also ==
- Cashback reward program
- Interchange fee
- Loyalty program
