= Revolution '67 =

- Directed by: Marylou Tibaldo-Bongiorno
- Produced by: Marylou Tibaldo-Bongiorno
- Cinematography: Jerome Bongiorno
- Edited by: Jerome Bongiorno
- Release date: 2007
- Running time: 90 minutes
- Country: United States
- Language: English

Revolution '67 is a 2007 documentary film about the black riots of the 1960s. With the philosophy of nonviolence giving way to the Black Power Movement, race riots were breaking out in Jersey City, Harlem, and Watts, Los Angeles. In 1967, black Newark, New Jersey taxi driver John Smith was arrested for a traffic violation and allegedly beaten and killed, precipitating the 1967 Newark riots. Revolution '67 details Newark's reaction to the incident.

Revolution '67 was produced, directed, shot and edited by Marylou and Jerome Bongiorno and was aired on PBS as part of its Point of View series.
