= Marylou and Jerome Bongiorno =

American husband-and-wife team of filmmakers

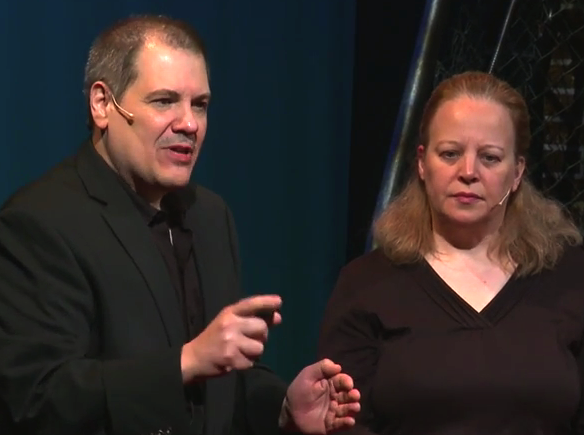
Marylou and Jerome Bongiorno at TEDxNJIT 2015

Marylou Tibaldo-Bongiorno and Jerome Bongiorno are husband-and-wife filmmakers based in Newark, New Jersey, USA. Marylou is a producer, director and screenwriter who received her MFA from the graduate film program at New York University. Jerome is a cinematographer, editor, animator and screenwriter.

Their critically acclaimed films include the feature-length 3Rs trilogy of documentaries on urban America focusing on Newark: Revolution '67 on the 1967 Newark riots/rebellion (2007); The Rule, on the highly successful urban school model of Newark Abbey and Saint Benedict's Preparatory School (screened by the White House Initiative on Educational Excellence for African Americans at the U.S. Department of Education) (2014); and Rust, on solutions to inner city poverty and racism (2021), all broadcast nationally on PBS, and released in theaters and on streaming platforms with companion Curriculum Guides for High Schools. Their Emmy-nominated documentary Mother-Tongue: Italian American Sons & Mothers featured Martin Scorsese, John Turturro, Rudy Giuliani and Pat DiNizio.

The Bongiornos' museum installations in 3D are New Work: Art in 3D which began with Newark in 3D, commissioned and exhibited by the Newark Museum from 2009 to 2010 and reinstalled in 2016, and installed at Newark Liberty International Airport from 2013 to 2014 as the airport's first art film; The Brooklyn Waterfront in 3D, presented by the Museum of the City of New York in 2010; and SI3D (Staten Island in 3D) commissioned and exhibited by the Staten Island Museum from 2015 to 2017.

They created and hosted the Watermark (fiction film) Conference at Wingspread and the Newark Poverty Reduction Conference at Rutgers University and presented solutions to poverty at TEDxNJIT.

Their inventive, feature-length documentary series American Women Saints: Elizabeth Ann Seton and Frances Xavier Cabrini (2024), on the iconic saints Elizabeth Ann Seton and Frances Xavier Cabrini, is broadcast nationally on PBS.

The Bongiornos were recipients of film fellowships at the MacDowell Colony, Ledig House Art Omi, and Wildacres.

== Fictional films ==
- Love & Arguments (2011-): twenty one short films inspired by classic literature and current events.
- The Black Monk (2017): Anton Chekhov-inspired, feature-length film being used to teach psychosis in medical schools and literary adaption in universities.
- Hearing Voices (2018) and Columbus on Trial (2019): a series of short films depicting the ghosts of historical figures returning to our modern world to confront their complicated legacies.
- Our Return to Italy (2023): a short film about a New Jersey, multigenerational, winemaking family that decides to uproot to the motherland.
- La Storia D’Amore Siciliana di Chiara; Lasciando La Sicilia; Palermo: Amore e Fontane; Palermo: Amore e Cannoli; and Amore nel Sannio (2024-2025): a series of short films, in Italian, celebrating the culture of Southern Italy.
