= The Rule (film) =

2014 documentary

The Rule is a documentary about Newark Abbey and Saint Benedict's Preparatory School, in Newark, New Jersey, United States, by Emmy-nominated, Newark-based filmmakers Marylou and Jerome Bongiorno. It was released theatrically in 2014, and was broadcast nationally on PBS.

In 2016, The Rule was screened by the White House Initiative on Educational Excellence for African Americans at the U.S. Department of Education.
