= New Community Corporation =

Not-for-profit community development corporation

- Founded: 1968
- Founder: Monsignor William J. Linder
- Location: Newark, New Jersey
- Website: www.newcommunity.org

New Community Corporation (NCC) is a not-for-profit community development corporation based in Newark, New Jersey. NCC focuses on community organizing, provision of a variety of community-enhancing services, and resident participation in agency operation. Early prototypes of the community action movement included local housing and service agencies started by the Ford Foundation Gray Areas Initiative and the United States Office of Economic Opportunity, and both federal and private Mobilization for Youth in New York City.

== History, developments and services ==
=== Formation ===
New Community Corporation was formed by a group of community leaders in 1968, as a response to the riots of July, 1967, which left 26 dead and caused approximately $15 million in property damage. A local Roman Catholic church parish facilitated a process of community organization that identified the needs of low-income neighborhoods in Newark's Central Ward. As a result of this process, the New Community Corporation was formally incorporated with a board of directors composed entirely of community residents. Based upon input from local residents regarding community needs, the board decided to focus New Community's initial efforts on construction and operation of low-income housing.

Several years of planning, fundraising and negotiation with local, state and federal officials followed. By 1973, New Community had secured property and financing commitments that would allow it to construct a 120-unit family housing complex.

=== Housing ventures ===
NCC's "Homes" family housing complex was built as a series of five-story mid-rise buildings surrounding a center courtyard. It was occupied in 1975. In later years, NCC utilized high-rise design for senior citizen housing (as did many other low-income senior housing managers; senior citizens are generally seen to accommodate better to high-density elevator buildings than families with children). However, NCC switched to 2 and 3 story townhouse design for most newly constructed family housing projects thereafter.

After the "Homes" family complex opened, NCC continued on an ambitious low-income housing development effort, including new construction, rehabilitation of older buildings that were abandoned or converted from other use, and acquisition of occupied housing complexes from other owners. Most of New Community's housing efforts were centered in Newark, but by 1995, the organization was also managing low-income complexes in Jersey City, Englewood, and a market-rate housing development in suburban Eatontown, NJ. The latter complex, called Stony Hill Apartments, was obtained from the portfolio of a failed savings & loan institution. NCC originally intended to dedicate some of Stony Hill's apartments to low-income apartment seekers, but decided to sell the complex to private interests at a profit. A senior low-income housing complex in urban Orange, New Jersey was opened by NCC in 2003.

Most of NCC's housing consists of subsidized rental units for low and very-low income families. However, in 1998, NCC opened its first homeownership project for working families, the 206-unit Community Hills complex built on the site of the former Hayes Homes high-rise public housing towers. Under the terms of a HUD HOPE 1 grant, the Newark Housing Authority donated land for this development, and HUD subsidized development and construction costs. Since then NCC has developed 24 additional homeownership units, and is planning further homeownership projects in neighborhoods where most housing is currently rented.

=== Child daycare affiliation ===
During the early 1970s, New Community was also active in developing and constructing or rehabilitating facilities to be used by the Babyland Nursery organization (later Babyland Family Services) for the daycare of infants and children. Babyland is a not-for-profit community organization that originated within the same community organization process that followed the July 1967 Civic Disorders in Newark. As a result of common origins, Babyland and New Community coordinated and integrated their facilities and program activities for approximately three decades. Although Babyland served many residents of New Community housing, the proportion of children and families living outside the New Community network increased over this time.

=== Initial diversifications ===
In 1978, NCC took over the management, maintenance and security functions at its housing (and Babyland day care centers). NCC also began providing social service support for its residents through social workers assigned to its buildings.

=== Health care ===
In 1986, New Community expanded into health care with the completion of a newly constructed Extended Care Facility (an $11 million, 180- bed nursing home serving primarily Medicaid patients). It also established a series of medical day care programs based at the Extended Care Facility and at some of its senior apartment buildings. By 1992 it added a home health care agency and a homemaking assistance program serving medically indigent households. In 1999, New Community took over the Family Service Bureau of Newark, giving NCC greater resources in dealing with mental health issues. In 2000, the 500-employee Essex Valley Visiting Nurse Association was merged into the New Community network (through common boards of directors), expanding NCC's client base and the range of professional nursing services that it could provide.

=== Human services ===
By 1985, New Community had expanded its outreach to its own family residents and to other families in the community with a youth activity program, a credit union, and a job referral agency. After 1990, these were supplemented with a variety of grant-funded programs targeting youth and families having particular needs, including services for persons with HIV or AIDS. Also, New Community instituted a bi-lingual Hispanic outreach program (the Hispanic Development Corporation) in 1992. Finally, in 1997, New Community opened a newly constructed 17,000 sq ft (1,600 m^{2}). Neighborhood Center which contains a stage, a basketball court and classrooms. This facility has been a key asset in expanding NCC's outreach to youth and families.

In 1988, New Community partnered with the Hartz Mountain Corporation and the State of New Jersey to newly construct a 102-unit apartment complex dedicated to homeless families in the Newark area (named Harmony House). New Community provides an intensive support program for Harmony House residents; this includes on-site daycare (through cooperation with Babyland Nursery), counseling, education, substance abuse program referrals, job placement and housing relocation assistance, and after-school activities for youth. Although generally considered successful, the State of New Jersey did not replicate the Harmony House model in other cities.

=== Business ventures ===
In 1983, New Community began the rehabilitation of a former Roman Catholic church built in 1882 into the Saint Joseph's office-entertainment complex. The building opened for business in 1985 with a fine-dining restaurant, a sandwich shop, a conference area and an exercise spa. These business ventures were controlled by individual for-profit corporations controlled by a New Community subsidiary (through common boards of directors).

In 1987, NCC teamed up with the Pathmark supermarket chain to develop a $12 million, 55,000 (interior) square foot supermarket and satellite store complex having a 227 car parking lot. The new supermarket opened in 1989, located in a Newark neighborhood that saw its last supermarket close near the time of the 1967 Civic Disorders. New Community invested nearly 10 years of planning effort and legal fees in acquiring site control, and gaining zoning clearances and financing (despite a variety of objections from landowners and political interests). Using the same business model from the St. Joseph's complex, NCC set up a variety of satellite businesses adjacent to the Pathmark supermarket, including a donut franchise, a fast-food restaurant, a print shop, and a mailbox / shipping services center. The development of the Pathmark center has been cited by various academic and urban assistance groups as a textbook example of reintroducing supermarkets into inner-city areas, and the site has been visited by a variety of other community development groups from cities throughout the United States.

In contrast to a small Fashion Institute producing custom clothing and home furnishings (NCC's smallest business venture), NCC developed a $3 million, 38,000 sq ft (3,500 m^{2}) factory facility on the site of a former Borden's milk processing plant. The "New Community Technologies" factory was dedicated to the construction of pre-fabricated housing and school building components for sale to local housing developers and school boards, and opened in 2001 (after limited production commenced in an adjacent storage facility in 1999).

=== Job training ===
In 1993, New Community expanded into vocational training, starting various career classes for low-income residents. The initial classes centered on career fields that New Community was already familiar with, e.g. health care and food service; however, the curriculum was later expanded. In 1999, NCC centralized most of these classes within a new $2.4 million, 24,500-square-foot (2,280 m^{2}) Workforce Development Center, and increased its cooperation with State and local welfare-to-work initiatives. One training program remained at a special facility, a cooperative venture with the Ford Motor Company and a local Ford dealership that trains low-income urban residents to assume careers as professional auto mechanics. That program was started in 1996 at a garage equipped with classrooms, tools, and modern auto diagnostic equipment.

=== Financial services ===
By 1998, New Community further expanded its presence in the financial services field (it opened a credit union for residents, employees and families otherwise served by NCC in 1985). It began two new programs, the first offering loans for the start-up or expansion of small businesses that create jobs for Newark area residents. The second venture, called Garden State Affordable Housing, matched investors interested in federal low-income housing tax credits with developers of low-income housing throughout the State of New Jersey, operating as an investment pool. This mechanism provides much-needed financing for the development of affordable rental housing.

=== Education ===
New Community had become involved in elementary grade level education in the mid-1980s, through a cooperative relationship with a local Roman Catholic parish school. In the late 1990s, NCC took advantage of New Jersey State legislation allowing the formation of private charter schools that operate with funding from the local school board. In 1999, NCC opened its New Horizons Charter School for 500 Kindergarten to 5th grade students at a newly constructed facility in Newark. In 2000, NCC gained permission from the N.J. State Board of Education to open a second charter school, the "Lady Liberty Academy", for 300 students in K-8th grades in September, 2001 at a rehabilitated Roman Catholic parish school that had recently closed. Also in 2000, NCC opened an Early Learning Center at its Community Hills homeownership complex which offers formal pre-school classes for 3- and 4-year-olds.

== Financial uncertainties ==
In 2001, after taking over the Essex Valley Visiting Nurse Association, NCC and its direct affiliates employed approximately 2,000 employees and managed or had developed 2,818 units of housing. However, financial pressures and accumulated debt stemming from the organization's rapid expansion in the 1990s, and from reductions in federal housing subsidies, required an assessment of priorities and a rationalization of programs lacking sufficient financial support (i.e., from grants, donations, fees or sales). By late 2004, several of the for-profit business ventures were closed, including the building components factory, the print shop, the fast-food restaurant at the Pathmark store, the mailbox store, and the exercise spa. The 754-unit, five-story Douglass-Harrison housing complex built in the 1930s and sold to NCC in 1983 for $50 by Prudential Insurance was closed in 2005. Douglass-Harrison was difficult to maintain and its very small apartments and lack of elevators failed to meet modern housing standards (NCC plans to build 130 modern housing units on the site). Also, several branches of NCC's medical day care program were closed. By 2002, there was a reduction in managerial staffing at the corporate level. Also, in 2001 New Community and Babyland Family Services terminated their cooperative agreement to jointly develop new facilities and programs and integrate them within NCC's broad array of activities.

== Conclusion ==
NCC is developing additional homeownership housing, and recently built and opened a four-story office building so as to consolidate the management of its medical care services. It recently opened a for-profit temporary staffing agency for office workers, and continues to participate in welfare-to-work assistance contracts. The Pathmark supermarket itself, now owned by the Great Atlantic and Pacific Tea Company (A&P), continues to operate both for Pathmark as operator of the store, and for New Community as owner and manager of the store complex.

However, a growing number of experienced community development organizations in Newark now compete with NCC for vital grant funding. Most of these organizations did not exist when NCC opened its first housing complex in 1975. Also, a 1993 ethnographic study by the New School University (published in 1997) indicates that although New Community's broad range of services benefited its tenants in numerous ways, it could not shield them from the negative forces plaguing the surrounding neighborhoods, i.e. crime, gang activity, substance abuse, unemployment, social isolation, insufficient education and other human capital, etc. Although community development corporations such as the New Community Corporation will continue to play a significant role in addressing the needs of low-income inner city residents, their promise as the "magic bullet" against the cycle of poverty is now in doubt.
