= Ghassan Nehme =

Lebanese basketball player (born 1995)

Personal information
- Born: August 17, 1995 (age 31)
- Listed height: 6 ft 3 in (1.91 m)
- Listed weight: 173.8 lb (79 kg)

Career information
- High school: Cheyenne Mountain (Colorado Springs, Colorado); Saint Benedict's Prep (Newark, New Jersey)
- College: Fairleigh Dickinson (2015–2017)
- NBA draft: 2018: undrafted
- Playing career: 2017–present
- Position: Shooting guard / point guard

Career history
- 2017–2018: Sagesse Club
- 2018–2019: Atlas Club

Ghassan Nehme is a former Lebanese professional basketball player for Atlas Club in the Lebanese Basketball League.
