= Philip McHarris =

American academic and author

Philip V. McHarris
- Born: December 4, 1992 (age 33); Bronx, New York, U.S.
- Education: Boston College; Yale University
- Occupations: Academic, author
- Years active: 2012–present
- Website: www.philipvmcharris.com

Philip V. McHarris (born December 4, 1992) is an American academic and author. He is an assistant professor of Black studies at the University of Rochester.

McHarris has been a frequent contributor for The New York Times, The Washington Post, Al Jazeera, and Essence regarding issues related to race, policing, housing, and social inequality. He has appeared on HBO, CNN, PBS, ABC News, and MSNBC. His commentary has also been featured in Time, the Los Angeles Times, and MTV.

McHarris has keynoted and spoken at universities across the country, including Harvard University, Iona College, Boston College, Yale University Art Gallery, and Princeton University. McHarris was also the recipient of the Boston College 31st Martin Luther King Jr. Memorial Award. In 2020, he was selected as one of the Root 100 most influential African Americans.

== Early life and education ==
McHarris was born in Bronx, New York, and grew up in Newark, New Jersey. McHarris attended high school at Saint Benedict's Preparatory School and received his Bachelor of Arts degree in sociology from Boston College. McHarris received a Master of Arts in sociology and African American studies from Yale University and a Master of Philosophy in sociology and African American studies from Yale University. He also attended Princeton University as a PhD exchange scholar. McHarris completed his PhD in sociology and African American studies at Yale University. McHarris' academic research focuses on race, policing, housing, inequality, and mass incarceration.

== Career ==
After completing his PhD at Yale, McHarris was awarded a Presidential Postdoctoral Research Fellowship at Princeton University in 2021.

In 2023, McHarris joined the University of Rochester as an assistant professor in the Department of Black Studies, becoming one of the inaugural faculty members of the newly established department.

In July 2024, McHarris published his first book, Beyond Policing, through Legacy Lit, an imprint of Hachette Book Group. The book examines community-based approaches to public safety beyond traditional policing. Kirkus Reviews described it as "a deeply researched, profoundly optimistic vision."

== Media ==
McHarris has frequently written and provided commentary on politics and social issues in news media outlets. He has appeared on CNN, PBS, ABC News, MSNBC, and Axios on HBO. His commentary has also been featured on BBC, Time, NPR, and NBC.

McHarris has been a frequent contributor for The New York Times, The Washington Post, Slate, Al Jazeera, and Essence. His commentary has also appeared in Time, CNN, the Los Angeles Times, and MTV.

== Politics and activism ==
McHarris has been an advocate of the Black Lives Matter movement and efforts to end police violence. He has advocated for divesting from policing and reinvesting funds into community resources and alternative safety and emergency response systems.

In 2012 while an undergraduate student at Boston College, McHarris organized a student rally (along with Ben St. Gerard) following the killing of Trayvon Martin two months earlier. In 2015 McHarris was a co-founder of the NYC chapter of BYP100, an African American youth organization in the United States with the main focus on community organizing, voter mobilization, and other social justice campaigns.

== Publications and works ==
- McHarris, Philip V. (2024). Beyond Policing. Legacy Lit/Hachette Book Group. ISBN 978-1538725665.
- McHarris, Philip V. (May 30, 2020). "No More Money for the Police". The New York Times.
- McHarris, Philip V. (May 28, 2020). "Why does the Minneapolis police department look like a military unit?". The Washington Post.
- McHarris, Philip V. (April 10, 2020). "Public Housing Residents May Be Some Of The Hardest Hit By COVID-19 Outbreak". Essence.
- Vargas, Robert; McHarris, Philip (January 8, 2016). "Race and State in City Police Spending Growth: 1980 to 2010". Sociology of Race and Ethnicity. 3 (1): 96–112. doi:10.1177/2332649216650692. S2CID 156271269.
