= Robert Peace =

American scholar (1980–2011)

Robert DeShaun Peace (June 25, 1980 – May 18, 2011) was an American scholar and teacher who attended Yale University, where he graduated with honors in molecular biophysics and biochemistry. His life and experiences are the subject of the 2014 biography The Short and Tragic Life of Robert Peace, written by his college roommate, Jeff Hobbs. Peace died at the age of 30 in a drug-related shooting.

== Early life ==
Born to Jackie Peace and Robert Douglas, Robert Peace grew up in Orange, New Jersey, which borders Newark. Rob lived with his mother and grandparents and excelled in school while attending church and forming strong friendships in his neighborhood. When Rob was seven, his father was arrested for an alleged murder, convicted, and sent to prison. Rob visited him often in prison and his father remained an important part of his life. His mother worked long hours primarily in school and hospital cafeterias and sacrificed to send her son to St. Benedict's Preparatory School, a private middle and high school. There, he excelled academically (4.0 GPA) and athletically (captaining the swimming and water polo teams) and upon graduation was the school’s student body leader and recipient of the Presidential Award.

== Yale University ==
After high school, Peace was sponsored by Charles Cawley, a bank executive, to attend Yale University, where he majored in molecular biophysics and biochemistry. He played on the school’s club water polo team, which he co-captained for two years. He worked in a cancer and infectious disease laboratory associated with the Yale Medical School. Peace also worked in the dining hall as a dishwasher and earned money selling marijuana to his classmates. Peace graduated in 2002 with honors. One of his roommates was Jeff Hobbs, an English major from Kennett Square, Pennsylvania. While in college, Peace remained involved with his father’s ongoing legal case, firmly believing that his father was both set up by the police and also deprived of a fair trial due to his race and indigent circumstances.

== Career and death ==
After graduation from Yale, Peace taught biology and coached water polo for five years at his high school alma mater in Newark, New Jersey, winning a Teacher of the Year award. He persisted in his efforts to establish his father’s innocence until Robert Douglas received a diagnosis of brain cancer and died while incarcerated. Peace was 26 at the time. Peace began a new career working at Newark Liberty International Airport, where he used employee standby flight benefits to travel the world extensively. He spent a great amount of time in Rio de Janeiro. While back home, he initiated a real estate venture intended to renovate abandoned homes and improve his neighborhood. In his late 20s, while he refocused on his academic pursuits and began applying to graduate programs, he continued to sell marijuana on a small scale. He was murdered, aged 30, in a drug-related shooting during a home invasion.
