= Steve Sims (entrepreneur) =

Founder and CEO of the concierge service Bluefish

- Born: July 9, 1966
- Died: July 7, 2025 (aged 58); Los Angeles, California, U.S.
- Occupation: CEO of Bluefish
- Website: https://www.stevedsims.com/

Steve Sims (born 1966) was the founder and CEO of the luxury concierge service Bluefish. In 2017, Sims published a book, Bluefishing: The Art of Making Things Happen and in 2022 his second book "Go for Stupid - The Art of Achieving Ridiculous Goals". Sims grew up in East London and met his wife, Clare, when he was 16 years old.

== Career ==
Sims began his career as a Bricklayer in London. In 1980, Sims started a stockbroker job in London, where he worked for about 6 months. Eventually, Sims transferred to Hong Kong where he was fired in 5 days. After losing his stockbroking job, Sims stayed in Hong Kong where he worked as a Doorman for a Night Club in the area, where he went to parties and met their attendees, forming the network that would initially support Bluefish. Sims has arranged many adventures for clients including:

- Private Dinner for 6 at the Feet of Michelangelo's David
- Dinners in Italy while being Serenaded by Andrea Bocelli
- Underwater Tours of the Titanic Through Bluefin, Sims has networked and befriended many powerful people including: Donald Trump, Sting, Andrea Bocelli and Elon Musk. In 2016, Sims landed a publishing deal with Simon & Schuster for his book, "Bluefish: The Art of Making Things Happen". Sims current project features an app called Taste of Blue that offers a more accessible route to unique and luxury outcomes. Sims has been featured in over 30 TV shows, over 60 major publications, and has spoken at many events including Harvard.

== Bluefish ==
Sims founded Bluefish in 1996. In 2003, Bluefish partnered with MBNA to launch its own credit card. In 2004, Bluefish was named the official concierge of L.A. and New York Fashion Weeks. In August 2006, Icon International Holdings Inc. signed an agreement with Bluefish Concierge to provide all concierge services for the airline and its travelers. Bluefish Concierge was the official concierge of the Kentucky Derby from 2005 to 2007.

== Education and Personal Details ==
Steve Sims did not attend college, and dropped out of school at the age of 15. Sims currently lives in Los Angeles with his wife, Clare, their 3 children, and their dog.

Steve passed away on July 7, 2025, in Los Angeles, California.
