= Bill Clarken =

American football player and coach (1903–1951)

Profile
- Positions: Tackle, guard

Personal information
- Born: December 31, 1903; East Orange, New Jersey, U.S.
- Died: October 2, 1951 (aged 47); East Orange, New Jersey, U.S.
- Listed height: 5 ft 10 in (1.78 m)
- Listed weight: 210 lb (95 kg)

Career information
- High school: St. Benedict's Prep (NJ)

Career history
- Orange Tornadoes (1929); Passaic Red Devils (1932); Passaic Red Devils (1936)

Career statistics
- Games: 5

William Francis Clarken Jr. (December 31, 1903 – October 2, 1951) was an American football player and coach. He played in the National Football League for the Orange Tornadoes, despite never playing collegiate football.

Clarken was born in 1903 in East Orange, New Jersey, and attended Saint Benedict's Preparatory School in Newark, New Jersey.

He did not play college football. At age 25, he played professional football in the National Football League (NFL) as a tackle and guard for the Orange Tornadoes. He appeared in five NFL games, one as a starter, during the 1929 season.

From 1942 to 1949, he was the line coach at Bloomfield High School in Bloomfield, New Jersey, where he was a resident. He was also the head coach of the 1947 Bloomfield Cardinals of the American Football League. He also coached the Passaic Red Devils. He died in 1951 at age 47.
