= St. Benedict's Preparatory School =

Private K-12 school in Newark, New Jersey, US

- Collegium Sancti Benedicti
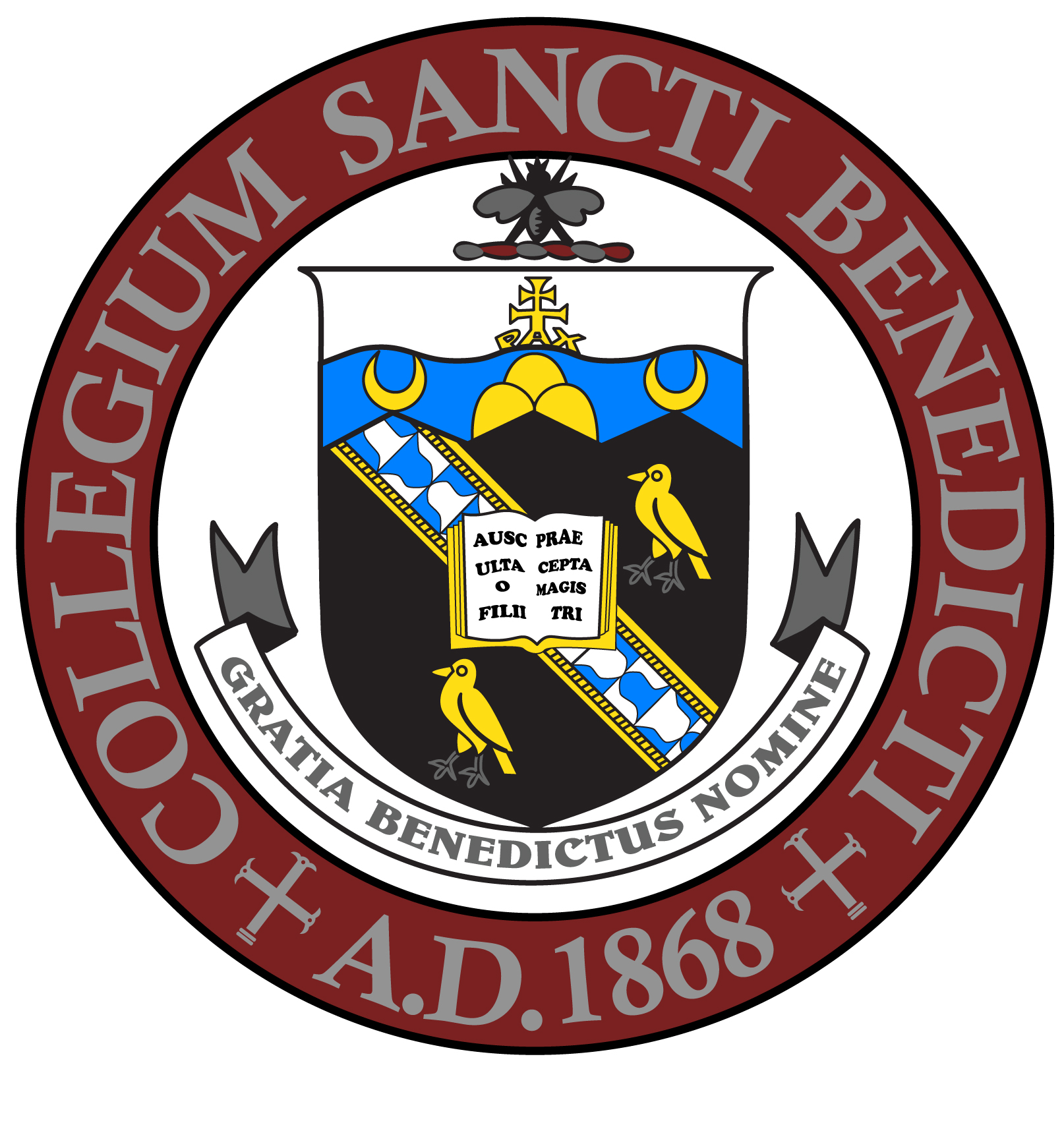
- School crest

Location
- 520 Martin Luther King Jr. Boulevard; Newark, Essex County, New Jersey 07102; United States; 40°44′8″N 74°10′47″W

Information
- Type: Private, parochial day school and boarding school
- Motto: Gratia Benedictus Nomine (Latin) (Blessed In Name And Grace)
- Religious affiliations: Catholic Church (Benedictines)
- Established: 1868
- Founder: Boniface Wimmer, O.S.B.
- NCES School ID: 00863704
- President: Abbot Augustine Curley, O.S.B.
- Headmaster: Rev. Edwin Leahy, O.S.B
- Faculty: 74.9 FTEs
- Grades: K–12
- Gender: Co-educational (grades K-8); Gender segregated (grades 9-12)
- Student to teacher ratio: 12.9:1
- Campus: Urban
- Campus size: 12 acres (49,000 m^{2})
- Colors: Garnet and Gray
- Slogan: Whatever hurts my brother, hurts me and whatever helps my brother, helps me.
- Song: Alma Mater
- Fight song: Boola Boola; Garnet and Gray
- Athletics: 12 varsity teams
- Nickname: Gray Bees
- Accreditation: Middle States Association of Colleges and Schools
- Publication: Kayrix (literary magazine)
- Newspaper: The Benedict News
- Yearbook: Telolog
- Tuition: for 2025–26: $16,550 (grades 9–12) $11,900 (grades 7–8) $6,300 (grades K–6)
- Affiliation: NJAIS
- Assistant Headmaster: Mike Scanlan
- Dean of Faculty: Michelle Tuorto
- Admissions Director: Mario Gallo
- Athletic Director: Frank DiPiano
- Website: www.sbp.org

St. Benedict's Preparatory School is a Catholic college preparatory school in Newark, New Jersey run by the Benedictine monks of Newark Abbey. The school serves boys and girls in kindergarten through twelfth grade on a 12-acre (4.9 ha) urban campus.

== History ==
Established in 1868 by the Benedictine monks of Newark Abbey, the school is guided by the sixth century Rule of Saint Benedict. It has been located in the Archdiocese of Newark for more than 130 years.

The school serves students from Newark and its neighboring communities; students come from 100 towns and approximately 215 schools. More than 60 are from 23 other countries.

Starting in the 2017–18 school year, the former St. Mary School began operating within St. Benedict's. Classes for kindergarten through eighth grade are co-educational. The high school, known as the Prep Division, was previously all-boys before becoming co-institutional (i.e. boys and girls are admitted, but are segregated in classes) in the 2020-2021 school year, after Benedictine Academy in Elizabeth closed in the spring of 2020.

The school was closed for the 1972–73 school year. Since its re-opening in 1973, the headmaster has been Fr Edwin D. Leahy, OSB, who graduated from St. Benedict's in 1963. The school has been accredited by the Middle States Association of Colleges and Schools Commission on Elementary and Secondary Schools since 1990.

As of the 2023–24 school year, the school had an enrollment of 965 students and 74.9 classroom teachers (on an FTE basis), for a student–teacher ratio of 12.9:1. The school's student body was 53.6% (517) Black, 35.4% (342) Hispanic, 4.7% (45) White, 3.8% (37) two or more races, 2.2% (21) Asian and 0.3% (3) American Indian / Alaska Native.

== Curriculum ==
St. Benedict’s Preparatory School operates on an academic calendar distinct from most secondary schools. The year is divided into three instructional phases: Summer, Fall–Winter, and Spring.

The Summer Phase consists of a five-week session held in August, during which students attend half-day classes.

Spring phase ends the academic year. Students choose projects to work on for four weeks such as community service, U.S. history, gardening, dancing, music production, photography, journalism, finance, acting, physics, intense exercising, karate, and cooking.

At the conclusion of the freshman year, students participate in the Backpacking Project, a five-day trek of approximately 50 miles (80 km) along the Appalachian Trail in western New Jersey. Freshmen are organized into teams and assume leadership and support roles. The program is preceded by several weeks of preparation and is intended to foster self-reliance, teamwork, and leadership. Transfer students are also required to participate.

== Extracurricular activities ==
St. Benedict's has a music program and a visual arts program.

The Benedict News student newspaper has won the Columbia Scholastic Press Association gold medal three times, in 2005, 2006, and again in 2008. The school literary magazine, The Kayrix, is published every year during spring phase.

The 520 is a student-run maintenance corporation. The goal of the corporation is to cost-effectively support the maintenance needs of the school while enhancing the environment and providing students with the opportunity to develop skills and earn a competitive income. The corporation was established in 1998.

=== Athletics ===
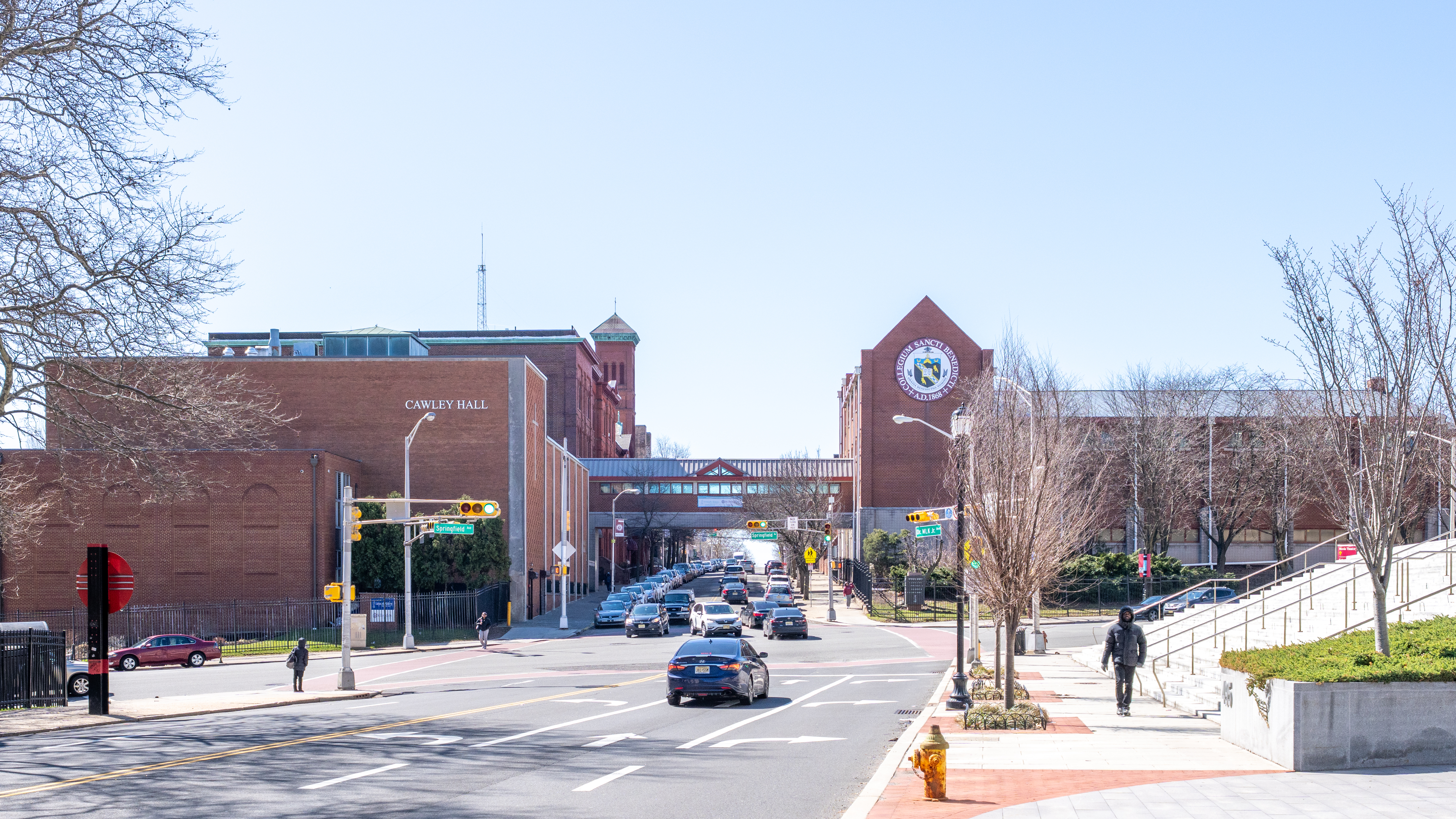
As seen from Martin Luther King Jr Blvd

The St. Benedict's Preparatory School Gray Bees, compete in 12 interscholastic sports: water polo, cross country running, soccer, swimming, fencing, wrestling, basketball, indoor track, crew, golf, baseball, and outdoor track. The school has produced several notable athletes including an Olympic gold medalist. School colors are garnet and gray.

The cross country running team won the all-group state championship in 1921 and the Prep title in nine times from 1922 to 1931. The program's nine state group titles are tied for seventh-most in the state.

The track team won the winter/indoor track Non-Public state championship in six times from 1922 to 1927 and seven times from 1931 to 1937. The 13 state group titles won by the program are ranked fourth in the state.

The track team won the Non-Public Group A spring / outdoor track state championship in 1949.

The wrestling team won the Non-Public Group B North state sectional championship in 1980 (as co-champion), 1984, 1985, 1987, and 1989 to 1991. The team won the Non-public Group B state title in 1987 and 1989 to 1991.

The fencing team won the overall state championship in 1990.

Basketball

St. Benedict's basketball teamconsistently ranks as one of the top high-school basketball teams in the United States among USA Today High School Boys' Basketball Super 25. and is part of what The New York Times calls the "NBA pipeline". In 2013, the basketball team was ranked fifth in ESPN's top 25, losing to Montverde Academy in the ESPN Rise National Championship.

Soccer

The soccer team won the Non-Public Group B state championship in 1982 (against runner-up Mater Dei High School in the finals of the tournament), 1987 (vs. Mater Dei), 1989 (vs. Eustace Preparatory School) and 1990 (vs. St. Augustine Preparatory School). The 1982 team finished the season with an 18-3-1 record after coming back from a 2–0 deficit to win the Parochial B state title with a 3–2 win against Mater Dei in the championship game at Mercer County Park. The 2006 boys' soccer team finished the season with a 20–0 record, and was ranked first in the nation in the NSCAA/adidas National Rankings. A 4–1 win against the Pennington School in the 2011 Prep A championship gave St. Benedict's a perfect 24–0 season, its 23rd consecutive Prep A title and its number one spot as the top-ranked high school soccer team in the nation by ESPN/Rise. St. Benedict's have been recognized as national champion in 1990, 1997, 1998, 2001, 2005, 2006, 2011, 2012, 2014, 2015, 2017, 2018, 2019, 2022, 2024, and 2025. Winning in total of 16 National Championships and 37 State titles. They are widely considered the most dominant high school soccer program in the country. Numerous alumni of the soccer program have become world-renowned players.

== Awards and recognition ==
=== Publicity ===
The history of the school is related in Thomas A. McCabe's Miracle on High Street (New York: Fordham University Press, 2010). On March 20, 2016, the school was featured in a segment of 60 Minutes called "The Resurrection of St. Benedict's".

In June 2021, an article in The New York Times documented students participating in a half-century-old school tradition in which freshmen are required to complete a 50-mile (80 km) hike along the Delaware Water Gap section of the Appalachian Trail.

=== Documentary ===
A documentary about Newark Abbey and Saint Benedict's Prep, The Rule (2014), by filmmakers Marylou and Jerome Bongiorno, was released theatrically, broadcast nationally on PBS, and was screened by the White House Initiative on Educational Excellence for African Americans at the U.S. Department of Education. The film premiered at the 2014 Montclair Film Festival.

== Notable alumni ==
- Precious Achiuwa (born 1999; transferred), professional basketball player for the Toronto Raptors of the National Basketball Association
- Hugh Joseph Addonizio (1914-1981), politician who served for 13 years as a U.S. Congressman before serving as Mayor of Newark from 1962 to 1970
- Juan Agudelo (born 1992), former professional soccer player in Major League Soccer
- Johnny Allen (born c. 1935 or 1936), former college and high school athletics coach
- Gregg Berhalter (born 1973), professional soccer player and coach, member of 2002 and 2006 FIFA World Cup teams, coach of the United States men's national soccer team
- Gilvydas Biruta (born 1991), Lithuanian former basketball player for JL Bourg-en-Bresse of the Pro A
- Isaiah Briscoe (born 1996; transferred), basketball player for the Kentucky Wildcats men's basketball team who transferred out after his sophomore year
- G. Michael Brown (1942–2025), gaming regulator in New Jersey who became a lawyer for the gaming industry, and was the chief executive officer of Foxwoods Resort Casino
- A. J. Calloway (born 1974), television personality
- Jonathan Capehart (born 1967), journalist and television personality who writes the PostPartisan blog for The Washington Post
- Peter A. Carlesimo (1915–2003), basketball coach
- Ownie Carroll (1902–1975), Major League Baseball pitcher who played from 1925 to 1934
- Edward Cheserek (born 1994; class of 2013), runner for the University of Oregon who won the 2013 NCAA cross country championship and track and field championship
- Moussa Cissé (born 2002; transferred), college basketball player for the Oklahoma State Cowboys
- Bill Clarken (1903–1951), football player and coach, who played in the National Football League for the Orange Tornadoes, despite never playing collegiate football
- George Thomas Coker (born 1943), United States Navy aviator who was a prisoner of war during the Vietnam War
- Robert Constant (born 2007; class of 2025), sprinter for the Hampton Pirates men's track and field team. Won the sprint medley relay at the 2025 Adidas Outdoor Nationals as a member of the Newark-based RDE Bulldogs track club.
- David Cubillán (born 1987), basketball player for the Marquette Golden Eagles
- John J. Degnan (born 1944), Attorney General of New Jersey, 1978–1981, vice chairman and chief operating officer of The Chubb Corporation
- Jim Delany (born 1948), former commissioner of the Big Ten Conference
- Joe Dooley (born 1965; class of 1984), former head basketball coach at East Carolina Pirates men's basketball team
- Trevon Duval (born 1998; transferred), basketball player for the Duke Blue Devils men's basketball team
- Gregory Echenique (born 1990), professional basketball player for the Shimane Susanoo Magic of the B.League
- Bobby Edwards (born 1995), soccer goalkeeper
- Tyler Ennis (born 1994; class of 2013), Israeli Basketball Premier League player; formerly player for the Los Angeles Lakers
- Aaron Estrada (born 2001; class of 2019), college basketball player; 2022 Colonial Athletic Association Player of the Year
- Bill Feaster (1904–1950), professional football player; spent two seasons in the National Football League with the Orange/Newark Tornadoes
- Gabriel Ferrari (born 1988), professional soccer striker
- John Joseph Gibbons (1924–2018), federal judge on the United States Court of Appeals for the Third Circuit, president of the New Jersey State Bar Association and partner at the Gibbons P.C. law firm
- Ransford Gyan (born 2006), forward for the Clemson Tigers men's soccer team
- George Ludlum Hartford (1864–1957), longtime chairman and Treasurer of the Great Atlantic and Pacific Tea Company who started working in the supermarket chain while still a student
- Jayden Hibbert (born 2004), professional footballer who plays as a goalkeeper for Major League Soccer club Atlanta United
- John Holland (born 1988), basketball player for Hapoel Tel Aviv of the Israeli Basketball Premier League
- Cullen Jones (born 1984), gold medalist at the 2008 Summer Olympics in Beijing in the Men's 4 × 100 m Freestyle Relay
- Belmar Joseph (born 2005), footballer, plays as a midfielder for FC Sion
- G. Gordon Liddy (1930–2021), central figure in the Watergate scandal, mastermind of the break into Democratic National Committee headquarters in the Watergate building in 1972
- Scott Machado (born 1990), basketball player who plays for Hapoel Eilat of the Israeli Basketball Premier League
- Philip McHarris (born 1992), civil rights activist, political writer and academic at Yale University
- Andris Misters (born 1992), Latvian professional basketball player for VEF Rīga of the Latvian Basketball League
- Mpho Moloi (born 1983), drafted by the Houston Dynamo of Major League Soccer in 2006 and won the MLS Championship with them
- Xavier Munford (born 1992; class of 2010), basketball player for Hapoel Tel Aviv of the Israeli Basketball Premier League
- Ghassan Nehme (born 1995), former professional basketball player
- Kevin O'Connor (born 1968; class of 1986), host of This Old House
- Robert Peace (1980-2011), subject of the biography The Short and Tragic Life of Robert Peace
- Nate Pierre-Louis (born 1998; transferred), professional basketball player for the Oberwart Gunners of the Austrian Basketball Superliga
- Lester Quiñones (born 2000; class of 2018), professional basketball player for the Orlando Magic of the National Basketball Association
- Tab Ramos (born 1966), former professional soccer midfielder who has been inducted into the National Soccer Hall of Fame
- Trevor Reckling (born 1989; class of 2007), former professional baseball player
- Claudio Reyna (born 1973), soccer midfielder who played for Manchester City in England, Rangers F.C. in Scotland and Major League Soccer's New York Red Bulls
- Jamar Ricketts (born 2001; class of 2020), professional soccer player who plays for Major League Soccer club San Jose Earthquakes
- Frank E. Rodgers (1909–2000), politician who served for 48 years as Mayor of Harrison, New Jersey, ranking him among the longest-serving Mayors in U.S. history
- Zack Rosen (born 1989), All-American basketball player at Penn who played for Maccabi Ashdod in Israel
- Noah Sadaoui (born 1993; class of 2011), Moroccan-American professional soccer player who currently plays as a winger with Al-Khaburah Club
- Samardo Samuels (born 1989; class of 2008), power forward/center who played for the Cleveland Cavaliers and currently plays for Olimpia Milano
- Chris Smith (born 1987), basketball player for Hapoel Galil Elyon of the Israeli Liga Leumit
- J. R. Smith (born 1985; class of 2004), former professional basketball player and two-time NBA champion
- John M. Smith (1935–2019), prelate of the Roman Catholic Church, who served as the ninth Bishop of Trenton, from 1997 to 2010
- Corey Stokes (born 1988; class of 2007), Villanova shooting guard who was selected to compete in the McDonald's All-American Game
- Walt Szot (1920–1981), football tackle who played five seasons in the NFL with the Chicago Cardinals and Pittsburgh Steelers
- Lance Thomas (born 1988; class of 2006), former Duke basketball player and member of the 2010 NCAA Championship team who played in the NBA for the New York Knicks, Brooklyn Nets, New Orleans Pelicans, and Oklahoma City Thunder
- Arnaldo Toro (born 1997), professional basketball player who last played for Juventus Utena of the Lithuanian Basketball League
- Petter Villegas (born 1975), soccer winger, who played in Major League Soccer and for the Puerto Rico national football team
- Dick Weisgerber (1915-1984), defensive back, fullback and kicker who played four NFL seasons with the Green Bay Packers
- John J. Wilson (1926-2015), politician who served in the New Jersey General Assembly from 1958 to 1964
- Michael Young (born 1994; class of 2013), basketball player for Ironi Nahariya of the Israeli Basketball Premier League

== Notable staff ==
- Ernest Blood (1872–1955), basketball coach who led St. Benedict's Prep to a 421–128 record and five state championships from 1925 to 1950
- Dan Hurley (2001–2010), basketball coach and former player and member of famed Hurley family, who led the Gray Bees to a 223-21 overall record while head coach and became the fastest coach in New Jersey basketball history to reach the 200-win mark
