= Vailsburg High School =

Defunct high school in Newark, New Jersey, United States

Location
- 107 Ivy Street; Newark, New Jersey; United States
- 40.7377°N 74.2380°W

Information
- Type: Public high school
- Established: 1961
- Closed: 1988
- School district: Newark Public Schools

Vailsburg High School was a public high school in Vailsburg, Newark, United States. It was established in 1961 and was part of the Newark Public Schools district. It closed as a high school in 1988; the district has since re-purposed the building as a middle school and elementary school.

The school's student body was 56 percent black in 1975 and 84 percent black by 1979, during the continued white flight in the city through the 1970s.

== Athletics ==
The boys' soccer team won the Group III state championship in 1964 (defeating River Dell High School in the tournament final) and was Group II co-champion in 1981 (with Moorestown High School). The 1964 team had a 12-2-2 record after winning the Group III title following a 2-1 win against River Dell in the championship game.

The boys' basketball team won the Group II state championship in 1972, defeating Ocean City High School in the tournament final.

The boys track team won the Group II spring / outdoor track state championship in 1974.

The girls team won the NJSIAA spring track Group II title in 1978, and won the Group III title in 1981 and 1984.

The girls track team won the indoor relay championship in Group II in 1982 and the Group II title in 1983-1987. The program's six group titles are tied for fifth-most in the state and the string of five consecutive titles from 1983 to 1987 are the second-longest such streak.

== Notable alumni ==
- Dan Gutman, writer
- Wyclef Jean, rapper, musician and actor
- Stephen A. Mikulak, politician
