= 1967 Newark riots =

Armed conflicts in Newark, New Jersey, United States

- Part of the Long Hot Summer of 1967
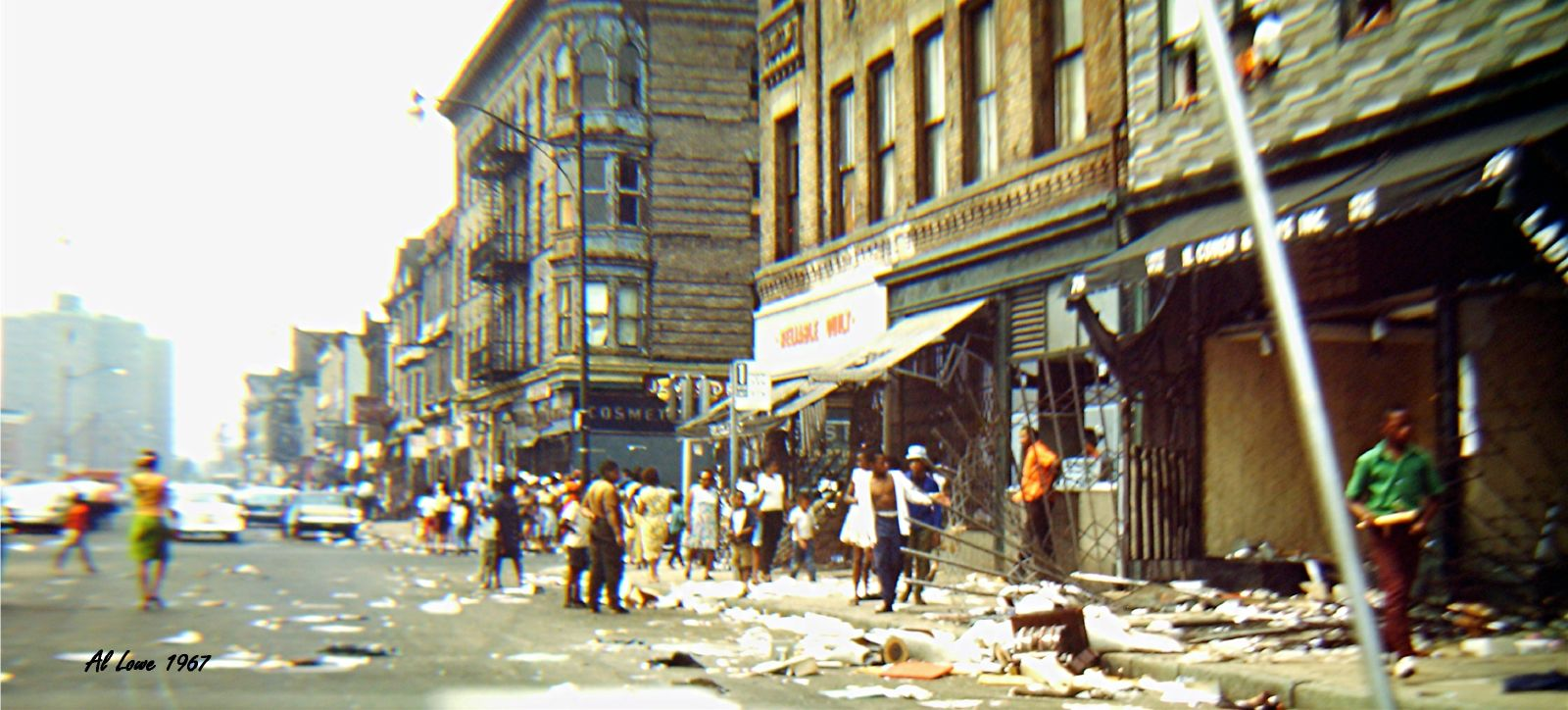
- The streets of Newark on July 14
- Date: July 12–17, 1967
- Location: Newark, New Jersey; 40.732°N 74.191°W
- Caused by: Beating of a black man by police
- Methods: Rioting, arson, shooting, assault, rock throwing
- Result: See Aftermath and impact

Parties
| Rioters, residents of Newark, NJ | State of New Jersey; (New Jersey) City of Newark; Newark Police Department; New Jersey National Guard; New Jersey State Police |

Casualties
- Deaths: 26
- Injuries: 727
- Arrested: 1,465

The 1967 Newark riots involved violent, armed conflict in the streets of Newark. Taking place over a four-day period (between July 12 and July 17, 1967), the Newark riots resulted in at least 26 deaths and hundreds more serious injuries. Serious property damage, including shattered storefronts and fires caused by arson, left many of the city's buildings damaged or destroyed. At the height of the conflict, the National Guard was called upon to occupy the city with tanks and other military equipment, leading to iconic media depictions that were considered particularly shocking when shared in the national press. In the aftermath of the riots, Newark was quite rapidly abandoned by many of its remaining middle-class and affluent residents, as well as much of its white working-class population. The large amount of violence led to accelerated flight, followed by a decades-long period of disinvestment and urban blight, including soaring crime rates and gang activity. But recently Newark has made a comeback with the lowest homicide rates since 1953 and now leads the nation in declining violent crime rates. Newark has also seen significant investment in recent years and tons of new construction.

The Newark riots represented a flashpoint in a long-simmering conflict between elements of the city's then-growing African-American population, which had at the time recently become a numerical majority, and its old political establishment, which remained dominated by members of non-African ethnic groups (especially Italian, Jewish, and Irish Americans) who had gained a political foothold in Newark during earlier generations. Endemic corruption in local government, combined with widespread racial prejudice, likely contributed to the city's failure, during the leadup to 1967, to include a more representative cross-section of the city's Black population in its political power structure. The Newark riots were part of a larger national phenomenon, being among more than 150 race riots that occurred in the United States in the "Long Hot Summer of 1967". Some historians, focusing on the protest element of the conflict, have termed it the 1967 Newark Rebellion.

== Background ==
Deindustrialization and suburbanization were major contributors to changes in Newark's demographics. White middle-class residents left for other towns across North Jersey, in one of the largest examples of white flight in the country. Between 1960 to 67', the city switched from 65% White to 52% Black and 10% Cuban and Puerto Rican. Due to the legislation of the Servicemen's Readjustment Act of 1944, increasing numbers of white veterans, who had recently returned from fighting in World War II, emigrated from Newark to the suburbs where there was improved access to interstate highways, low-interest mortgages, and colleges. The outflow suburban sprawl of white veterans from Newark was rapidly replaced with an influx of Black people moving into the Central Ward; blacks, however, faced discrimination in jobs and housing, ultimately making their lives more likely to fall into a cycle of poverty. By 1967, Newark was one of the United States' first majority-Black cities, but was still controlled by white politicians.

Racial profiling, redlining, and lack of opportunity in education, training, and jobs led the city's African–American residents to feel powerless and disenfranchised. In particular, many felt they had been largely excluded from meaningful political representation and often subjected to police brutality.

Newark established a Community Relations Bureau in their police department as early as March 1966. Newark's Police Department director, Dominick Spina, rejected the budget request as he thought it would not be approved. This was much to the disliking to the residents of the Central Ward and it led to more tensions growing in the area as residents saw that in cases of police brutality on Black residents, the police would not be held accountable.

Unemployment and poverty were very high, with the traditional manufacturing base of the city having been fully eroded and withdrawn by 1967. Further fueling tensions was the decision by the state of New Jersey to clear tenement buildings from a vast tract of land in the Central Ward to build the new University of Medicine and Dentistry. Thousands of low-income African American residents were displaced at a time when housing in Newark was aging and subjected to high tax rates. Later reports also pointed to Hassan Jeru-Ahmed as a possible agitator in the days leading up to the riots.

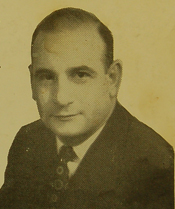
Hugh Addonizio

Many African Americans, especially younger community leaders, felt they had remained largely disenfranchised in Newark, despite massive changes in the city's demographic makeup. Mayor Hugh J. Addonizio – to date the last white mayor of the city – took few steps to adjust to the changes and provide African Americans with civil leadership positions and better employment opportunities.

Despite being one of the first cities in the country to hire Black police officers, the department's demographics remained at odds with the city's population at the time which unlike today which it is plurality Black it was majority Black at the time and today it is 44.8% Black. But at the time was majority Black thus leading to poor relations between Black residents and the police department. Only 145 of the 1,322 police officers in the city were Black (11%), mirroring national demographics, while the city grew to be over 50% black. Black leaders were increasingly upset that the Newark Police Department remained dominated by white officers, who would routinely stop and question Black youths with or without provocation. The riots in Newark occurred two years after riots in Los Angeles and came at a time when racial tensions were high. Historians believe that the shrinking of the economy, increased unemployment, and a city with a majority African American population which was being run by white politicians increased tensions during that era.

== Inciting incident ==
On the evening of July 12, at 9:40 pm two white Newark police officers, John DeSimone and Vito Pontrelli, pulled over a black cab driver, John William Smith. The officers had stopped Smith after he pulled around their double-parked police car. Police said that Smith's driving license had been revoked, and that he had been involved in eight car crashes in the days prior but continued to operate his vehicle.

The officers beat and arrested Smith and later took him to the 4th Police Precinct and charged him with assaulting the officers and making insulting remarks.

Smith was originally from the South, where he was a trumpet player but had moved to Newark to help pay his expenses. Smith got a job at a local taxi company, renting a one-room apartment in the Ironbound District along with a yellow taxi cab for $16.50 per day.

Residents of the Hayes Homes, a large public housing project, saw an incapacitated Smith being dragged into the precinct. Rumors that he had been beaten to death while in police custody began to spread, and a large crowd soon formed outside the precinct.

Accounts of the next moments vary. Some say that the crowd threw rocks through the precinct windows and police then rushed outside wearing riot helmets and carrying clubs.

Others say that police rushed out of their station first to confront the crowd, and were met with bricks, bottles, and rocks.

One witness to the initial arrest contacted members of the Congress of Racial Equality, the United Freedom Party, and the Newark Community Union Project for further investigation; they were subsequently granted access to Smith's 4th Precinct holding cell.

After seeing the injuries Smith sustained from the police, they demanded he be moved to Beth Israel Hospital in Newark, New Jersey, and were granted their request.

At least five police officers were struck by stones, according to one officer. Some residents went to City Hall and continued to protest.

After midnight, false alarms caused fire engines to race around a six-block area along Belmont Avenue. Looters smashed windows of a few stores and threw merchandise onto sidewalks. According to police, liquor stores were the main target of looters.

Mayor Addonizio seemed unconcerned about the possibility of further violence occurring. On July 13 he met with Robert Curvin of CORE, an Essex County official named Earl Harris, a teacher named Harry Wheeler, and Duke Moore, a member of the UCC's board. They made three demands of the mayor:

- suspend the two officers who arrested Smith;
- conduct an investigation into what happened on the night of July 12;
- promote Lieutenant Eddie Williams, the highest ranking black member on the police force, to captain.

Addonizio said that he needed 48 hours to consider these demands. When he left the meeting, he went to the Central Ward where he realized he would need to take action much sooner. As the meeting was ending, members of the Students for a Democratic Society's Newark branch distributed handwritten leaflets in the area promoting a rally at the 4th Precinct at 7:30 pm.

== Riots ==
=== July 13 ===
New Jersey Governor Hughes and Addonizio assigned James Threatt, the Newark Human Rights Commission's (NHRC) executive director, as an observer and Spina assigned 500 officers to stop any violence. The march/rally that was scheduled to have happened would occur. By 6:30 pm a group of 10 picketers had formed a line outside of the 4th precinct. By 7:30 pm Black residents who were angry and carrying homemade signs marched in front of Hayes Homes, a public housing development located directly across the street from the 4th precinct. No police officer would be stationed outside of the precinct building when this protest initially occurred. Threatt would announce to the crowd in an attempt he thought would calm them down that an African American man on the police force, Lieutenant Eddie Williams would be promoted to captain. However he didn't mention that Addonizio was also planning to promote four white lieutenants as well. Violence began a few minutes after his announcement.

During the rally, an unknown woman smashed the windows of the 4th Precinct with a metal bar. Looting spread quickly along Springfield Avenue, the neighborhood's business district. Molotov cocktails were thrown into shops and entire buildings soon caught fire. A car was burned and shortly after a policeman was injured by an unknown assailant with a brick. In response, shotguns were issued to some police officers.

=== July 14 ===
By midnight, looting spread to other areas in proximity to the march and all police were placed on emergency duty. At 1:00 a.m. police were told to "fire if necessary." Addonizio called Governor Hughes asking for the New Jersey State Police at 2:20 a.m. His request was accepted at 2:29 a.m. with 300 state troopers being sent and activated exactly 9 minutes later. At 2:30 a.m. he called the Governor again saying that his city needed the New Jersey Army National Guard, who were activated 9 minutes later with a total of 3,464 being brought into the city. By morning, three people had been killed. Rose Abraham, a 45 year old mother was shot while out looking for one of her children. Tedlock Bell Jr. was shot while surrendering to the police. James Saunders was shot while running from a liquor store. Police killed up to five men while shooting at the ground floor of a building, later saying they were "hunting for a sniper" on the upper floors. Three of the men killed had their belongings taken off their bodies.

"Oscar Hill was wearing his American Legion jacket. Murray's body was missing $126 and a ring. Robert Lee Martin's family reported that cops stripped money from his body."

According to a petition signed by 76 residents of Beacon Street, members of the New Jersey State Police approached the street corner around 5:30 and sprayed bullets from left to right, hitting two people. At 8:30, the National Guard killed ten year old Eddie Moss while shooting at his father's car at a checkpoint. The family was driving to White Castle.

Detective Frederick Toto was shot while patrolling in the streets of Newark at 7:30 pm on July 14. He was patrolling the streets with Patrolman Butross when a sniper fired at them from a high-rise, striking Detective Toto. He was sent to St. Michael's Medical Center where surgeons unsuccessfully attempted life-saving surgery. Toto was the first police casualty of the riots. After he was shot at from the high-rise, over 200 National Guard soldiers combined with state and city police opened fire on the building where they believed the sniper to be positioned, arresting 25 people in response. Rufus Council was shot and killed a short time after Toto when he was leaving a steakhouse where he had eaten dinner. Isaac Harrison and Robert Lee Martin were both also killed in the vicinity of Toto's shooting. Toto's death attracted national attention to the riots in the city.

=== July 15–17 ===
Early on the evening of July 15, a woman named Rebecca Brown was killed in a fusillade of bullets directed at the window of her second-floor apartment, leading to further backlash and discord from the community. By the sixth day, riots, looting, violence, and destruction had left a total of 16 civilians, 8 suspects, a police officer, and a firefighter dead; 567 civilians, 67 police officers, 55 firefighters, and 38 military personnel injured; and 689 civilians and 811 suspects arrested and property damage is expected to have exceeded $10 million.

=== Media coverage ===
Photographer Bud Lee was in Newark along with Life reporter Dale Wittner during the riots. There, Lee took several grim photos of a police officer shooting 24-year-old William Furr, who was caught in an act of stealing a six pack of beer from the ransacked Mack's Liquors store; both Lee and Wittner had earlier met Furr who barged into the latter's conversation with a Black Muslim man regarding the rioting situation. He also shot a photo of a 12-year-old civilian, Joe Bass Jr. who was bleeding on the ground after stray pellets from the shotgun blast that killed Furr accidentally struck him. Bass survived the wounds and his image became the cover of Life magazine on July 28, 1967.

=== Response ===
The riots elicited a strong response from law enforcement organizations. 7,917 members of police and National Guard were deployed, leading to 1,465 arrests and 26 deaths. In an effort to contain the riots, every evening at 6:00 pm the Bridge Street and Jackson Street Bridges, both of which span the Passaic River between Newark and Harrison, were closed until the next morning.

Further complicating matters was that the National Guard, State Police, and local police forces had difficulty coordinating their actions due to the three organizations communicating on three different assigned radio frequency ranges.

== Aftermath and impact ==
Following the civil unrest, New Jersey Governor Richard J. Hughes established a state commission in August 1967 to investigate the root causes of the Newark riots. The resulting 1968 Report for Action, also known as the Lilley Report (named after its chairman, AT&T executive Robert D. Lilley), cited systemic institutional failures, police misconduct, socioeconomic inequality, and political exclusion as the primary causes of the violence. The commission issued nearly 100 recommendations, heavily focusing on reforming law enforcement, improving hiring practices for minorities, and establishing better communication between the police and the city's disadvantaged communities. The Lilley Report served as a direct blueprint and structural validation for the federal Kerner Commission.

While the riots are often cited as a major factor in the decline of Newark and its neighboring communities at the time, longer-term racial, economic, and political forces contributed towards generating disinvestment at the time. By the 1960s and 1970s, as industry fled the city, so did the white middle class, leaving behind a Black population in the Southern Ward, Eastern Ward and Central Ward at the time, while the Northern Ward and Ironbound remained white and Hispanic at the time. During this same time, the population of many suburban communities in northern New Jersey expanded rapidly due to white flight at the time.

The riots caused about $10 million in damages ($97 million today) and destroyed multiple plots, several of which are still vacant as of 2025 but are starting to recover as Newarks revitalization and growing population are changing it.

The ratio of Newark officers respective to their ethnicity has increased as of 2000, when Newark was 52% Black, 34% Latino, and 14% white, the Newark Police Department was 37% Black, 27% Hispanic and 36% white. As of 2016, the force was 35% Black, 24% white, while the Latino portion had increased to 41%.

== In popular culture ==
The riots were depicted in the 1997 Philip Roth novel American Pastoral as well as its 2016 film adaptation, directed by and starring Ewan McGregor, alongside Jennifer Connelly and Dakota Fanning.

The events are the setting of one section of the 2017 novel 4 3 2 1 by Paul Auster.

Revolution '67 is a feature-length documentary about the riots by Emmy-nominated, Newark-based filmmakers Marylou and Jerome Bongiorno. It premiered on PBS in 2007 as part of its series POV and examines the causes and outcome of the Newark 1967 riots.

The Sopranos episode "Down Neck" features a flashback in which Tony Soprano's mother, Livia Soprano, is watching the riots live on television.

In September 2021, a theatrical prequel to The Sopranos premiered, entitled The Many Saints of Newark, which is partially set during the riots.

== See also ==
- Revolution '67
- New Community Corporation
- History of Newark, New Jersey
- List of incidents of civil unrest in the United States
- 1967 Plainfield riots
