= Peter A. Carlesimo =

American football player, athletics coach, and college athletics administrator

Biographical details
- Born: September 2, 1915; Newark, New Jersey, U.S.
- Died: June 22, 2003 (aged 87); Montclair, New Jersey, U.S.

Playing career
- 1938–1939: Fordham
- Position: Guard

Coaching career (HC unless noted)

Football
- 1940–1941: Saint Benedict's Prep (NJ)
- 1942: Scranton (assistant)
- 1944–1960: Scranton

Basketball
- 1944–1946: Scranton
- 1951–1955: Scranton

Cross Country
- 1961–1968: Scranton

Administrative career (AD unless noted)
- 1953–1968: Scranton
- 1968–1978: Fordham
- 1978–1988: NIT (executive director)

Head coaching record
- Overall: 80–60–4 (college football); 61–77 (basketball)

Peter A. Carlesimo (September 2, 1915 – June 22, 2003) was an American football player, coach of football, basketball, and cross country running, and a college athletics administrator. He coached football, basketball, and cross country at the University of Scranton and served as athletic director there and at Fordham University. He is sometimes credited with being the person most responsible for keeping the National Invitation Tournament (NIT) alive in the late 1970s.

Born in Newark, New Jersey, Carlesimo graduated from Saint Benedict's Preparatory School, then attended Fordham University in The Bronx, where he played football alongside Vince Lombardi. He graduated from Fordham in 1940, and from there went back to his alma mater, Saint Benedict's, to be a history teacher and assistant football coach. Carlesimo then moved on to the University of Scranton, where he was the football coach (1944–1960), basketball coach (1944–1946 and 1951–1955), cross country coach (1961–1968), and the school's athletic director from (1953–1968).

Carlesimo went on to become the athletic director at Fordham University from 1968 to 1978. As a member of the Metropolitan Intercollegiate Basketball Association (MIBA), Fordham was part of the committee that ran the National Invitation Tournament. The tournament began to lose luster in the mid-1970s following the implementation of a rule (the so-called "Al McGuire rule") forbidding schools from declining bids to the National Collegiate Athletic Association tournament. This had led to a dwindling in talent and interest in the NIT, which Carlesimo sought to fix by rules changes implemented in 1977. Carlesimo proposed moving the early round games to campus sites, and having only the final four teams play at Madison Square Garden in New York City. This move is seen as the reason the NIT has survived, as more interest is garnered by the schools participating, as they now have more of a financial stake from ticket sales.

Carlesimo went on to become the first full-time executive director of the NIT from 1978 to 1988, and in 1985, under Carlesimo's leadership, the NIT began a preseason tournament which included many of the country's best teams along with teams which have used the tournament as a springboard to much better seasons. He is still considered to be one of the most influential persons in the long and storied history of the NIT. He is a member of the University of Scranton's Athletic Hall of Fame, the Fordham University Athletic Hall of Fame, the Pennsylvania Sports Hall of Fame, and the NCAA Athletic Director's Hall of Fame. He also won Scranton's Pro Deo award, a Pop Warner Father of the Year award, and was a member of the Jesuit Honor Society.

== Personal ==
Carlesimo was known as a humorous speaker, having appeared at countless sports-related dinners and conferences, and was once a guest on The Tonight Show Starring Johnny Carson. He was married to Lucy Rogan and had ten children, including P. J. Carlesimo, the eldest, who was a longtime coach at Seton Hall University and in the National Basketball Association (NBA). Carlesimo died at age 87 in 2003 at his home in Upper Montclair, New Jersey.
