= MBNA =

American bank and bank holding company

- Formerly: Maryland National Bank
- Type: Bank
- Industry: Financial services
- Predecessor: Baltimore Trust Company
- Founded: 1982; 44 years ago in Wilmington, Delaware, United States
- Founder: Charles Cawley
- Defunct: January 1, 2006; 20 years ago (United States); June 1, 2017; 9 years ago (United Kingdom)
- Fate: Acquisition by Bank of America (U.S.); Acquisition by Lloyds Banking Group (U.K.); Acquisition by Toronto-Dominion Bank (Canada)

MBNA Corporation (Initialism from Maryland Bank National Association) was a bank holding company and parent company of wholly owned subsidiary MBNA America Bank, N.A., headquartered in Wilmington, Delaware, prior to being acquired by Bank of America in 2006.

== History ==
The former Maryland National Bank, once the largest banking chain in Maryland, originated as the Baltimore Trust Company in the early 1900s. It later was challenged by the expenses and problems from the building of its landmark red brick, masonry, and limestone art deco-style skyscraper in downtown Baltimore at 10 Light Street between East Redwood (known as German Street before World War I) and East Baltimore Streets. Construction began on the new BTC Building in 1924. Upon completion in 1929, it became the tallest building in Baltimore (and Maryland), surpassing the neighboring Citizens National Bank to the south. It opened just before the avalanche of economic disaster and unemployment following the Wall Street crash of 1929. After a series of reorganizations during the "New Deal" administration of 32nd President Franklin D. Roosevelt (and his bank holiday shortly after taking office in March 1933), the bank was reorganized as the Maryland National Bank.

Maryland National's parent, bank holding company MNC Financial, began offering credit cards in the 1960s.

In the early 1980s, Maryland banks lobbied the Maryland General Assembly for legislation to permit higher interest rates on credit-card charges, but lawmakers refused. The neighboring state of Delaware, by contrast, had removed interest-rate restrictions in 1981. When Maryland failed to do the same, MNC Financial moved its credit-card business across the state line. MBNA was founded in 1982 as Maryland Bank, N.A.

Led by Charles Cawley, MBNA opened its first office in a converted A&P (Great Atlantic & Pacific Tea Company) food supermarket in Ogletown, Delaware. An early driver of MBNA's growth was the creation of "affinity cards" in 1983. Cawley convinced the alumni association at his alma mater, Georgetown University, to allow MBNA to issue credit cards branded with the university's name. This proved to be a successful business, and other affinity affiliations with universities, organizations, and sports teams followed; by 2004, MBNA had more than 5,400 partnerships, making up about 85% of the affinity-card market.

In 1989, Maryland Bank was renamed MBNA America Bank. In 1991, MBNA Corp. spun off from Maryland National and became an independent company. Businessman Al Lerner, a major investor and chairman of Maryland National since 1989, was the new MBNA's largest stockholder and chairman. Lerner became a multi-billionaire and purchased the Cleveland Browns franchise of the National Football League in 1998. He served as chairman of MBNA until his death in 2002.

Maryland National was acquired by NationsBank in 1993.

As MBNA grew, it became one of the most profitable companies in the United States, the world's largest independent credit card issuer, and the largest private-sector employer in Delaware.

In 1995, MBNA moved its headquarters from a suburban location to Rodney Square in downtown Wilmington, Delaware. This investment was credited with helping to revive Wilmington's downtown real estate market. In 2003, MBNA partnered with Bluefish entrepreneur Steve Sims to launch its own credit card.

Historically, many MBNA executives were former employees of the FBI.

== Mergers and acquisitions ==
On June 30, 2005, MBNA announced that it was being acquired by Bank of America for stock and cash totaling more than $35 billion, and the deal was closed on January 1, 2006. The acquisition resulted in MBNA being renamed to "Bank of America Card Services" while still based in Delaware. For the first part of 2006, MBNA still issued credit cards under its own name associated with Mastercard, VISA, and American Express, but by the second half of 2006, all credit card products were re-branded as Bank of America rather than MBNA.

At the same time in June 2005, MBNA bought Loans.co.uk (LCUK), then the United Kingdom's leading finance broker. Although figures were never released, various media outlets including newspapers in Watford, where Loans.co.uk was based, reported the deal made founders David Cowham and Steve Hayes worth £100m. MBNA/Bank of America later decided to close Loans.co.uk.

On January 1, 2006, MBNA merged with and into Bank of America. MBNA America Bank, National Association, (MBNA) then became a wholly owned subsidiary of Bank of America. On June 10, 2006, MBNA changed its name to FIA Card Services, National Association (FIA), which is not an acronym. On October 20, 2006, Bank of America, National Association (USA), a subsidiary of Bank of America Corporation, merged with and into FIA.

This purchase was a reunion of sorts. In 1993, NationsBank (formerly NCNB, and originally North Carolina National Bank) bought MNC Financial (whose credit card division was spun off years earlier to become MBNA). Five years later, the Bank of America that exists today was the result of the merger between the San Francisco-based Bank of America and the Charlotte-based NationsBank. When Bank of America bought MBNA, it was in effect reuniting MNC Financial's credit card portfolio to its original banking assets and combining the Bank of America credit card portfolio with MBNA's.

Employing more than 25,800 people around the world at the time of the merger with Bank of America, MBNA owned or managed more than $122.5 billion in outstanding consumer credit loans. Most of this loan debt was held in securitized portfolios that had been sold to other entities such as insurance companies and pension funds. MBNA virtually invented the process for securitizing credit card debt and this process contributed significantly to the fast growth of the company. It allowed for increasing the amount loaned without having to acquire matching assets to offset the loans.

In Canada and Europe, the MBNA name was retained. MBNA Europe headquarters was in Chester, England, United Kingdom. MBNA Canada's headquarters is located in Ottawa, Ontario. In 2007, the Canadian division was named one of Canada's Top 100 Employers.

On August 15, 2011, MBNA announced that the Toronto-Dominion Bank would be purchasing MBNA's Canadian MasterCard portfolio. The acquisition of MBNA Canada by TD, which was completed on December 1, 2011, saw TD become a dual credit issuer (both Visa and MasterCard), become Canada's largest MasterCard issuer, and one of Canada's largest credit issuing banks.

In January 2013, Virgin Money agreed to buy £1 billion of assets from MBNA, namely the Virgin Credit Card assets which MBNA had serviced and managed in partnership with Virgin Money since 2002. The former Vice Chairman of MBNA Corporation, Lance Weaver, became Virgin Money's President of Virgin Money Cards.

On December 20, 2016, Lloyds Banking Group announced that it would purchase MBNA's UK portfolio from Bank of America for £1.9 billion, its first acquisition after the 2008 financial crisis. The deal was completed on June 1, 2017 and since that time, in the United Kingdom, MBNA is a trading style of Lloyds Bank plc and is regulated in the United Kingdom by the FCA.

== Controversies ==
MBNA hired Hunter Biden (then 26 years old and a recent law school graduate) during the years when his father, then-Senator Joe Biden, was pushing for bankruptcy reform legislation supported by the company, which became law and makes it more difficult to acquire bankruptcy protection. Because of the close relationship between Biden and MBNA, Byron York called Biden the "Senator from MBNA" in a 1998 article for conservative magazine The American Spectator.

MBNA was one of the companies mentioned on a 2004 Frontline WGBH Boston PBS special about unfair business practices by credit card companies. Some practices that Frontline claimed MBNA has engaged in included doubling or tripling of interest rates, shifting billing due dates/payment cycles monthly and raising rates for customers whose payments were a day or two late. MBNA has been found to be one of the leading implementors of rate-jacking. For further information and links, see credit card.

In Ireland, MBNA was accused of calling consumers up to eight times a day who were behind in making payments, which prompted the state debt advisory service to publicly state that harassment is outlawed. Affected people were advised to complain to the relevant authorities. The company in December 2009 admitted overcharging 500,000 Irish consumers up to €18 million.

In the UK, circa September 2010, MBNA came under fire for its interpretation of new UK legislation, under which credit card providers must allocate payments to the debt with the highest interest rate first: one consumer site called MBNA's interpretation of these rules a "disingenuous money-making tactic".
