= The Short and Tragic Life of Robert Peace =

Biography by Jeff Hobbs

- Author: Jeff Hobbs
- Subject: Robert DeShaun Peace
- Publisher: Scribner
- Publication date: 2014

The Short and Tragic Life of Robert Peace (2014) is a biography by Jeff Hobbs about his friend and college roommate Robert Peace. Peace grew up in the city of Orange, near Newark, New Jersey and attended Yale University. While telling the story of Peace’s life chronologically, the book focuses on Peace’s relationships with family and friends as well as addressing American housing, education, justice, and banking systems that affected Peace’s life.

== Reviews ==
During the book’s first week of release, it ranked #9 on The New York Times Best Seller List. In the paper’s Books of the Times review, Janet Maslin called the book “a haunting work of nonfiction.” and in The New York Times Book Review Anand Giridharadas called the book “mesmeric” and wrote, “[Hobbs] asks the consummate American question: is it possible to reinvent yourself, to sculpture your own destiny?…That one man can contain such contradictions makes for an astonishing, tragic story. In Hobbs’s hands, though, it becomes something more: an interrogation of our national creed of self-invention…” Writing for the Los Angeles Times Hector Tobar commented that “The Short and Tragic Life of Robert Peace is a book that is as much about class as it is race. Peace traveled across America’s widening social divide, and Hobbs’s book is an honest, insightful, and empathetic account of his sometimes painful, always strange journey.” The Boston Globe review stated that “[Hobbs] has a tremendous ability to empathize with all of his characters without romanticizing any of them.” The San Francisco Chronicle asked, “Can a man transcend the circumstances into which he’s born? Can he embody two wildly-divergent souls? To what degree are all of us, more or less, slaves to our environments?…As Hobbs reveals in tremendously moving and painstaking detail, [Peace] may have never had a chance.”

== Awards ==
The Short and Tragic Life of Robert Peace was named a People Magazine “Best Book of Fall,” an O Magazine “Best Book of 2014,” an Entertainment Weekly “10 Best Nonfiction Books of 2014,” a New York Times 100 Notable Books of 2014, a finalist for the 2015 PEN/Jacqueline Bograd Weld Award for Biography, iBooks Best Nonfiction of 2014, and a Goodreads Choice Awards finalist in Biography & History.

- Runner up for the 2015 Dayton Literary Peace Prize for Nonfiction
- Winner Los Angeles Times Book Prize for Current Interest in 2014

== Rob Peace (film) ==
A film adaptation of Peace's story entitled Rob Peace was released in August, 2024. Filmed in Newark, New Jersey, it is written and directed by Chiwetel Ejiofor with a cast including Ejiofor, Mary J. Blige, Camila Cabello, Michael Kelly, and Jay Will in the title role.
